= Circle Tower =

Art Deco NRHP building in Indianapolis, Indiana

- U.S. Historic district – Contributing property
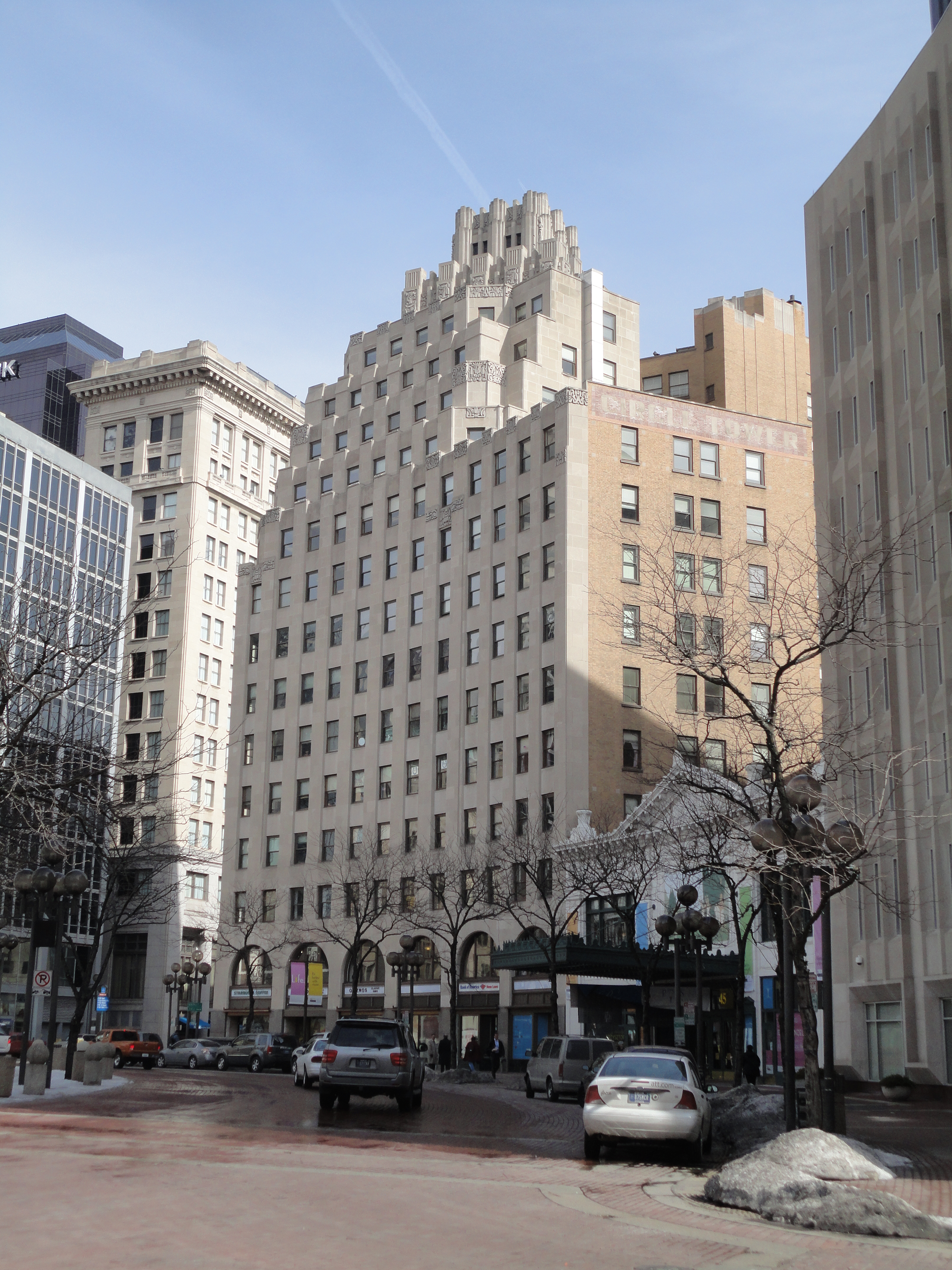
- Circle Tower in 2016

- Location within Indianapolis Location within Indiana Location within the United States
- Location: 55 Monument Circle; Indianapolis, Indiana, U.S.
- Coordinates: 39°46′06″N 86°09′25″W
- Built: 1929–1930
- Architect: Rubush & Hunter
- Architectural style: Art Deco
- Part of: Washington Street–Monument Circle Historic District (ID97001179)

Significant dates
- Groundbreaking: July 2, 1929
- Added to NRHP: September 26, 1997

Circle Tower is a 14-story high rise at 55 Monument Circle in Indianapolis, Indiana, United States. The building is a contributing property of the Washington Street–Monument Circle Historic District, which was listed in the National Register of Historic Places in 1997.

The building was designed by Rubush & Hunter and is an example of Art Deco architecture. The building features ziggurat-like upper floors to circumvent a 108 ft (33 m) height restriction which was set by the city planners. Another design element is the use of Egyptian motifs and artwork.

== Planning ==
The Tower Realty Company was approved to build on the site in 1929. By May 1929 the site was cleared by razing buildings which included the State Savings and Trust and the Franklin buildings. There was also the four-story building of the Starr Piano Company on the site which had to be purchased and razed. The piano store's 99-year lease also had to be purchased by the Tower Realty Company.

The Circle Tower building construction, including the 99-year lease of the piano company, was $1.7 million (equivalent to $31,875,000 in 2025). The Indianapolis Star reported that the lobby and walls would feature imported marble, carved granite, limestone and bronze, and that automatic elevators would be installed. The architects announced that their design would be a nine-story building with five additional stories erected on the set-back principle of construction. By October 3, 1929, most of the structure's exterior had been built.

== History ==
Circle Tower was completed in 1930 and is located on Monument Circle. It is in the style of Art Deco architecture. The building has 111,000 sq ft (10,300 m^{2}) of floorspace and features an Egyptian motif with other design details that include an ornate lobby. In 1997, the building was listed on the National Register of Historic Places as a contribution property of the Washington Street–Monument Circle Historic District.

The Chicago co-working company Expansive purchased the building from Ambrose Property Group for $11.65 million in 2017. The buyer intended to renovate parts of the building for co-working space. In 2023, Expansive was sued by Centier Bank of Merrillville, Indiana, for non-payment and bankruptcy proceedings began.

== Design ==
The building was designed by Rubush & Hunter. The elevators in the building are adorned with an art-deco motif featuring a black-and-gold color scheme with various carvings. King Tut's tomb had been discovered in 1922 and The Indianapolis Star newspaper stated that there was a "nationwide obsession with all things Egyptian". The newspaper stated that the tomb's discovery was the reason for the Egyptian motifs which appear in the design elements of the building. There are granite sculptures in the arched entryway and Indianapolis sculptor Joseph Willenborg created a bronze grill with Egyptian figures.

The highest stories of the building are ziggurat-like, tapering back from the lower stories. A 1922 city ordinance limited buildings on the Circle to a height of no more than 108 ft (33 m). Rubush and Hunter were able to incorporate the set-back upper levels to make the building taller.

== Gallery ==
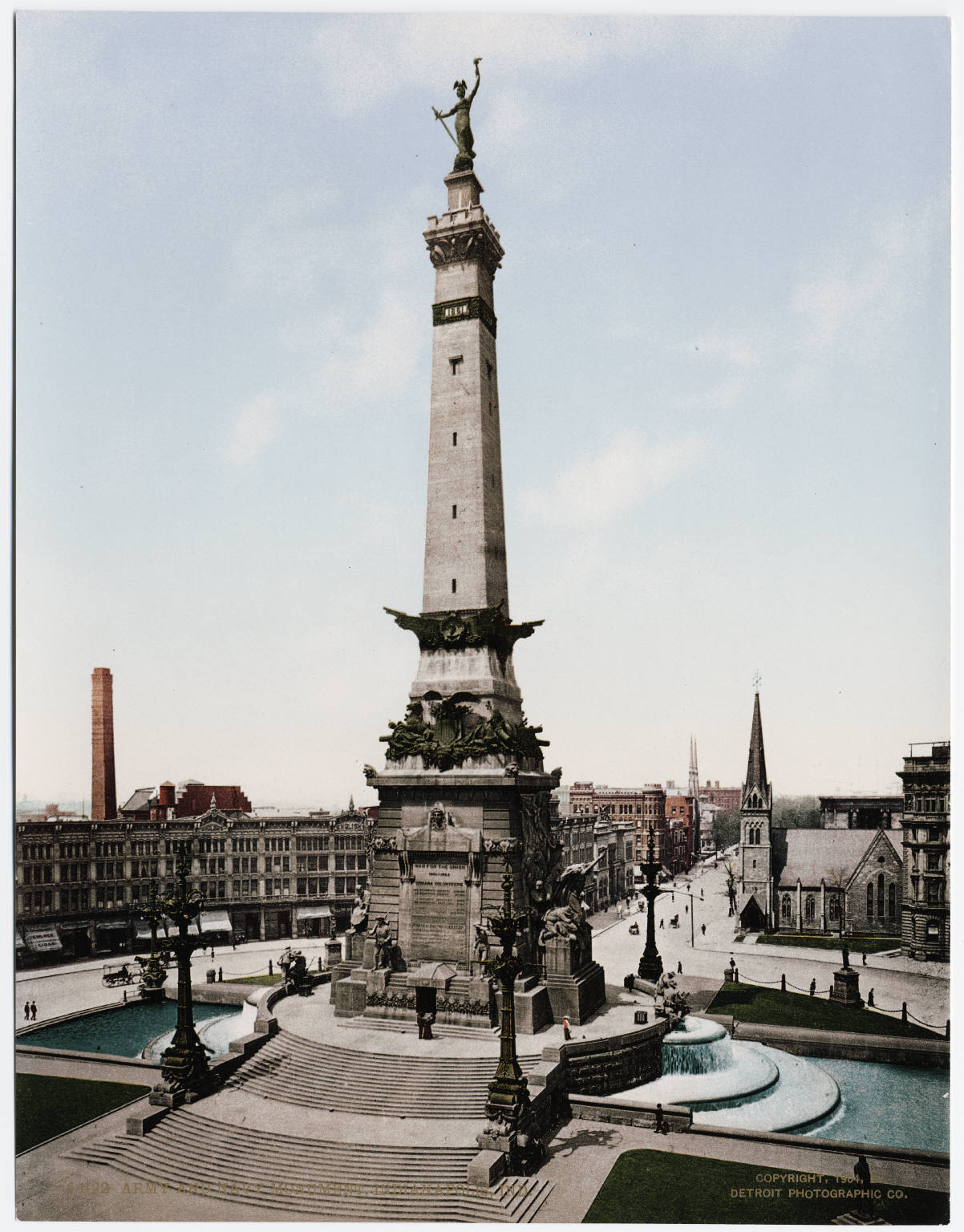
Photochrom of the Soldiers' and Sailors' Monument c. 1904 before Circle Tower

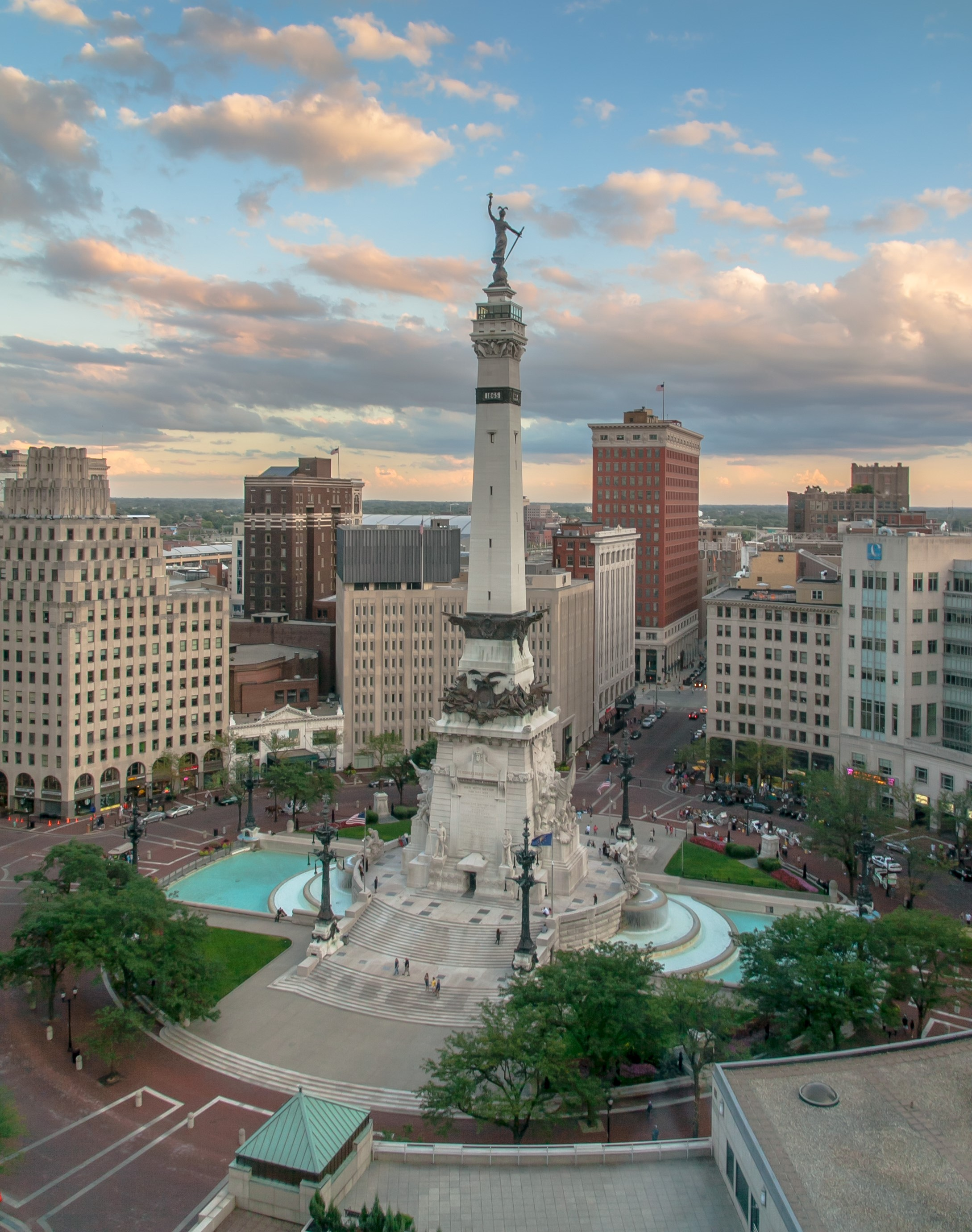
Monument Circle, with Circle Tower on the left (2014)

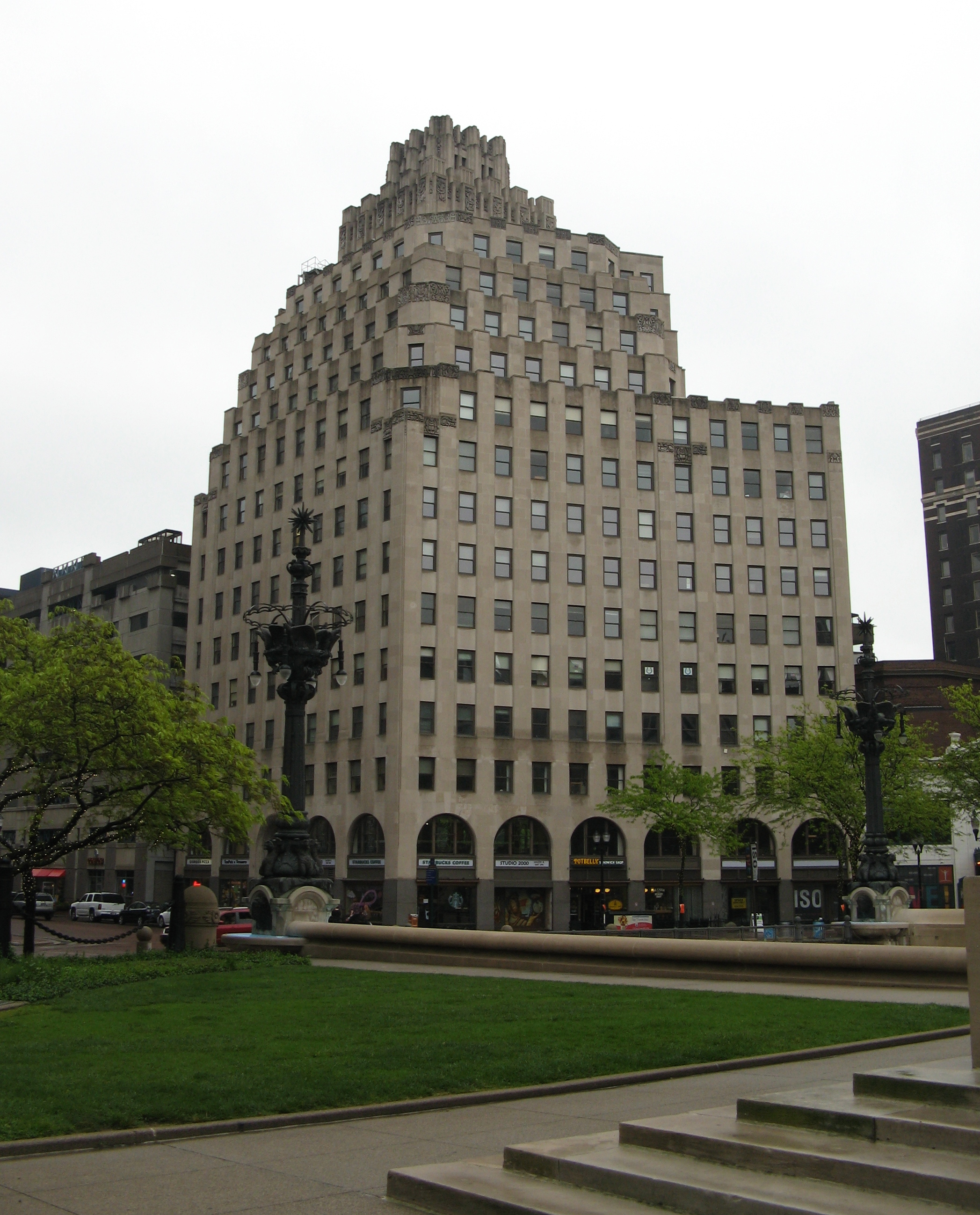
Circle Tower (2012)

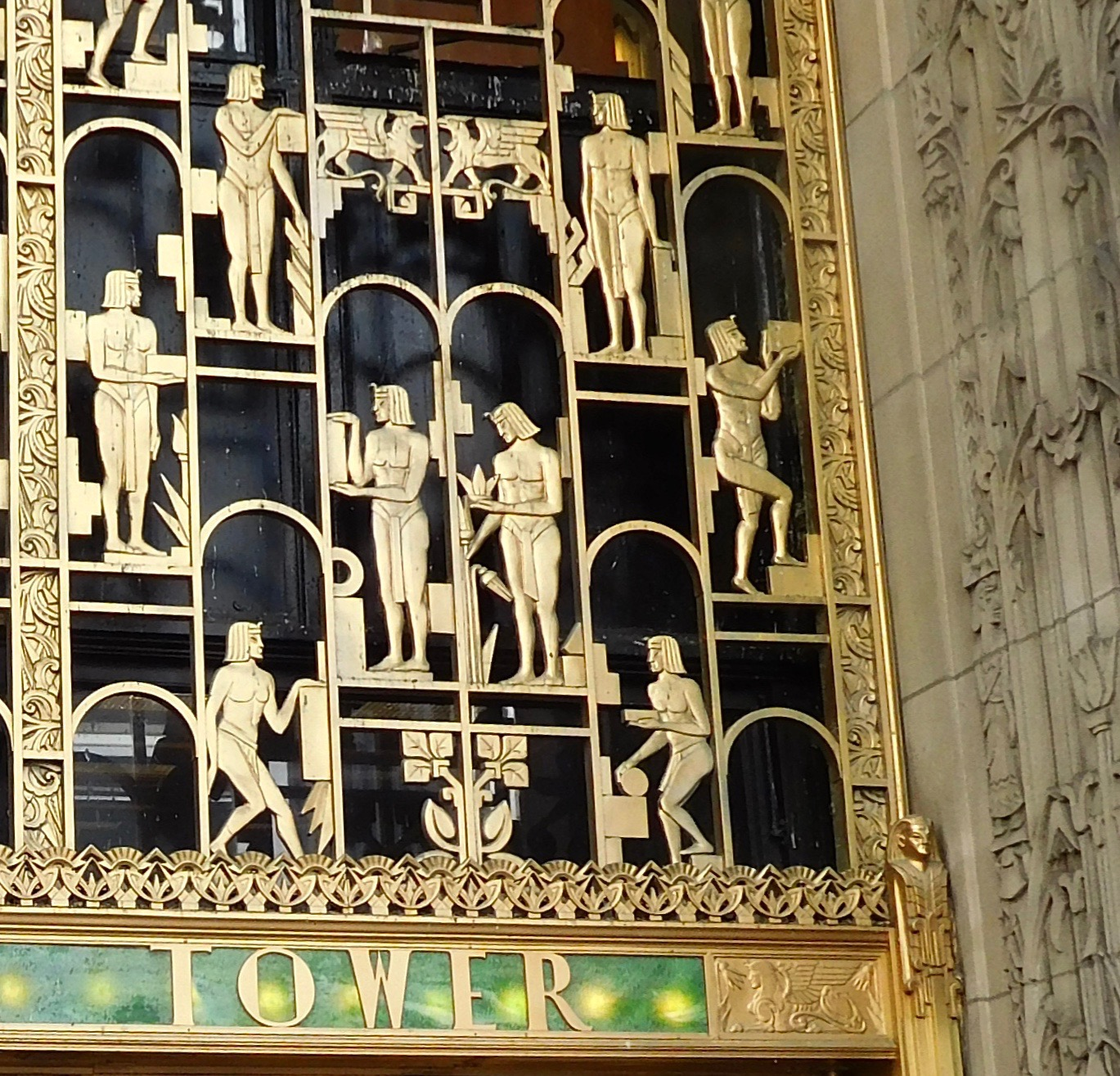
Circle Tower Egyptian design elements

== See also ==
- List of Art Deco architecture in Indiana
