= Hotel Washington (Indianapolis, Indiana) =

- U.S. National Register of Historic Places
- U.S. Historic district – Contributing property
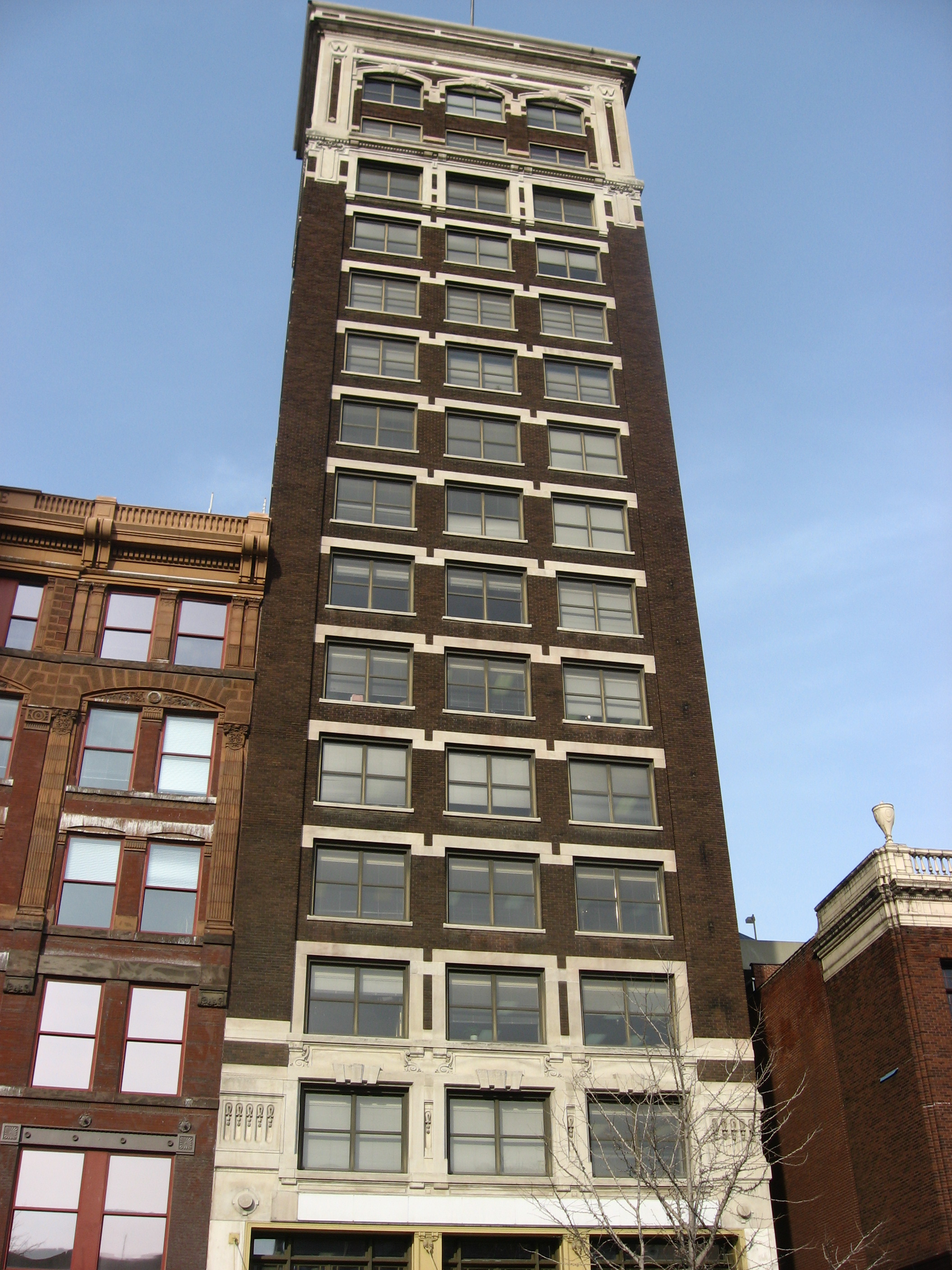
- Hotel Washington, January 2010

- Location within Indianapolis Location within Indianapolis Location within Indiana Location within the United States
- Location: 32 E. Washington St., Indianapolis, Indiana
- Coordinates: 39°46′2″N 86°9′25″W
- Area: less than one acre
- Built: 1912
- Architect: R. P. Daggett & Co.
- Architectural style: Chicago, Beaux Arts
- NRHP reference No.: 80000056
- Added to NRHP: July 17, 1980

Hotel Washington, also known as the Washington Tower, is a historic hotel building located at Indianapolis, Indiana. It was built in 1912, and is a 17-story, rectangular, Beaux-Arts style steel frame and masonry building. It is three bays wide and consists of a three-story, limestone clad base, large Chicago style window openings on the fifth to 13th floors, and arched window openings on the 17th floor. It is located next to the Lombard Building. The building has housed a hotel, apartments, and offices.

It was listed on the National Register of Historic Places in 1980. It is located in the Washington Street-Monument Circle Historic District.

== See also ==
- National Register of Historic Places listings in Center Township, Marion County, Indiana
