= Delaware Flats =

- U.S. National Register of Historic Places
- U.S. Historic district – Contributing property
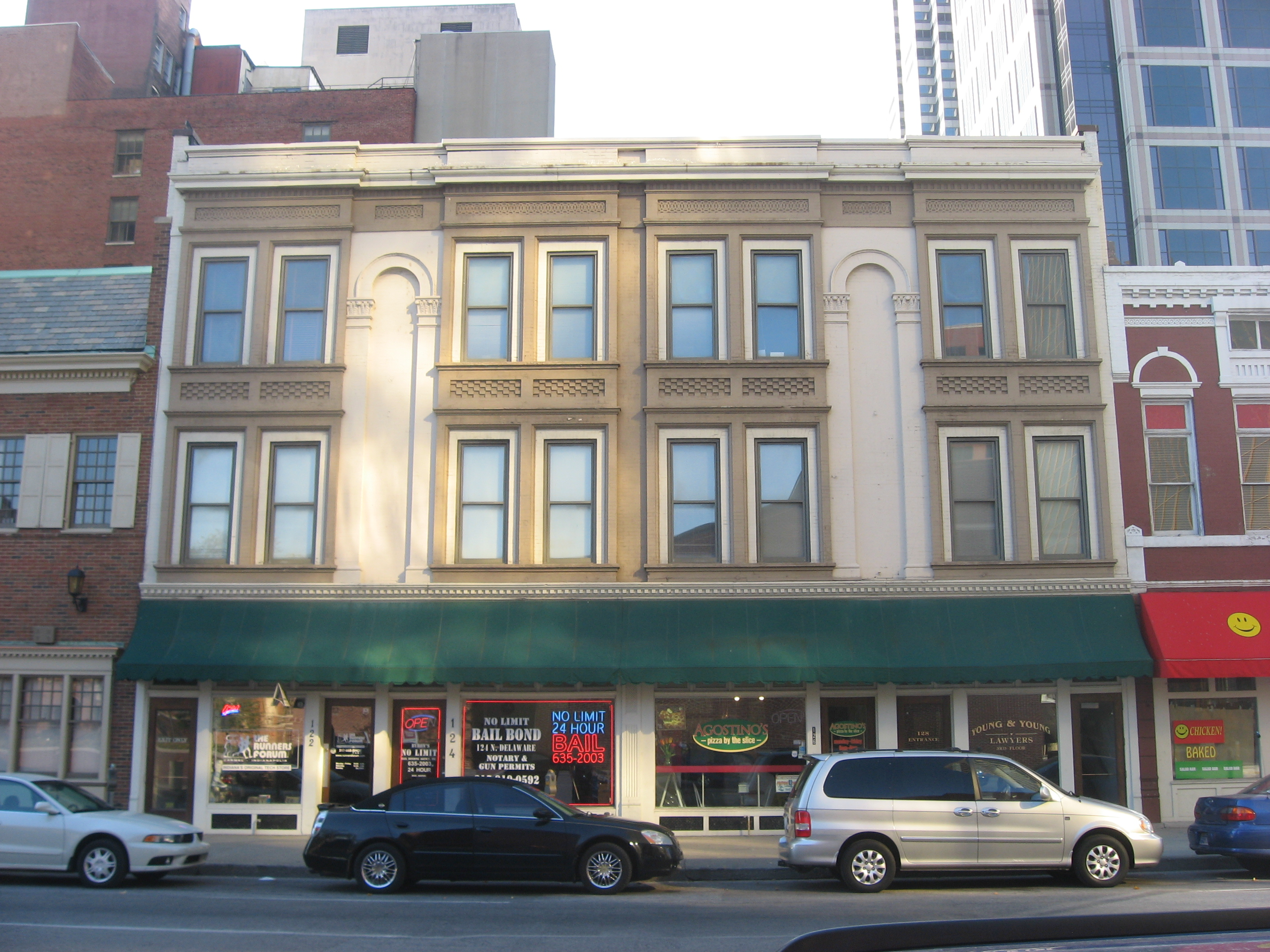
- Delaware Flats Apartments, October 2010

- Location within Indianapolis Location within Indiana Location within the United States
- Location: 120-128 N. Delaware St., Indianapolis, Indiana
- Coordinates: 39°46′8″N 86°9′16″W
- Area: less than one acre
- Built: 1887; 139 years ago
- Architectural style: Classical Revival
- MPS: Apartments and Flats of Downtown Indianapolis TR
- NRHP reference No.: 83000066
- Added to NRHP: September 15, 1983

Delaware Flats is a historic apartment building located at Indianapolis, Indiana. It was built in 1887, and is a three-story, ten bay wide, Classical Revival style painted brick and limestone building. The first floor has commercial storefronts with cast iron framing. The upper stories feature two-story blank arches with Corinthian order pilasters.

It was listed on the National Register of Historic Places in 1983. It is located in the Washington Street-Monument Circle Historic District.

It remains unclear who was the first owner of the building. There is a local tale that the ghost of a medical assistant killed in the building in 1911 haunts the building. Lynn B. Millikan bought the building that same year and turned it into the Hotel Barton. It was turned into a nursing home in 1966, and the Salvation Army eventually became the owner.

== See also ==
- Apartments and Flats of Downtown Indianapolis Thematic Resources
- National Register of Historic Places listings in Center Township, Marion County, Indiana
