= Soldiers' and Sailors' Monument (Indianapolis) =

Monument and historic site in Indianapolis, Indiana, US

- State Soldiers and Sailors Monument
- U.S. National Register of Historic Places
- U.S. National Historic Landmark District – Contributing property
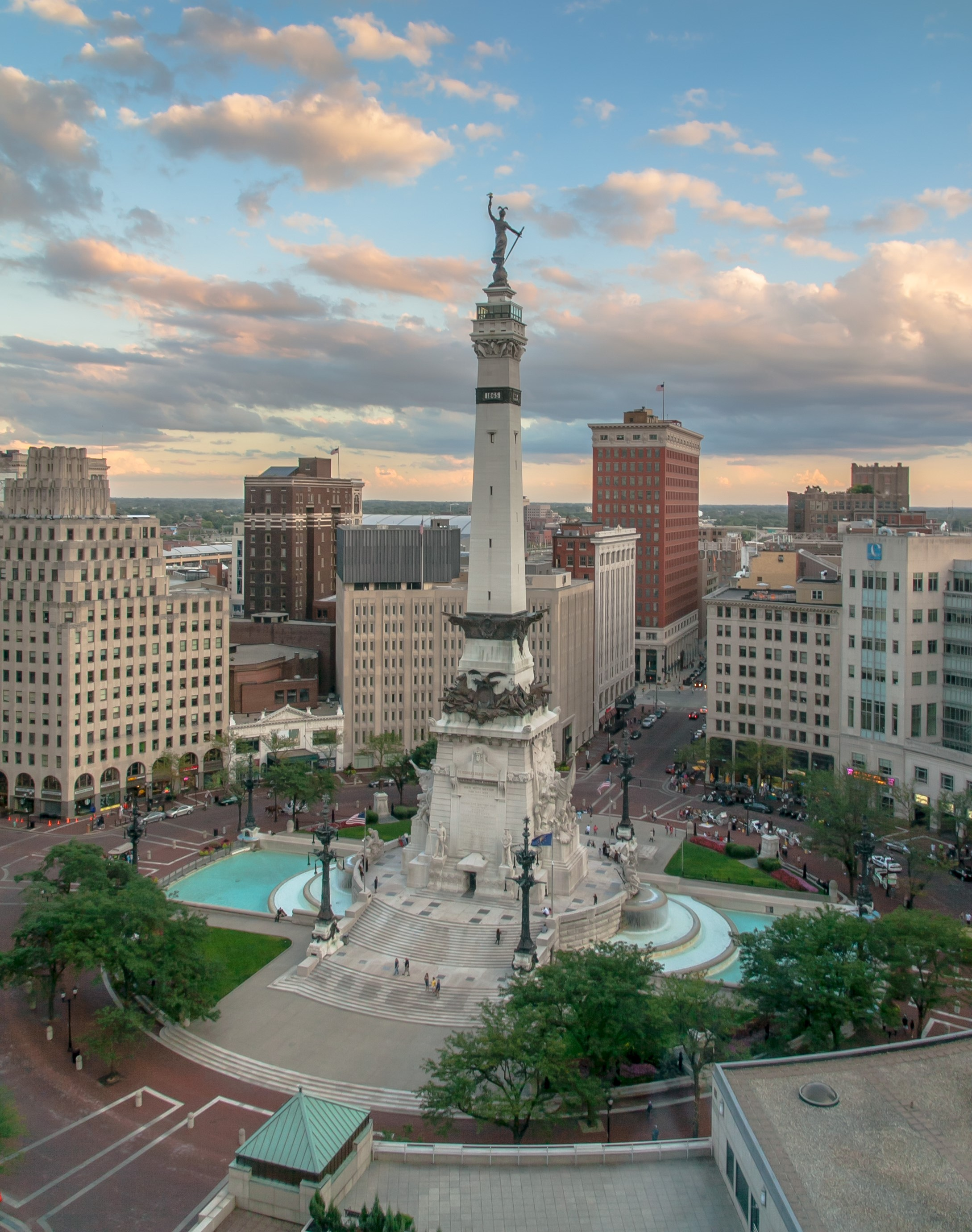
- Soldiers' and Sailors' Monument and surrounding Monument Circle

- Location within Indianapolis Location within Indianapolis Location within Indiana Location within the United States
- Location: Monument Circle; Indianapolis, Indiana, US
- Coordinates: 39°46′6″N 86°9′29″W
- Area: 1 acre (0.40 ha)
- Built: 1888
- Architect: Bruno Schmitz
- Part of: Indiana World War Memorial Plaza Historic District (ID89001404)
- NRHP reference No.: 73000040

Significant dates
- Added to NRHP: February 23, 1973
- Designated NHLDCP: December 23, 2016

The Indiana State Soldiers and Sailors Monument is a 284 ft 6 in (86.72 m) tall neoclassical monument built on Monument Circle, a circular, brick-paved street that intersects Meridian and Market streets in the center of downtown Indianapolis, Indiana. In the years since its public dedication on May 15, 1902, the monument has become an iconic symbol of Indianapolis, the state capital of Indiana. It was added to the National Register of Historic Places on February 13, 1973, and was included in an expansion of the Indiana World War Memorial Plaza National Historic Landmark District in December 2016. It is located in the Washington Street-Monument Circle Historic District. It is also the largest outdoor memorial and the largest of its kind in Indiana.

It was designed by German architect Bruno Schmitz and built over a thirteen-year period, between 1888 and 1901. The monument's original purpose was to honor Hoosiers who were veterans of the American Civil War; however, it is also a tribute to Indiana's soldiers who served during the American Revolutionary War, territorial conflicts that partially led to the War of 1812, the Mexican–American War, and the Spanish–American War. The monument is the first in the United States to be dedicated to the common soldier. The obelisk-shaped monument is built of oolitic limestone from Owen County, Indiana. It rests on a raised foundation surrounded by pools and fountains. Broad stone steps on its north and south sides lead to two terraces at its base. Stone tablets above the bronze entrance doors on the obelisk's north and south sides bear inscriptions commemorating Indiana's soldiers. An inscription above the tablets reads: "To Indiana's Silent Victors." An observation deck is accessible by stairs or elevator from the interior. Its commemorative statuary and fountains are made primarily of oolitic limestone and bronze. At the time of the monument's dedication in 1902, its cost was $598,318. It has been estimated that construction of a similar structure in 2014 would exceed $500 million.

The memorial includes several notable outdoor sculptures, including Rudolf Schwarz's two massive limestone groupings of War and Peace, two smaller scenes named The Dying Soldier and The Return Home, and four military figures at its base. Three astragals, one by Nikolaus (Nicolaus) Geiger and two others by George T. Brewster, surround the stone obelisk. Additional sculptures include John H. Mahoney's bronze statues of George Rogers Clark, William Henry Harrison, and James Whitcomb, and Franklin Simmons's bronze statue of Oliver P. Morton. Brewster's 30-foot (9.1 m) bronze statue of Victory crowns the obelisk. The Indianapolis monument is approximately 21 feet (6.4 m) shorter than New York City's Statue of Liberty, and at the time of completion, was the second-tallest monument in the United States, behind the Washington Monument.

== History ==
Originally the plot of land at the center of Indianapolis was used as a public gathering place, the site of the Indiana governor's residence, and a city park. Construction on the monument began in 1888 and was dedicated in 1902.

=== Governor's Circle and Circle Park ===
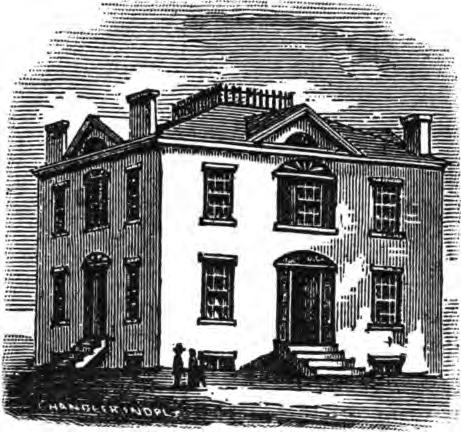
The second Indiana Governor's Residence, built on the Circle in 1827.

The original plan of Indianapolis, founded in 1821, and platted by Alexander Ralston, included a circular, 80-foot (24 m) wide street that surrounded a circular, 3-acre (1.2 ha) plot of land as the focal point at the center of town. The site was originally called the Governor's Circle because of its designation as the future site of the Indiana governor's residence. The Circle was a hub of community life from the town's beginning in 1821. It was used as a gathering place for religious services before the town's churches were built. A weekly market was held on the site from 1822 to 1824.

A governor's residence was built on the Circle in 1827. Due to the mansion's public location and poor construction, no governor ever lived there; however, it was used as offices for Indiana's Supreme Court justices, the Indiana State Library, and the State Bank of Indiana. It was also a site for civic events and celebrations such as inaugural balls for new governors, fundraising events for charity, military receptions, Fourth of July celebrations, and community meetings. By 1851 the building had deteriorated. It was torn down in 1857, and the site became a vacant lot.

As Indianapolis grew and developed during and after the Civil War, the area became a popular meeting place for mass gatherings, public rallies, and celebrations of wartime victories. In 1867 the site was cleaned up, fenced, and designated as the city's Circle Park. The park remained vacant until 1884, when a bronze statue of Oliver P. Morton, Indiana's Civil War-era governor, was erected at its center. Franklin Simmons, an American sculptor living in Rome, Italy, and a noted sculptor of other Civil War memorial statues, created the statue of Morton, which was surrounded by an iron fence. Dedication ceremonies took place on June 15, 1884, with Indiana governor Conrad Baker presiding. Senator Benjamin Harrison and Colonel William Dudley delivered speeches during the event.

=== Monument proposals ===
Many times after the Civil War suggestions were made to build a monument honoring Indiana's Civil War veterans. The first proposal was made on April 1, 1862, when an anonymous editorial in the Indianapolis Daily Journal suggested a monument be erected in Circle Park; however, no action was taken. Talk of a monument continued in the years following the war. In 1867 governor Morton suggested a monument be erected on the highest point in Crown Hill Cemetery, but nothing came of it. In 1872 William H. English addressed a group of Civil War veterans and expressed his support for a monument at Crown Hill, but a bill introduced in the state legislature failed to pass. Other potential sites for the monument included University Park, Military Park, and the corner of Washington and Illinois streets in the city's downtown business district, along the National Road.

No progress was made on the monument until August 1875, when George J. Langsdale, a newspaper editor of the Greencastle Banner, presented a plan for a memorial during the first reunion of Civil War veterans, which was held in Indianapolis. Langsdale's idea was favorably received and a monument association was formed. By 1887 the Indiana Department of the Grand Army of the Republic had raised $23,380, before relinquishing responsibility for the monument to the State of Indiana.

Further action was taken on March 3, 1887, when the Indiana General Assembly passed a bill to form a monument commission, whose original members included Samuel B. Voyles, D. C. McCollum, Daniel M. Ransdell, George J. Johnson, James, G. Gookins, and Langsdale, who was elected the committee's president at its first meeting on June 28, 1887. Randsell, who resigned two years later, was replaced by Thomas W. Bennett, and William H. English replaced Bennett. Other commissioners included General Mahlon D. Manson, and Thomas A. Morris. The bill also authorized the monument to be built in Indianapolis and appropriated $200,000 for the project. Some state legislators disagreed over use of the Circle as the monument's site; however, the legislative act that authorized it specifically identified the intended site as Circle Park.

=== Design and construction ===
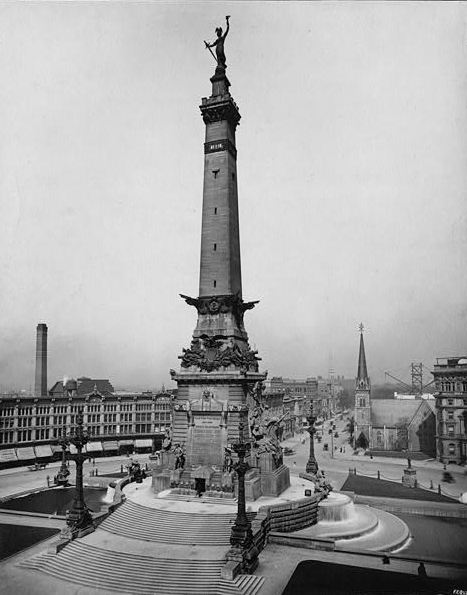
The Soldiers' and Sailors' Monument in Indianapolis about 1898

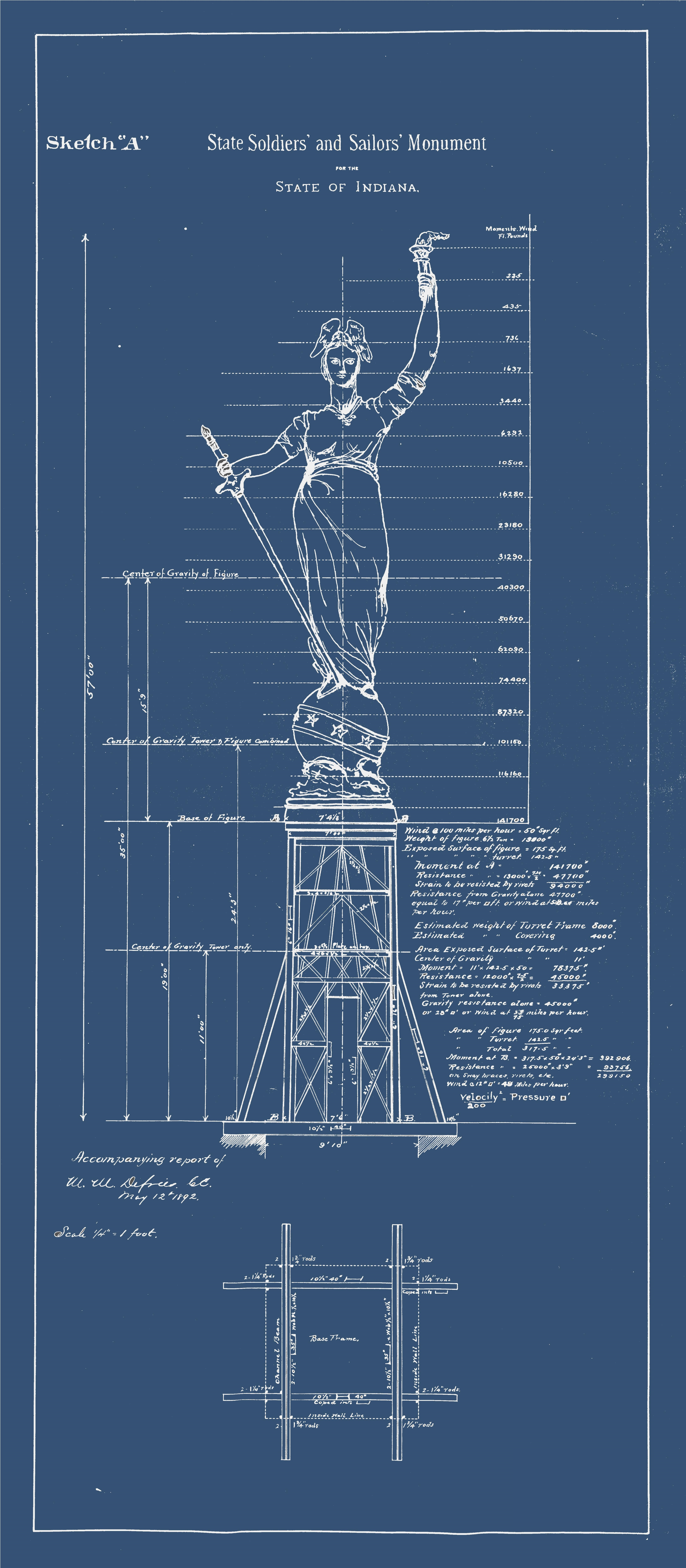
1892 blueprint for Lady Victory

To select a design for the new monument, the commission established an international contest and solicited ten architects to submit sketches. Notices were also placed in leading newspapers in the United States, Canada, England, France, Germany, and Italy, to encourage others to submit their ideas. The contest deadline was set for January 12, 1888, and seventy designs were submitted. The selection committee, who initially did not know the identity of the designers, chose two entries for further consideration. Bruno Schmitz, an architect from Berlin, Prussia, who submitted a design called Symbol of Indiana was the commissioners' unanimous choice as the winner. Schmitz, an architect knowledgeable in the field of monument design, was also a friend and fellow artist of the commission's secretary, James F. Gookins, when the two lived in Munich, Germany. Percy Stone, of London, England, received $500 for his second-prize entry.

Several individuals and companies were involved in the monument's construction. Schmitz received his commission as the project's supervising architect in February 1888. His contract for the project specified his commission as five percent of the monument's total cost. Schmitz arrived in Indianapolis from Germany in January 1889. Frederick Bauman, of Chicago, was appointed the project's deputy architect and Schmitz's representative. Enos Hege, of Indianapolis, received the contract to erect the monument's foundation, which was completed in 1888, and Thomas McIntosh, of Greencastle, Indiana, and an expert in stonework, became the project's superintendent. The Terre Haute Stone Works Company was awarded the contract to construct the monument's terraces, approaches, and superstructure. The project's stone and bronze sculptors included Rudolph Schwarz, Nikolaus (or Nicolaus) Geiger, George Brewster, and John Mahoney. Although ambiguous language in the authorizing bill created some confusion over the type of memorial to be erected, either a single monument or a combination of monument and memorial hall, the controversy was cleared up in 1893, six years after the bill's initial passage, when its confusing statement was repealed. In the meantime, construction continued using Schmitz's design.

The cornerstone was laid on August 22, 1889. Inside, a copper box contained, among other items, an official list of all Indiana soldiers who had served in the Civil War, newspapers, copies of Indiana's two constitutions, a thirty-eight-star American flag, a photograph of Schmitz, the ceremony's program, and other related paraphernalia from the Grand Army of the Republic, the Women's Relief Corps, the Sons of the Republic, and other groups. Ceremonies held on the northeast corner of the monument included a speech by President Benjamin Harrison, an artillery salute, and a parade. Members of Harrison's cabinet, Indiana's governor Alvin P. Hovey, and other state officials were present. The Department Commander of the Grand Army of the Republic was master of ceremonies. It was the first monument in the United States to be dedicated to the common soldier.

Public donations and the Indiana General Assembly's initial appropriations were not sufficient to fund the complete project. More funds were required. The state legislature appropriated an additional $160,000, and in 1891, raised over $123,000 with an additional property tax. Construction on the monument, which began in 1888, took thirteen years to complete. The obelisk was completed in 1892, the main elements by 1894, and its final installations in 1901. In 1893 the circle was renamed Monument Place. The cost to complete the monument was $598,318. An estimate to erect a similar structure in 2014 suggests it would exceed $500 million.

=== Dedication ===
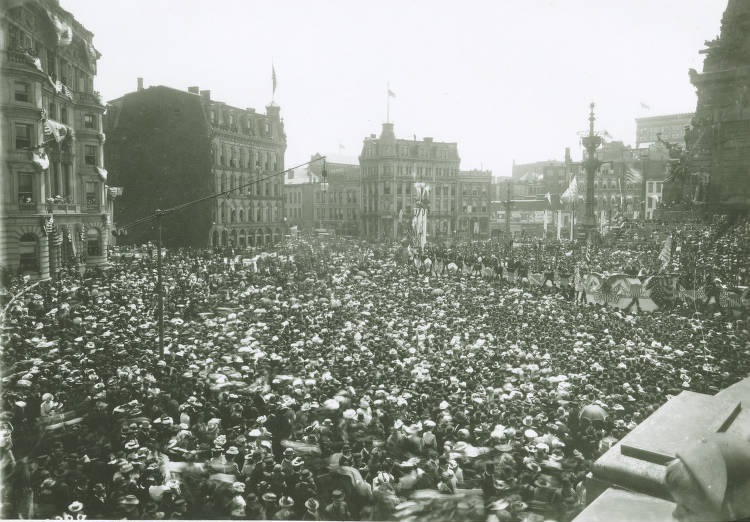
Crowds gathered for the Soldiers' and Sailors' Monument dedication ceremony, looking east towards Market Street.

The monument was formally dedicated on May 15, 1902. Thousands came to the public event, which began at 8 a.m. with a parade of flags and veterans of the Mexican-American, Civil, and Spanish–American Wars, and ended with an evening fireworks display. The formal dedication ceremony was held at 10 a.m. with General Lew Wallace as the master of ceremonies. General David R. Lucas led the gathering in prayer, and Governor Winfield T. Durbin, Wallace, and John W. Foster, the former United States Secretary of State under President Benjamin Harrison, gave speeches. A male chorus sang and poet James Whitcomb Riley read his poem "The Soldier", which was written especially for the occasion. Musicians played John Philip Sousa's "The Messiah of the Nations", a march he had composed for the occasion. Following a second parade in the afternoon and an evening vesper service, the bells of Christ Church sounded and its choir sang "My Country, 'Tis of Thee".

=== Later history ===
The monument has been modified and updated several times since its dedication in 1902.

- In 1918, a museum opened in the basement of the monument with equipment and artifacts from the Civil War.
- In 1928, Floodlights were added to the surrounding candelabra.
- Starting in the Christmas season of 1945, the monument has been decorated. In 1962, it was first decorated as the "world's largest Christmas tree", with garlands and cables of lights stretching to the top.
- The monument was listed on the National Register of Historic Places on February 13, 1973.
- A series of repairs to the monument began in September 2009. Angled windows, which had allowed some rain to seep in, were replaced with vertical windows, and steel supports for the Victory statue were replaced. The Monument's observation deck reopened on November 28 of that year.
- In April 2011, Victory was removed for restoration and returned to its original position atop the monument.
- In August 2026, the monument's observation deck was reopened after renovations.

== Exterior design ==
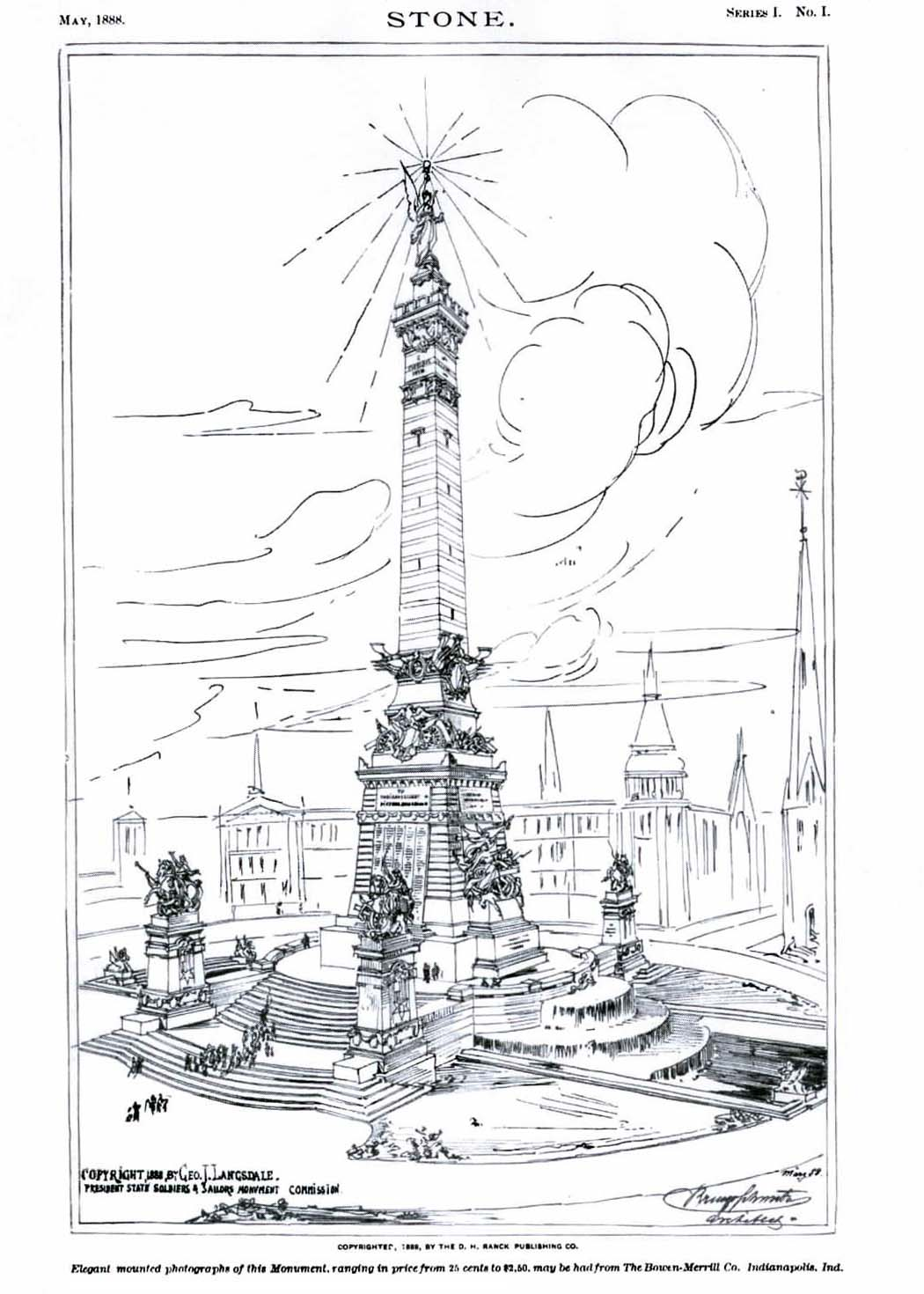
1888 rendering of the monument from STONE magazine

The monument is built at the center of Monument Circle, a circular, brick-paved street that intersects Meridian and Market streets at the center of downtown Indianapolis. The neoclassical-style obelisk is built of oolitic limestone from the Romona Stone Company quarries in Owen County, Indiana. It rests on a raised foundation measuring 30 feet (9.1 m) in depth, surrounded by pools and fountains. Broad stone steps on the north and south sides, each 70 feet (21 m) in length, lead to two terraces at the base of the monument. The obelisk's base measures 52 feet (16 m) in diameter and 12 feet (3.7 m) in diameter near the top, beneath its capital. The obelisk and its crowning figure of Victory measure 284 ft 6 in (86.72 m) tall. It is 15 feet (4.6 m) shorter than New York City's Statue of Liberty. Eight stone eagles support the capital, which includes a balcony and a 19-foot (5.8 m) turret to support the Victory statue.

Limestone tablets above the bronze entrance doors on the north and south sides of the obelisk bear inscriptions commemorating Indiana's soldiers who served in the American Revolutionary War and the capture of Vincennes from the British in 1779, the War of 1812 and related Indian wars (1811–12), the Mexican–American War (1846–48), and the American Civil War (1861–65). An inscription above the tablets reads: "To Indiana’s Silent Victors."

=== Sculptures ===
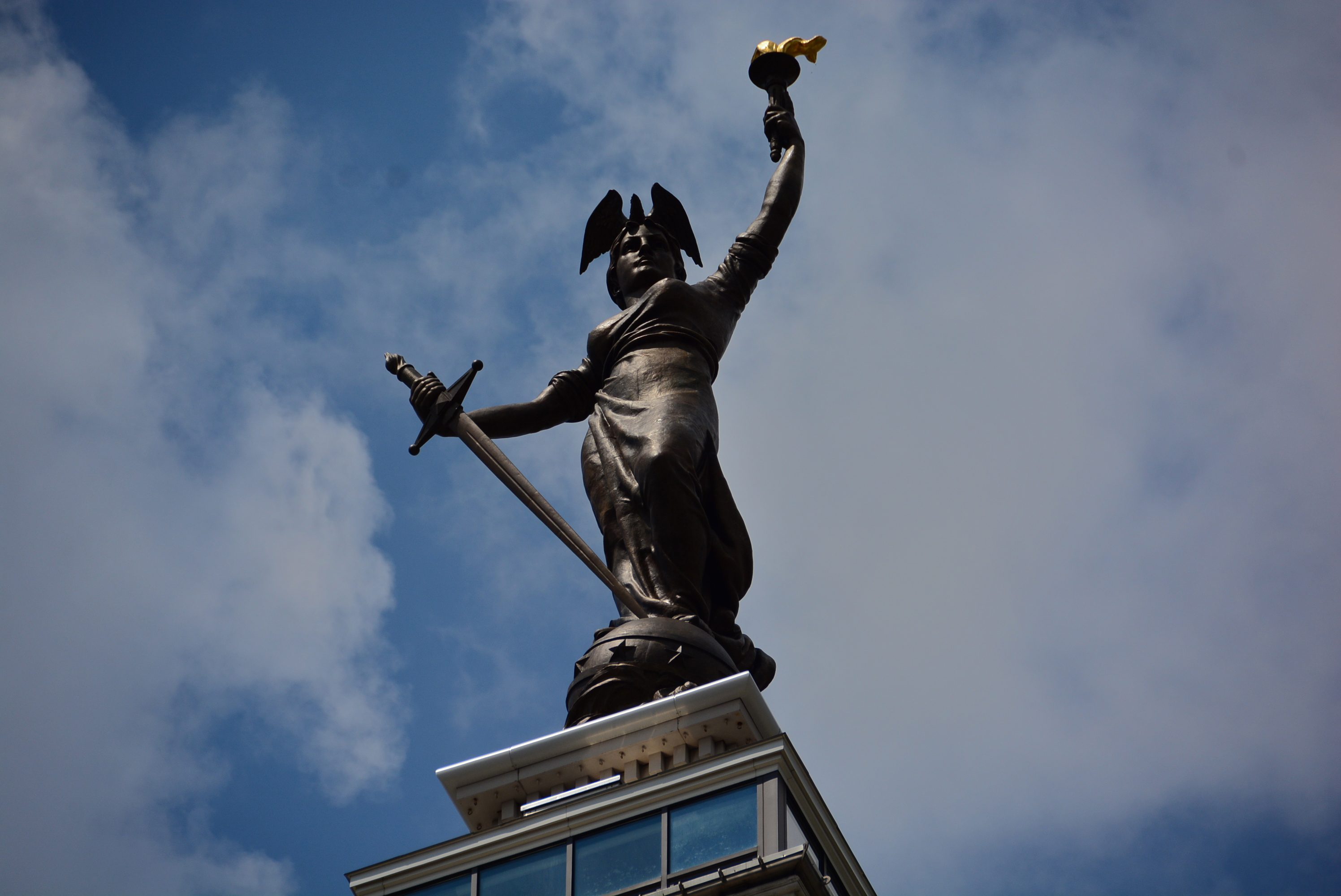
Victory adorns the top of the monument (2015).

Bruno Schmitz hired Rudolph Schwarz, an Austrian-born sculptor, to create War and Peace, two massive limestone groupings for the monument. Schwarz adapted Schmitz's original design and added two smaller scenes, The Dying Soldier and The Return Home, below the main groupings. Schwarz also carved four heroic military figures representing the artillery, cavalry, infantry, and navy for the monument's base and executed its bronze entrance doors.

Three bronze astragals, one by Nikolaus Geiger and two by George Brewster, surround the stone obelisk. The first astragal is placed 70 feet (21 m) above the obelisk's base. The second astragal is 12 feet (3.7 m) above the first. The third astragal is 80 feet (24 m) above the base, below the capital. Geiger, of Berlin, Germany, cast and shipped the first astragal, a battlefield scene of the army, from Germany. He never saw the monument at Indianapolis and died before its completion. Brewster, an American sculptor from Cleveland, Ohio, created the second astragal with a naval theme that includes a portrait relief of Admiral David Farragut. Brewster also designed the third astragal with the dates 1861 and 1865, the Civil War's beginning and ending dates.

Brewster's Victory crowns the memorial. Atop of the monument, Schmitz imagined a classical sculpture featuring a winged Nike, the Greek goddess of war, to symbolize victory in battle. The statue, which became known as Indiana or Miss Indiana, is 30 feet (9.1 m) tall and weighs ten tons. It faces south and cost $12,500. The statue also includes a symbolic sword representing victory, a torch that signifies "the light of civilization", and an eagle, a symbol of freedom.

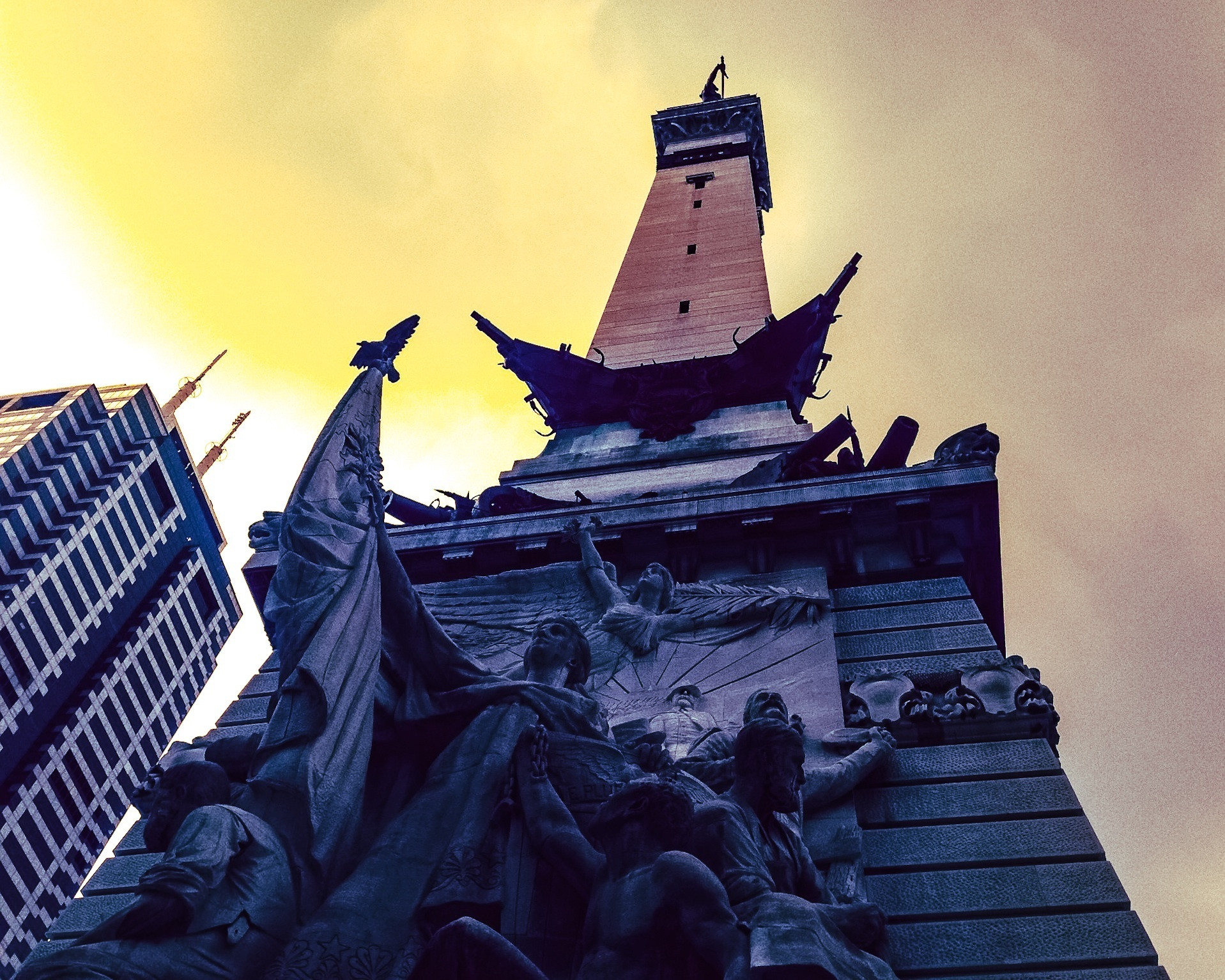
A ground view of the Monument shows sculptures at various heights.

Additional outdoor sculptures include Indianapolis sculptor John Mahoney's bronze statues of George Rogers Clark, William Henry Harrison, and James Whitcomb, and Franklin Simmons's bronze statue of Oliver P. Morton. The statue of Morton, Indiana's governor from 1861 to 1867, was erected at the center of the Circle in 1884. When construction began on the new monument, the statue of Morton was removed from its original site. It was reinstalled on the southeast side of the monument, around 1899, to represent Indiana's role in the Civil War. In 1895, Mahoney received a commission to create three additional sculptures to represent Indiana's role in earlier conflicts. His statue of Clark, on the northwest side of the monument, represents the American Revolution. The statue of Harrison, hero of the battle of Tippecanoe, is installed on the monument's northeast side and represents the War of 1812. The statue of James Whitcomb, Indiana's governor from 1843 to 1848, is installed on monument's southwest side to represent the Mexican–American War.

In 1894, the original cascading fountains were replaced with larger versions. Four large candelabra, each 40 feet (12 m) in height, were installed on pedestals at the north and south steps, while smaller candelabra were placed around the monument to illuminate the drinking fountains installed into bronze buffalo heads.

== Interior elements ==
An elevator and stairway provide access to the monument's observation deck from the base of its interior. The monument's first interior elevator began service in 1894. The elevator stops at a level just below the observation deck, requiring 31 additional steps to reach the top. The staircase contains 331 steps. The monument also houses a gift shop. The monument's basement formerly housed the Colonel Eli Lilly Civil War Museum, but water leakage in 2018 forced the museum to be moved to the Indiana War Memorial building. In 2019, 369,104 guests visited the monument.

== Legacy ==
In the years since its public dedication on May 15, 1902, the monument has become an iconic symbol of Indianapolis. It is the first monument in the United States to be dedicated to the common soldier, and the largest outdoor memorial and the largest of its kind in Indiana. The monument was included in the National Register of Historic Places on February 13, 1973.

In 2011, the American Planning Association recognized Monument Circle as one of nation's "great public spaces" in its annual "Great Places in America" ranking.

The minor league Indy Eleven soccer team features Victory prominently in their logo.

The Indianapolis city police have the monument as a feature of their badge.

== Monument Circle ==
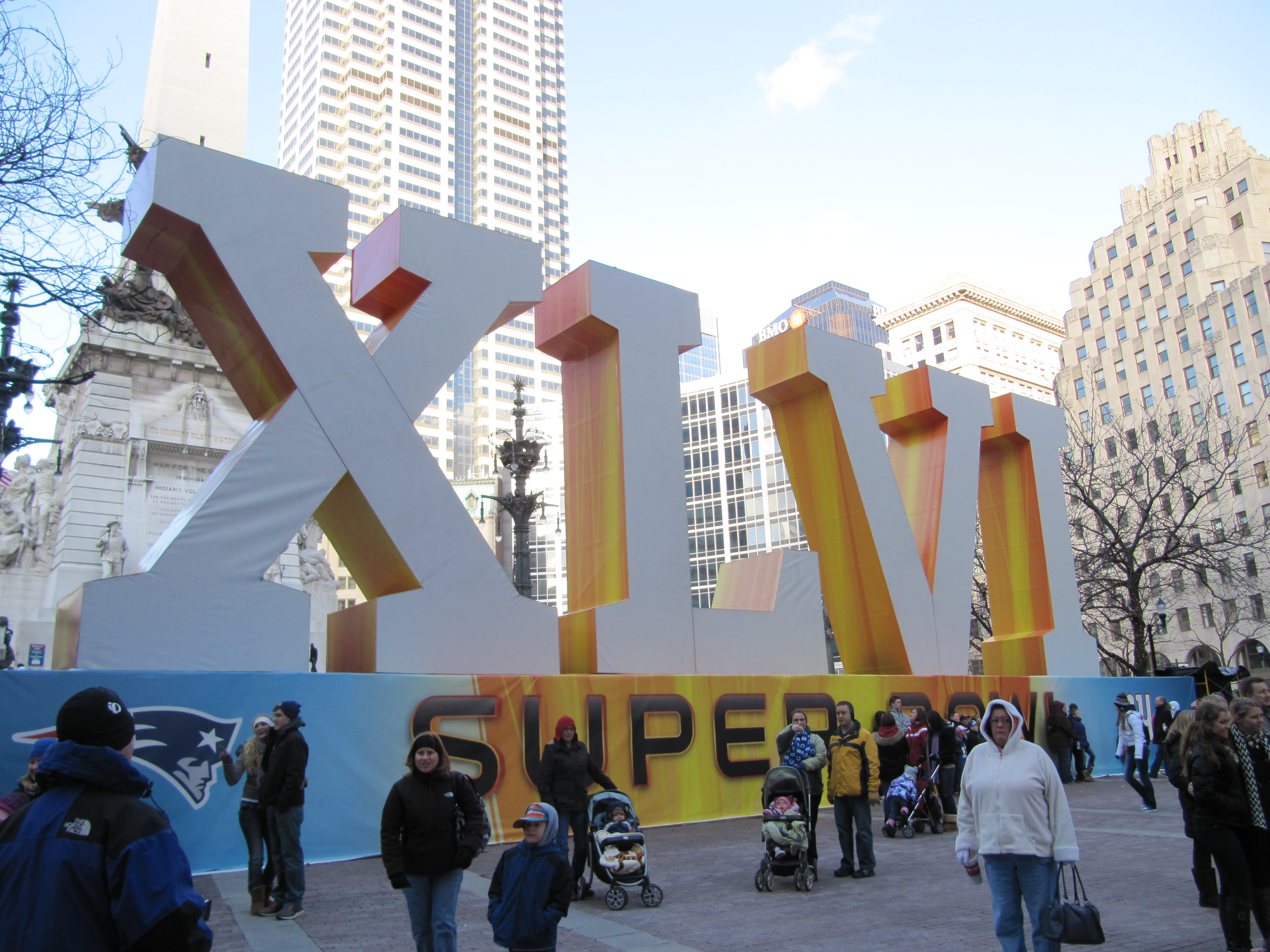
Monument Circle during Super Bowl XLVI in 2012

The monument is surrounded by the 342-foot (104 m) diameter Monument Circle. The Circle is lined with retail shops, studios for several local radio stations, the Hilbert Circle Theatre (home of the Indianapolis Symphony Orchestra), financial institutions, the Columbia Club (one of the oldest social clubs of Indiana), Christ Church Cathedral, and the AES Indiana corporate headquarters.

The Circle Tower is a 1930 building in the southeast quadrant of Monument Circle. The 111,000 sq ft (10,300 m^{2}) building features an Egyptian-motif with other design details that include an ornate lobby.

Monument Circle is a prominent public gathering place in Indianapolis to commemorate notable events, including concerts, political demonstrations, and photo opportunities.

The flag of Indianapolis includes a graphic representation of Monument Circle and the two streets (Meridian and Market) that intersect it.

== Circle of Lights ==
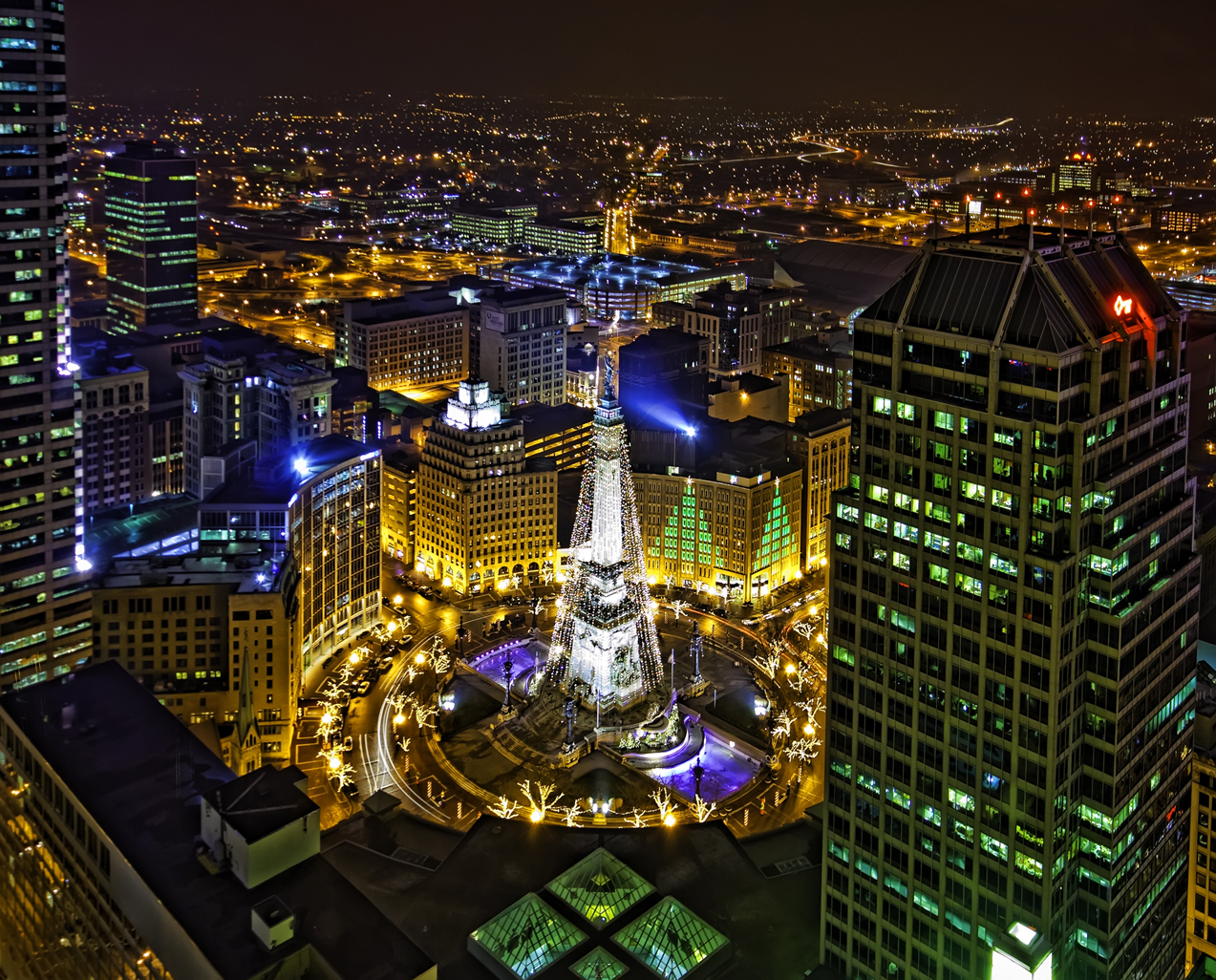
Monument Circle decorated for the Circle of Lights in 2009

During the Christmas season the monument is decorated as an enormous Christmas tree. This annual city tradition, which became known as the Circle of Lights, began in 1962. The tree lighting ceremony is held the day after Thanksgiving by the Downtown Indy Alliance. The decoration of the monument uses 4,784 lights and 52 strands of garland put in place by volunteers from the local IBEW. More than 100,000 people attend the ceremony and the event is televised to an estimated 50,000 households.

== Gallery ==
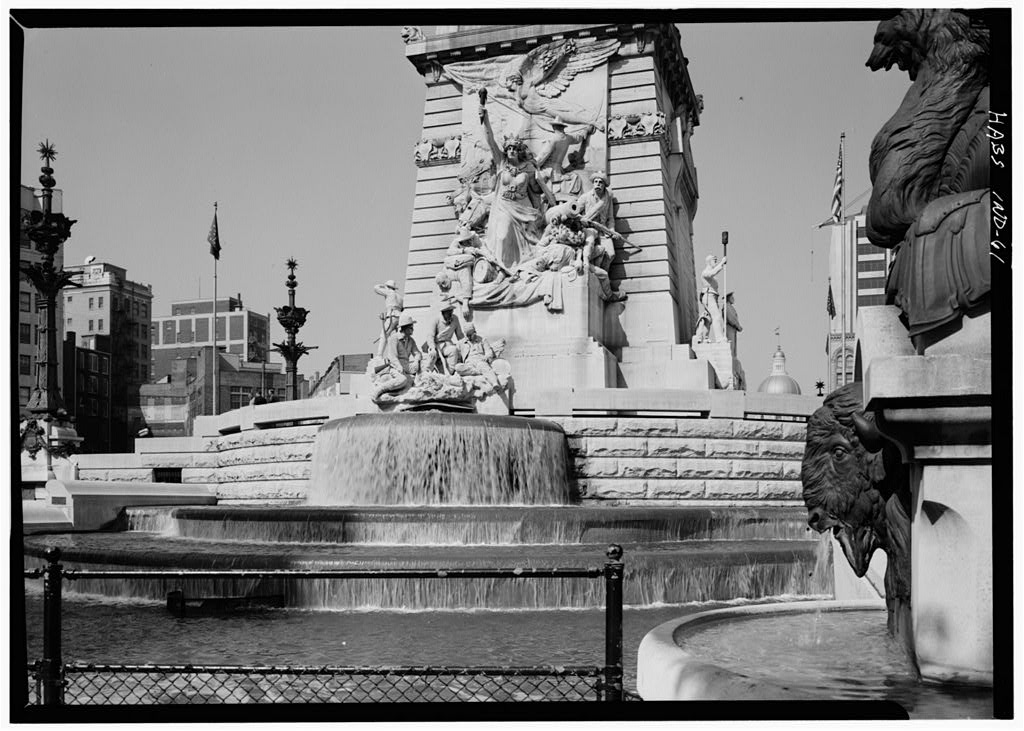
Fountain at the base

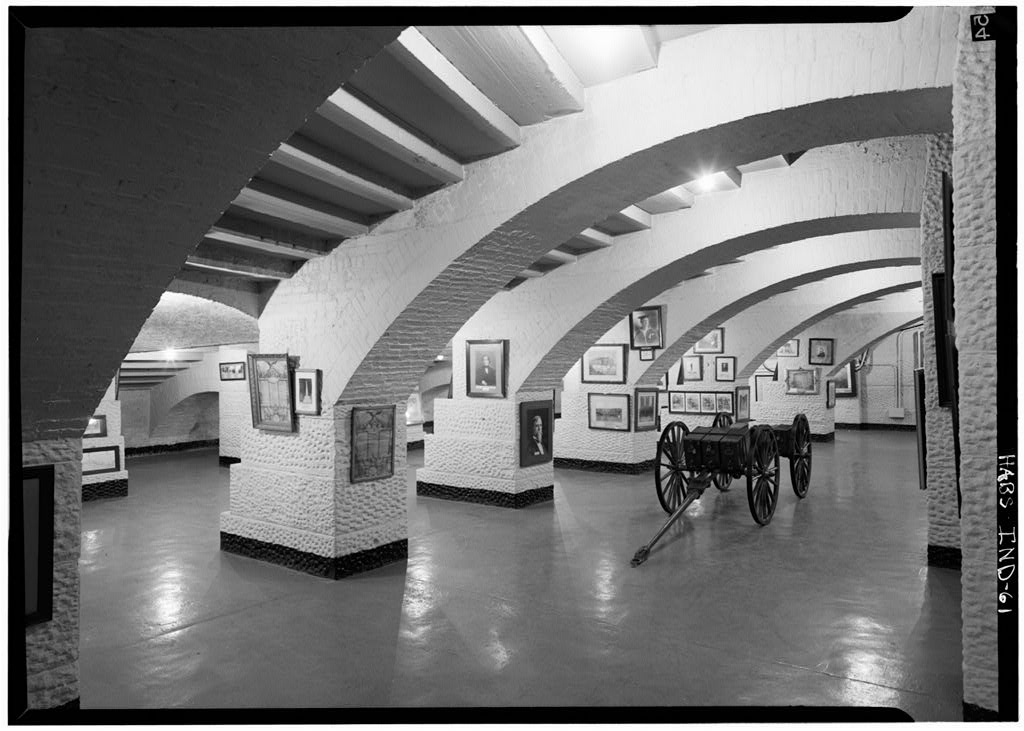
Underground arches in the museum

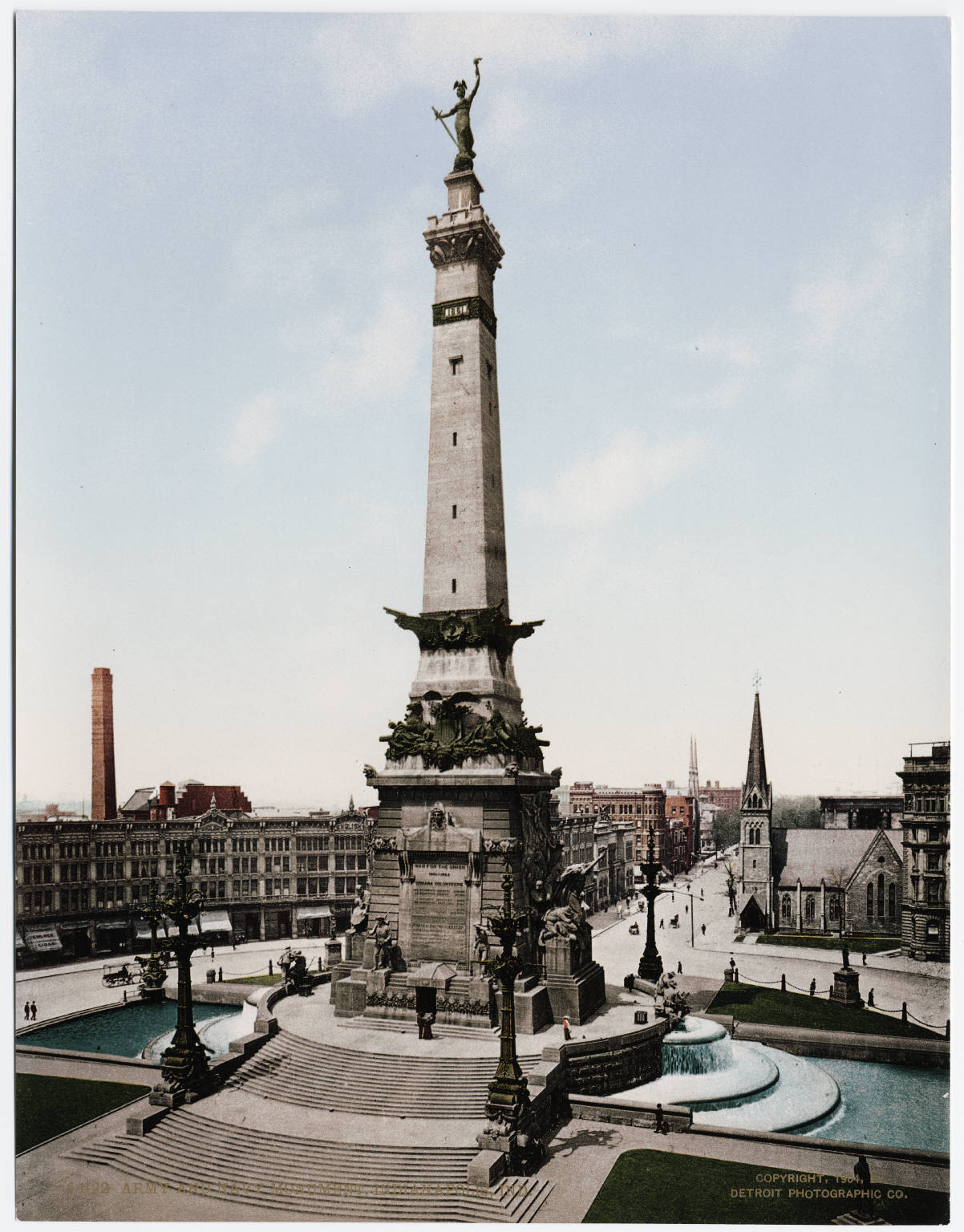
Photochrom of the Soldiers' and Sailors' Monument ca. 1904

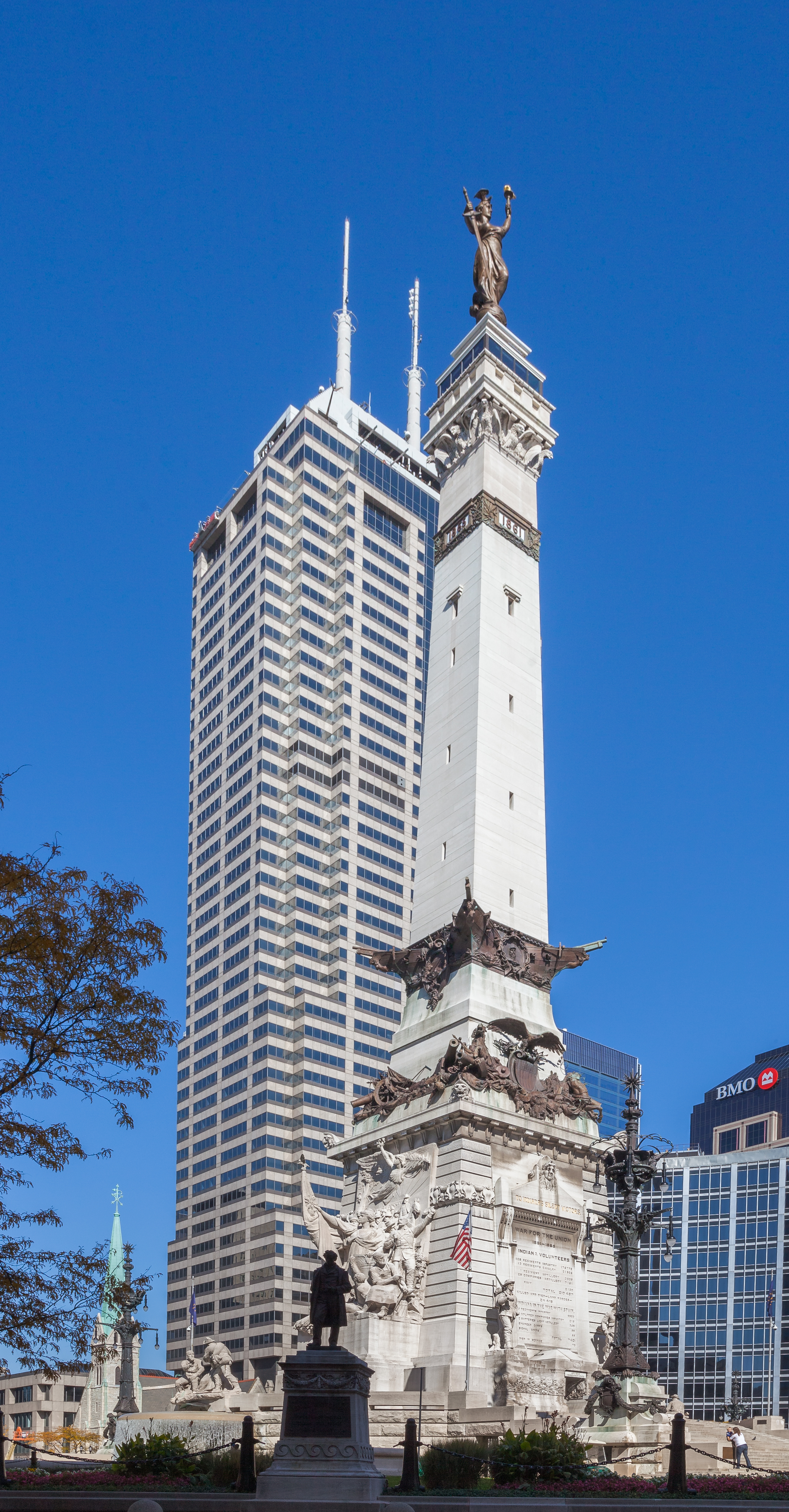
View of the monument from the southwest, with the Salesforce Tower in the background.

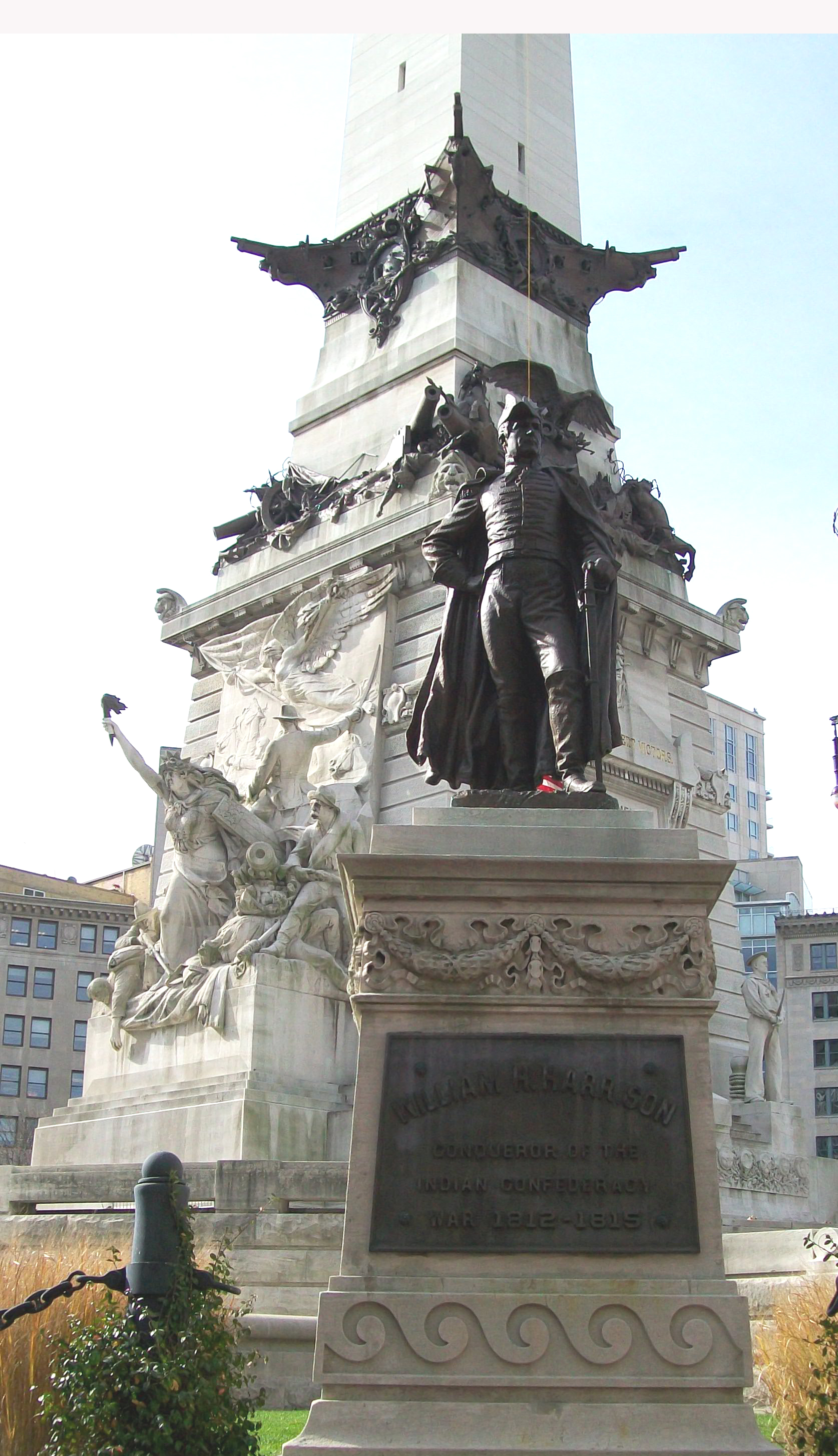
A statue of U.S. president William Henry Harrison is part of the monument.

== See also ==
- List of attractions and events in Indianapolis
- List of tallest buildings in Indianapolis § Other structures
- National Register of Historic Places listings in Center Township, Marion County, Indiana
