= Lombard Building (Indianapolis, Indiana) =

- U.S. National Register of Historic Places
- U.S. Historic district – Contributing property
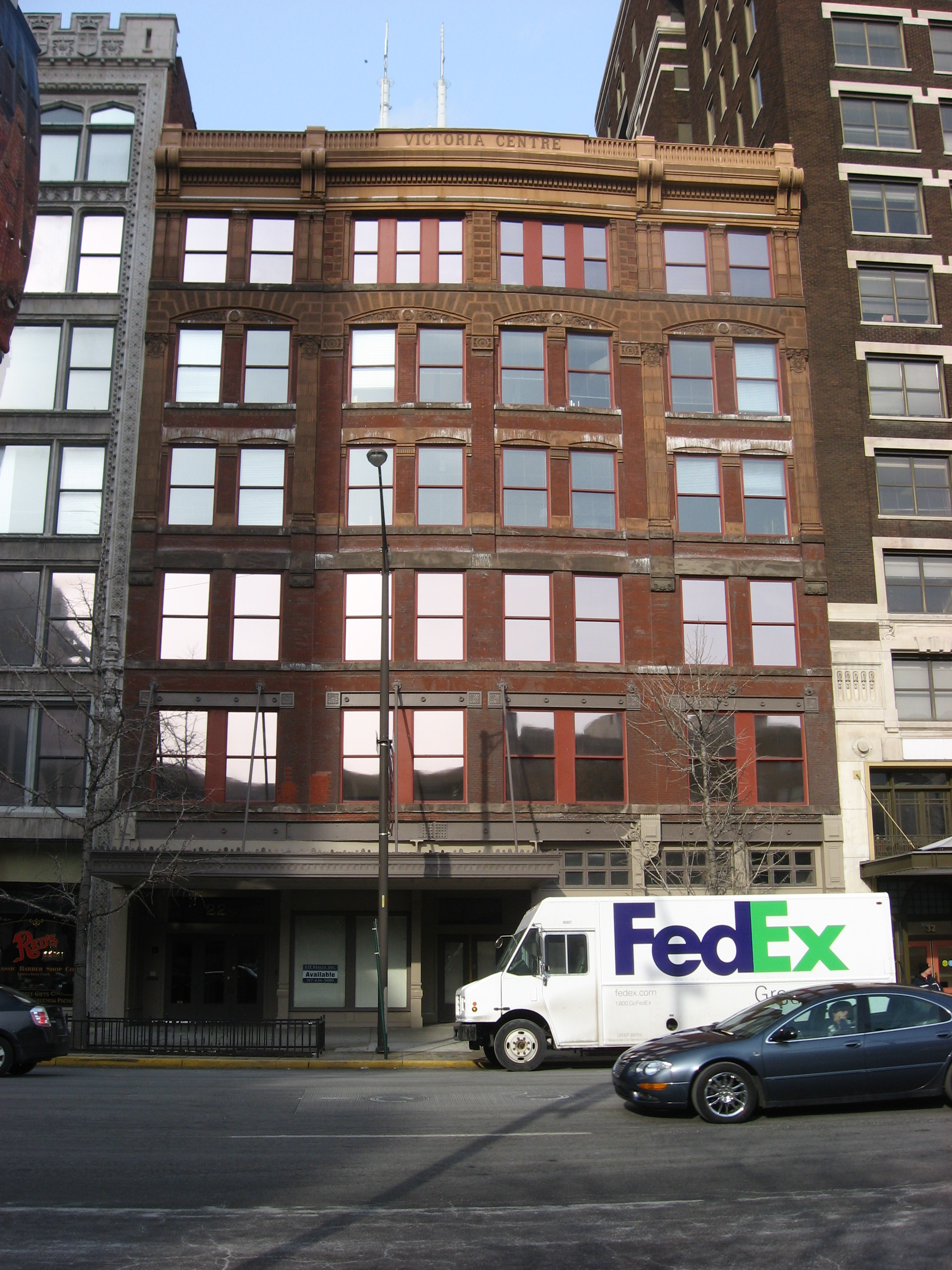
- Lombard Building, January 2010

- Location within Indianapolis Location within Indianapolis Location within Indiana Location within the United States
- Location: 22-28 E. Washington St., Indianapolis, Indiana
- Coordinates: 39°46′2″N 86°9′26″W
- Area: less than one acre
- Built: 1893
- Architect: R. P. Daggett & Co.
- Architectural style: Renaissance
- NRHP reference No.: 82000068
- Added to NRHP: June 1, 1982

Lombard Building is a historic commercial building located at Indianapolis, Indiana. It was built in 1893, and is a six-story, rectangular, Renaissance Revival style masonry, iron, and timber-framed building. The two center bays are subtly bowed on the upper stories. It is located between the Marott's Shoes Building and former Hotel Washington.

It was listed on the National Register of Historic Places in 1982. It is located in the Washington Street-Monument Circle Historic District.

== See also ==
- National Register of Historic Places listings in Center Township, Marion County, Indiana
