= The Columbia Club =

Historic building in Indianapolis, Indiana, US

- Columbia Club
- U.S. National Register of Historic Places
- U.S. Historic district – Contributing property
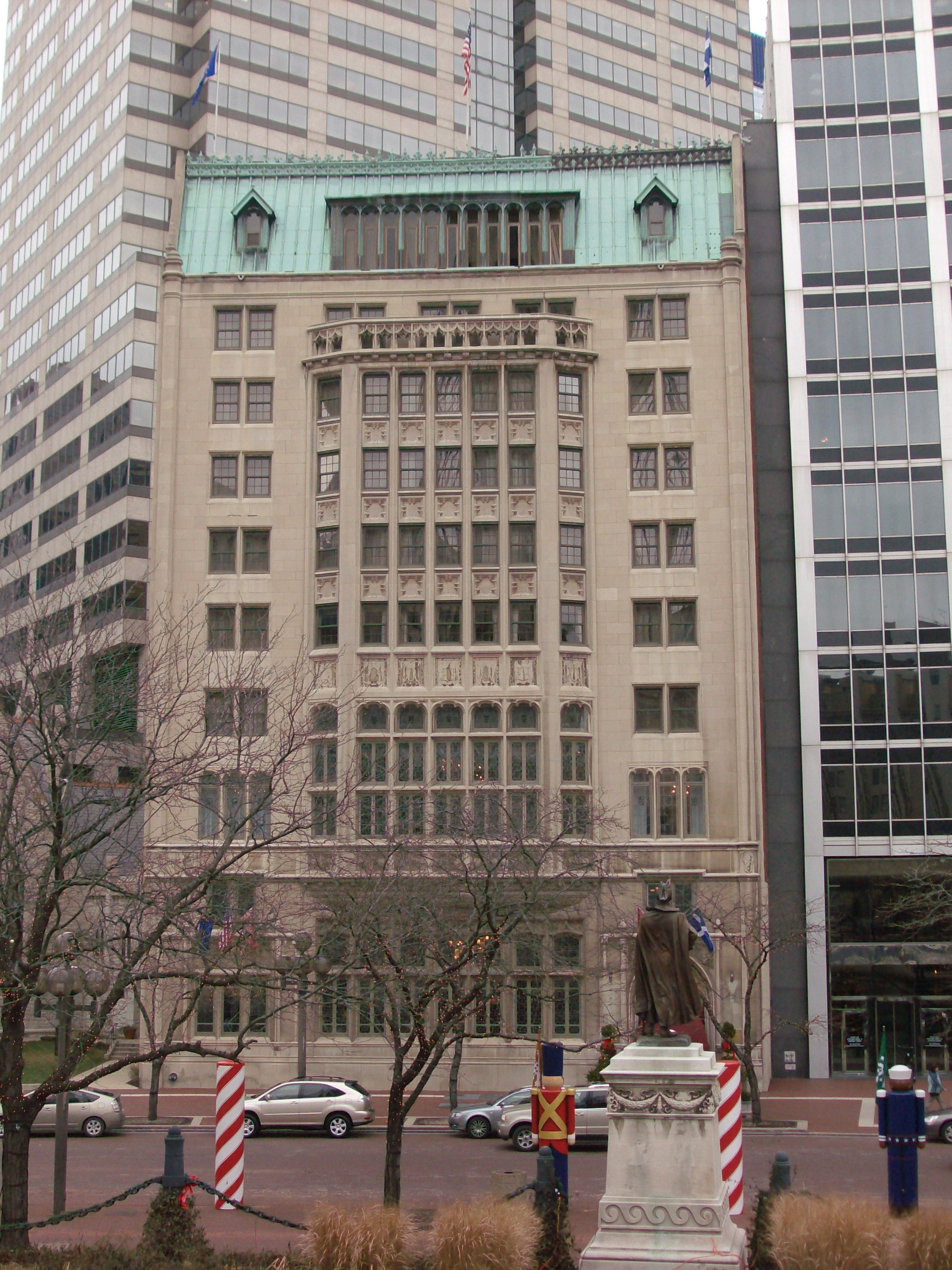
- A front view of the Columbia Club with Monument Circle in the foreground.

- Location within Indianapolis Location within Indianapolis Location within Indiana Location within the United States
- Location: 121 Monument Circle, Indianapolis, Indiana
- Coordinates: 39°46′9″N 86°9′27″W
- Built: 1925
- Architect: Rubush & Hunter
- Architectural style: Gothic Revival
- Website: columbia-club.org
- NRHP reference No.: 83000063
- Added to NRHP: January 27, 1983

The Columbia Club is a private club located on Monument Circle in downtown Indianapolis, Indiana, United States. The club was founded in 1889 and the current structure was built in 1925 as the club's third home on the same site.

== Club history ==
The Columbia Club was originally formed on February 13, 1889, by a group of prominent local Republicans as the Harrison Marching Society to support the presidential campaign of Benjamin Harrison. After the election, the society acquired a clubhouse on Monument Circle and changed its name to the Columbia Club to continue operation as a private club. Quickly growing its membership, the club evolved into the premier private club in Indianapolis. The club is no longer partisan and now numbers in its ranks Democrats and members of other parties. According to the club, the founders of the Indianapolis Motor Speedway (home of the Indianapolis 500) met there to discuss its construction. In 1984, secret meetings were held there to negotiate the move of the Baltimore Colts to Indianapolis.

Although now non-partisan, the club has hosted every Republican president since Benjamin Harrison while in office or as a candidate and serves as temporary living quarters for many Indiana state legislators during the legislative session. In addition to the thousands of business leaders and politicians who have been members, the club has also included many artists and musicians including Hoagy Carmichael and T.C. Steele. It is located in the Washington Street-Monument Circle Historic District.

== Building history ==
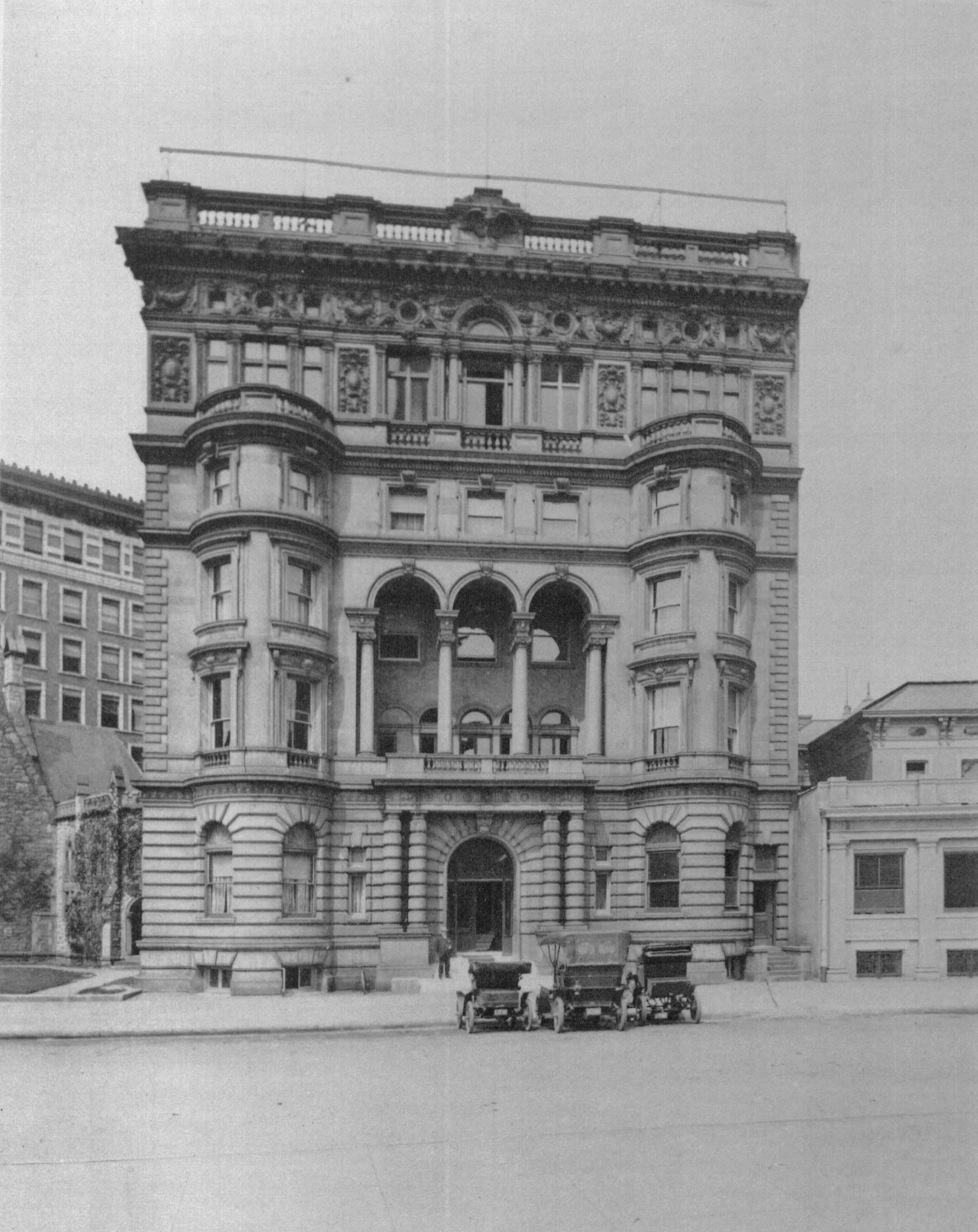
Columbia Club's second home (1900–1923) was razed to allow construction of the current building.

The Columbia Club has had three clubhouses, all in the same spot on Monument Circle. The original clubhouse stood from 1889 to 1898. It was replaced with a five-story building that stood until 1925. That building was replaced with the club's current home, a ten-story structure, designed by local architecture firm Rubush & Hunter. The club razed the 1898 building to accommodate its growing membership and popularity. Robush and Hunter followed guidelines for the new building proposed by fellow architect William Early Russ so that it would complement the Soldiers' and Sailors' Monument. The William P. Jungclaus Company carried out construction for the 1925 building. The Columbia Club was added to the National Register of Historic Places in 1983.

== Architectural features ==
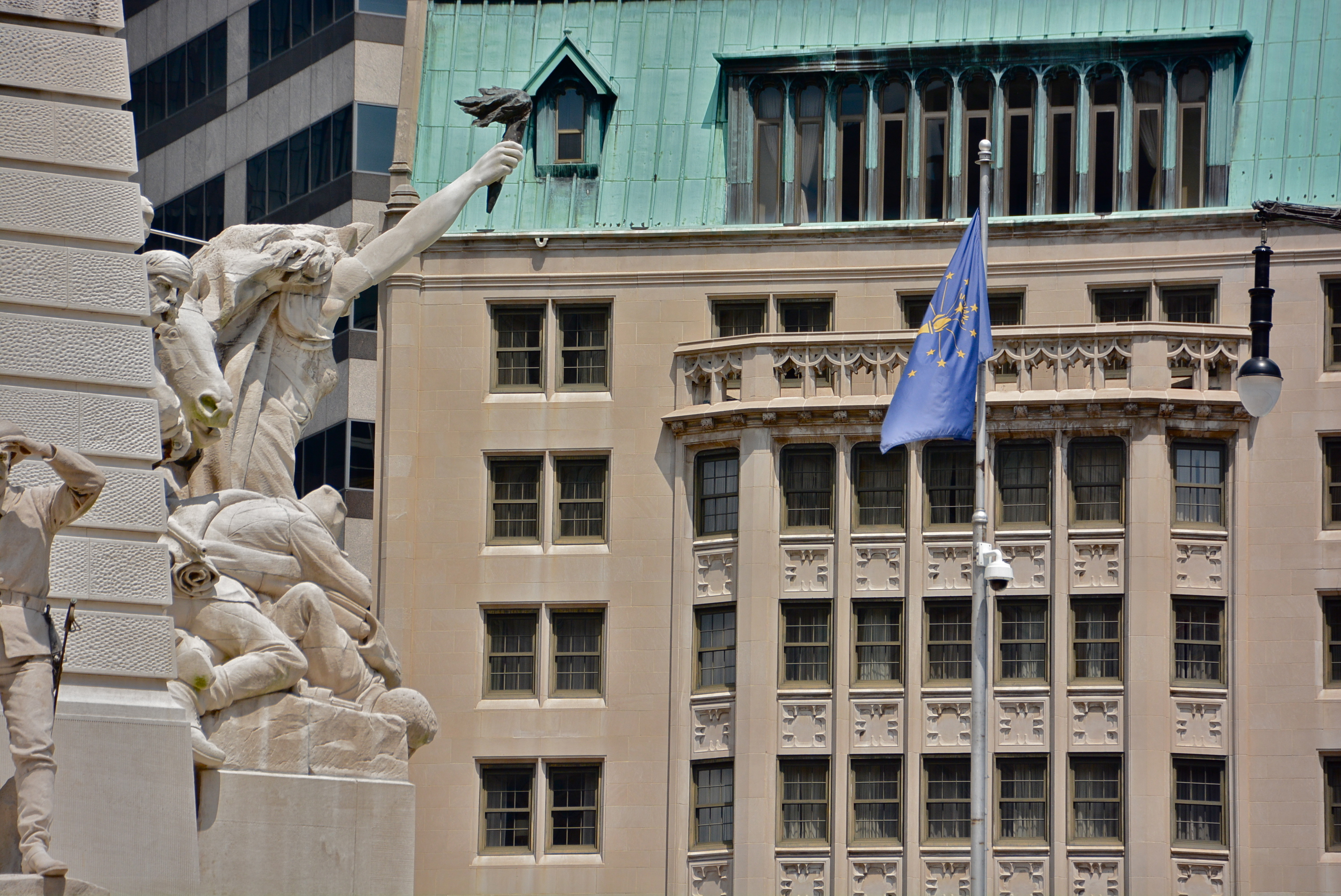
The Columbia Club's oriel window façade in 2015

The Columbia Club showcases many hallmarks of the Gothic Revival style, including a multi-story oriel window, as well as Tudor influences seen in the window arches. The building also features relief panels carved in Indiana Limestone by Alexander Sangernebo, who also created limestone carvings for other historic buildings on Monument Circle.

Inside the Columbia Club are numerous works of Hoosier artists and historic artifacts, including items from the Benjamin Harrison presidential campaign and part of the Lincoln family china collection. After a 2004 acquisition of paintings from a longtime friendly rival, the Indianapolis Athletic Club, the Columbia Club added to its existing collection and now boasts a particularly large gallery of works by members of the Hoosier Group of painters, including T.C. Steele. According to club lore, Steele would at times pay for his membership dues with paintings.

== See also ==
- National Register of Historic Places listings in Center Township, Marion County, Indiana
