= Selig's Dry Goods Company Building =

- U.S. National Register of Historic Places
- U.S. Historic district – Contributing property
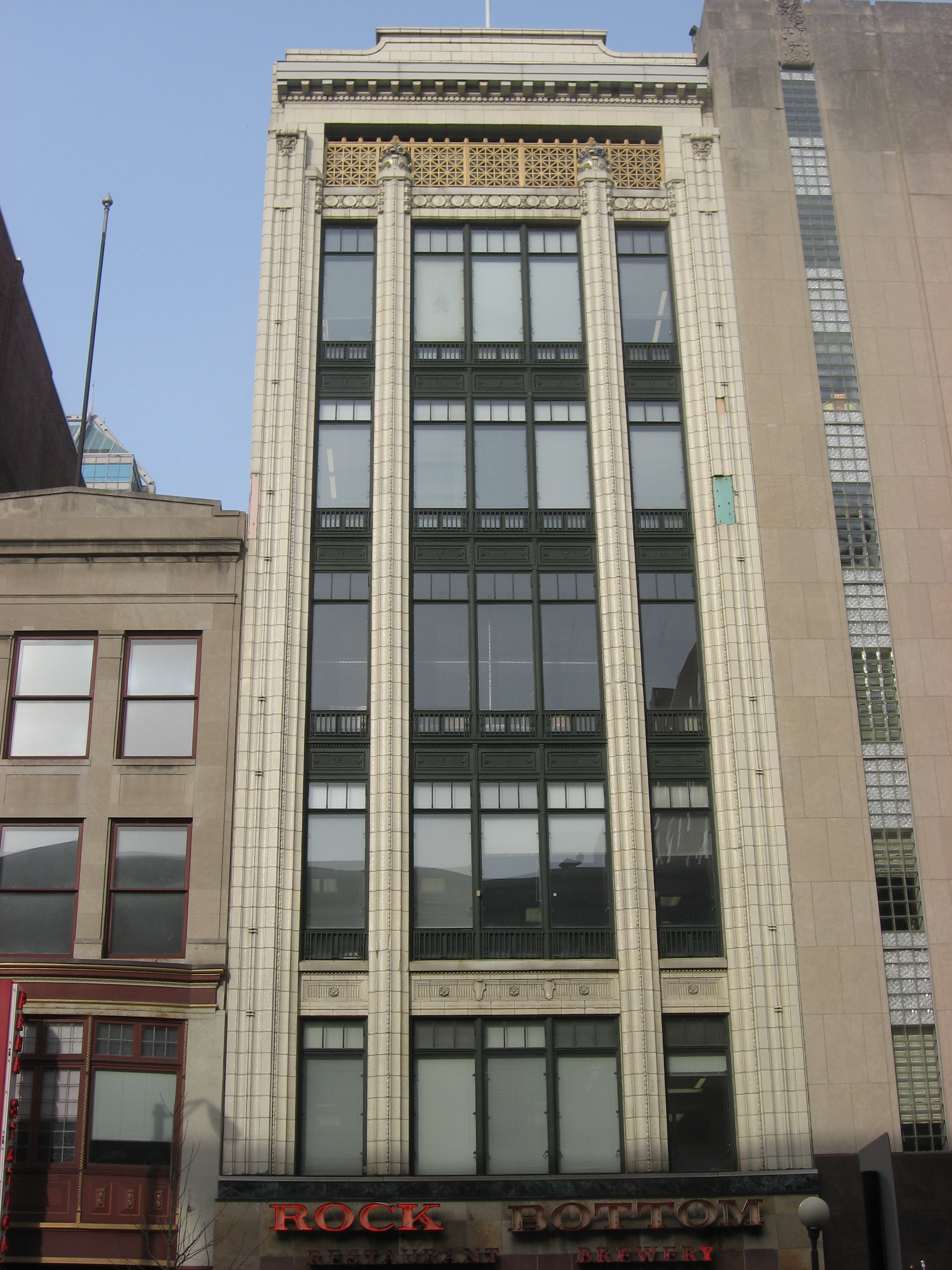
- Selig's Dry Goods Company Building, January 2010

- Location within Indianapolis Location within Indianapolis Location within Indiana Location within the United States
- Location: 20 W. Washington St., Indianapolis, Indiana
- Coordinates: 39°46′2″N 86°9′30″W
- Area: less than one acre
- Built: 1924, 1933
- Architect: Vonnegut, Bohn and Mueller; Elias, Rothschild and Company
- Architectural style: Beaux Arts
- NRHP reference No.: 84001190
- Added to NRHP: May 17, 1984

Selig's Dry Goods Company Building, also known as Morrisons/Em-roe Sporting Goods Company, is a historic commercial building located at Indianapolis, Indiana. It was built in 1924, and is a seven-story, rectangular, Beaux-Arts style building with a white terra cotta and aluminum front facade. It was remodeled in 1933. The building features tinted plate glass windows and a terra cotta Roman thermal window-like screen at the top floor. The building housed the Selig's Dry Goods Company, in operation until 1933.

It was listed on the National Register of Historic Places in 1984. It is located in the Washington Street-Monument Circle Historic District.

== See also ==
- National Register of Historic Places listings in Center Township, Marion County, Indiana
