= Fidelity Trust Building (Indianapolis, Indiana) =

- U.S. National Register of Historic Places
- U.S. Historic district – Contributing property
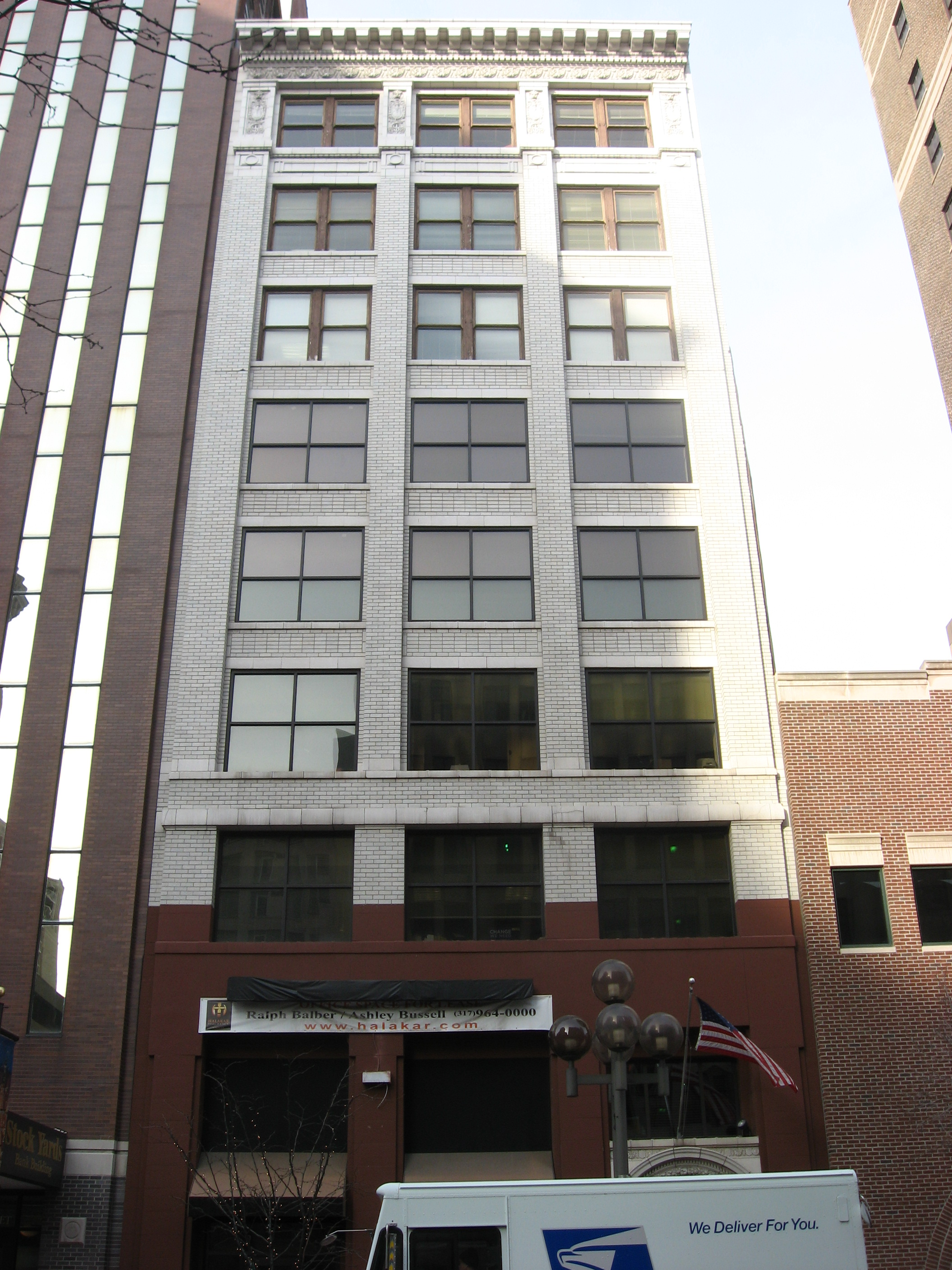
- Fidelity Trust Building, January 2010

- Location within Indianapolis Location within Indianapolis Location within Indiana Location within the United States
- Location: 148 E. Market St., Indianapolis, Indiana
- Coordinates: 39°46′7″N 86°9′17″W
- Area: 0.1 acres (0.040 ha)
- Built: 1914-1915
- Architect: Rubush & Hunter
- Architectural style: Classical Revival
- NRHP reference No.: 80000382
- Added to NRHP: September 27, 1980

Fidelity Trust Building is a historic bank building located in Indianapolis, Indiana. It was built in 1914–1915, and is an eight-story rectangular Classical Revival style building faced in white glazed brick and terra cotta. It measures 39 feet (12 m) wide by 110 feet (34 m) deep. At the time of its listing, the building housed J. Pierpont's Restaurant and Bar.

It was listed on the National Register of Historic Places in 1980. and is located in the Washington Street-Monument Circle Historic District.

== See also ==
- National Register of Historic Places listings in Center Township, Marion County, Indiana
