= Hilbert Circle Theatre =

Historic theater in Indianapolis, Indiana, US

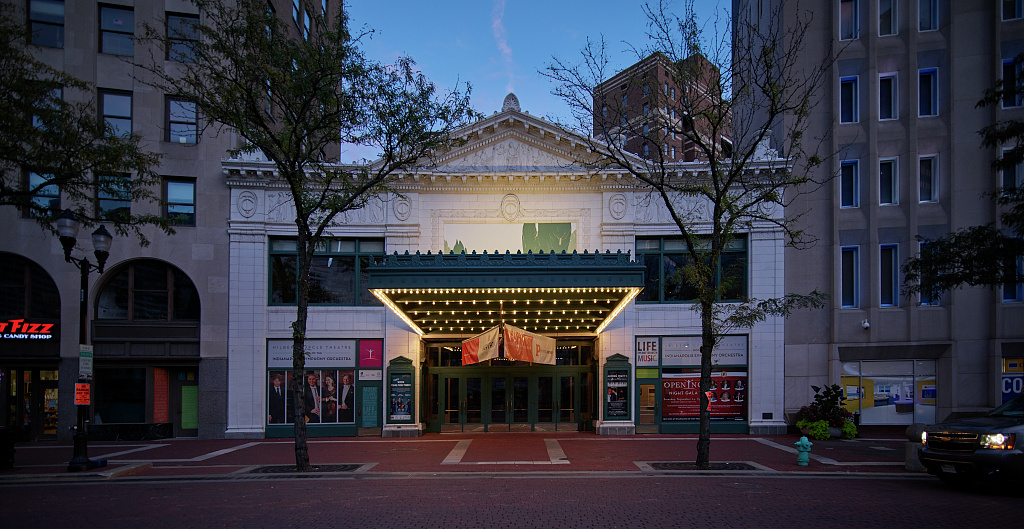
- Entry façade as it appeared in 2016
- Interactive map of Hilbert Circle Theatre
- Former names: Circle Theatre
- Address: 45 Monument Circle
- Location: Indianapolis, Indiana
- Owner: Indianapolis Symphony Orchestra
- Capacity: 1,660
- Type: theatre

Construction
- Opened: August 30, 1916
- Renovated: 1984, 2013

Tenant
- Indianapolis Symphony Orchestra

Website
- www.indianapolissymphony.org
- Circle Theater
- U.S. National Register of Historic Places
- U.S. Historic district – Contributing property
- Location within Indianapolis Location within Indianapolis Location within Indiana Location within the United States
- Coordinates: 39°46′5″N 86°9′26″W
- Area: less than one acre
- Architect: Rubush and Hunter; Bedford Stone Construction Co.
- Architectural style: Classical Revival
- Part of: Washington Street-Monument Circle Historic District (ID97001179)
- NRHP reference No.: 80000058
- Added to NRHP: June 16, 1980

The Hilbert Circle Theatre, originally called the Circle Theatre, is in Indianapolis, Indiana, on Monument Circle in the Washington Street-Monument Circle Historic District. It was originally built in 1916 as a "deluxe movie palace" and now is the home of the Indianapolis Symphony Orchestra.

The theatre was listed on the National Register of Historic Places in 1980.

== History ==
The Circle Theatre was one of the first "motion picture palaces" in the Midwest and one of the first movie theaters west of New York. The theatre also offered locally produced stage shows, such as the 1921 The Landing of the Pilgrims for Thanksgiving week. In 1922, a $50,000 Wurlitzer organ was installed for use during silent films and solo performances. In the summer of 1924, visiting musicians offered Circle patrons "syncopation seasons" with various jazz and popular music performances while the house concert orchestra was off. Frank Sinatra and Dizzy Gillespie were two such visitors who held concerts in the theatre.

On March 6, 1927, the Circle brought sound movies to the Indianapolis approximately fourteen months before other venues. Three musical film segments were shown: Roy Smeck playing the guitar, ukulele, and banjo; Giovanni Martinelli, a Metropolitan Opera tenor, singing I Pagliacci, and finally, Al Jolson, the blackface singing comedian. The Circle brought another first to the city in February 1928 by offering The Jazz Singer, a film with four talking and singing scenes starring Al Jolson.

As multiscreen cinemas emerged in suburban malls throughout the 1960s and 1970s, the Circle Theatre fell into disrepair.

Reopening on October 12, 1984, after a $6.8 million renovation, the Circle Theatre is home to the Indianapolis Symphony Orchestra. In December 1996, it was renamed the Hilbert Circle Theatre after being endowed by Stephen Hilbert, founder of CNO Financial Group, and his wife Tomisue. The theatre holds 1,660 seats and has space for an 87-member ensemble. It is now home to a 3-manual 24-rank Wurlitzer theatre organ.

== Architecture ==
The theatre was designed by Indianapolis architects Rubus & Hunter. Built in 1916, the building is a Neoclassical-revival with white glazed terra cotta entrance section with a brick auditorium section behind. The front façade is slightly curved. The theatre's interior was designed in the style of architect Robert Adam and uses motifs from Greek, Etruscan and Pompeian artists.

== Notable events ==
In 1986, the theatre reverted to being a movie palace for the world premier of Hoosiers. The theatre hosted the Weightlifting Competition during the 1987 Pan American Games. Actress Kitty Carlisle hosted a centennial celebration for the Indiana native composer Cole Porter in 1991. The venue later hosted NBC's Late Night with Jimmy Fallon for a week of episodes during Super Bowl XLVI in 2012.

== See also ==
- Indianapolis Historic Preservation Commission
- List of attractions and events in Indianapolis
- National Register of Historic Places listings in Center Township, Marion County, Indiana
