= Marott's Shoes Building =

- U.S. National Register of Historic Places
- U.S. Historic district – Contributing property
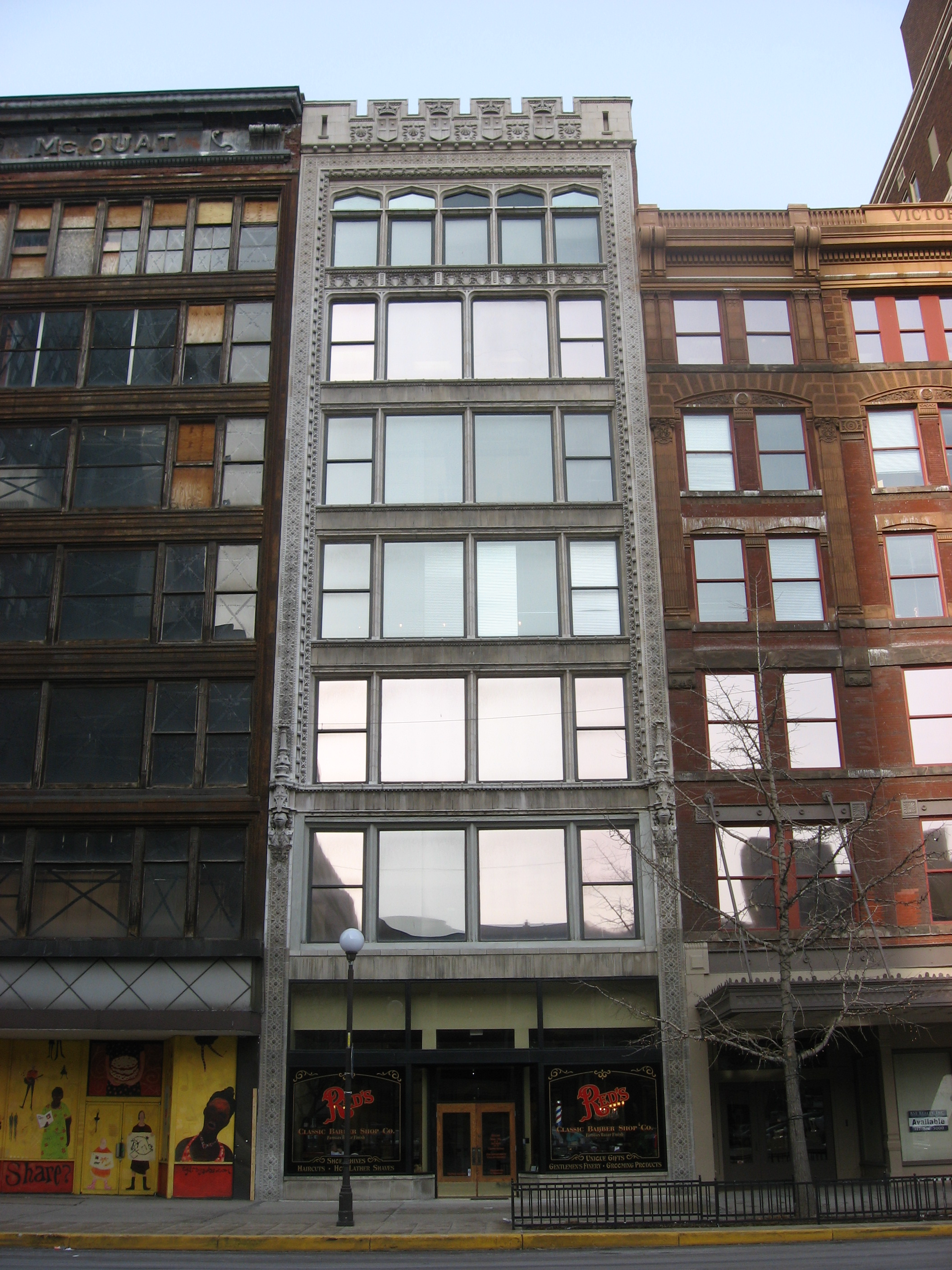
- Marott's Shoes Building, January 2010

- Location within Indianapolis Location within Indianapolis Location within Indiana Location within the United States
- Location: 18-20 E. Washington St., Indianapolis, Indiana
- Coordinates: 39°46′3″N 86°9′27″W
- Area: less than one acre
- Built: 1899-1900
- Architectural style: Chicago, Tudor Revival
- NRHP reference No.: 83000135
- Added to NRHP: May 9, 1983

Marott's Shoes Building is a historic commercial building located at Indianapolis, Indiana. It was built in 1899–1900, and is a seven-story, four-bay, rectangular, Tudor Revival style building faced in white terra cotta. It has large Chicago style window openings on the upper floors. It features Tudor arched windows on the top floor and a crenellated parapet. It is located next to the Lombard Building.

It was listed on the National Register of Historic Places in 1983. It is located in the Washington Street-Monument Circle Historic District.

== See also ==
- National Register of Historic Places listings in Center Township, Marion County, Indiana
