= Washington Street–Monument Circle Historic District =

Historic district in Indianapolis, Indiana, US

- U.S. National Register of Historic Places
- U.S. Historic district
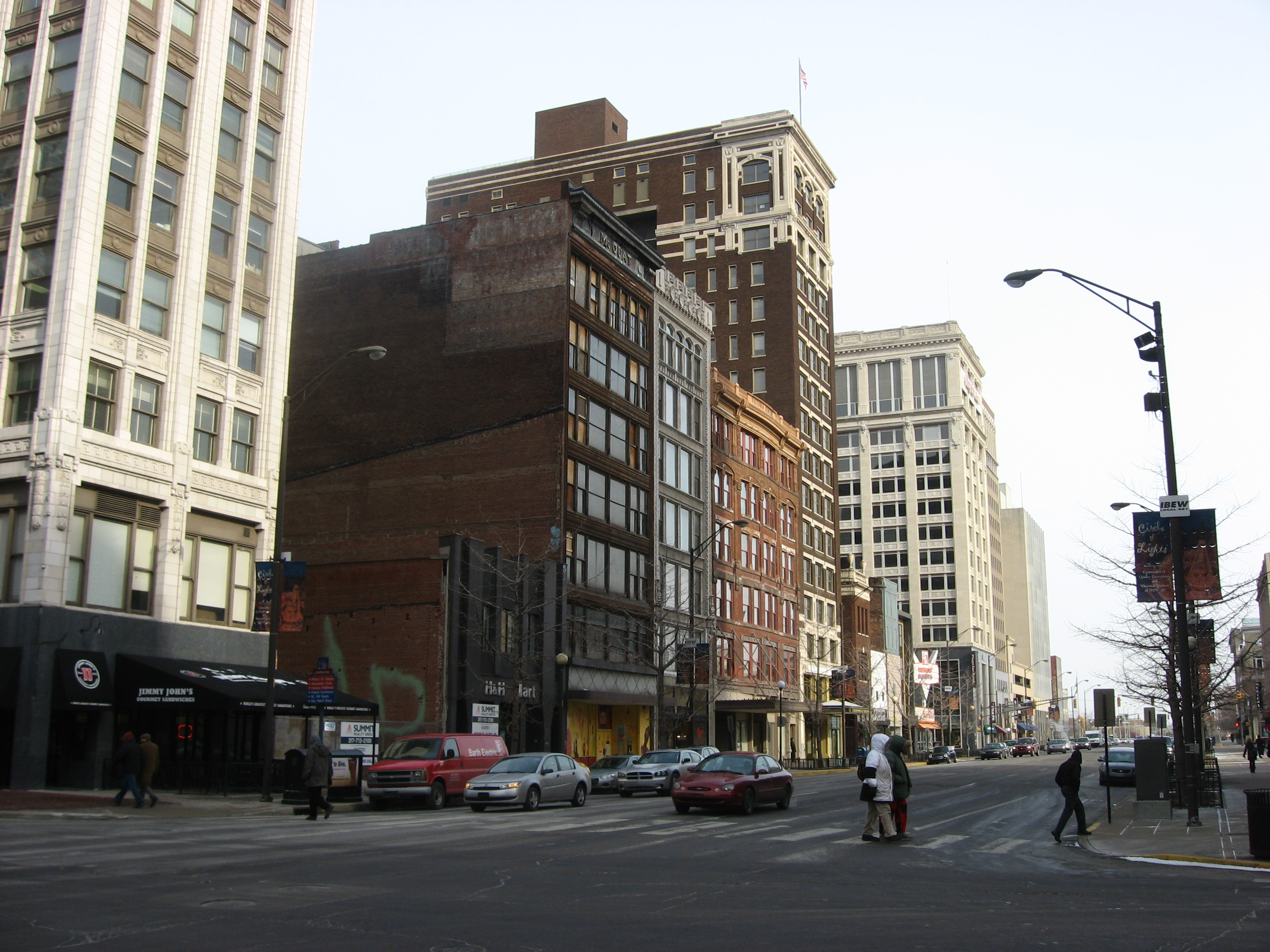
- Washington Street in downtown Indianapolis, January 2010

- Location within Indiana Location within the United States
- Location: Roughly bounded by Delaware, Ohio, Capitol, and W. Maryland Sts., Indianapolis, Indiana
- Coordinates: 39°46′04″N 86°09′29″W
- Area: 31.1 acres (12.6 ha)
- Built: 1852
- Architects: Rubush & Hunter; Vonnegut & Bohn
- Architectural style: Mid 19th Century Revival, Late Victorian, Late 19th And Early 20th Century American Movements
- NRHP reference No.: 97001179
- Added to NRHP: September 26, 1997

Washington Street–Monument Circle Historic District is a national historic district located at Indianapolis, Indiana, United States, covering the first two blocks of East and West Washington and Market streets, the south side of the 100 block of East Ohio Street, Monument Circle, the first block of North and South Meridian Street, the first two blocks of North Pennsylvania Street, the west side of the first two blocks of North Delaware Street, the east side of the first block of North Capitol Avenue, and the first block of North Illinois Street. In total, the district encompasses 40 contributing buildings and 2 contributing structures in the central business district of Indianapolis centered on Monument Circle. It developed between about 1852 and 1946, and includes representative examples of Italianate, Greek Revival, and Art Deco style architecture.

It was listed on the National Register of Historic Places in 1997.

== Buildings ==
Nineteen of the 40 contributing buildings are individually listed on the National Register of Historic Places:

- Christ Church Cathedral at 125 Monument Circle
- Circle Theatre (now known as the Hilbert Circle Theatre) at 45 Monument Circle
- The Columbia Club at 121 Monument Circle
- Delaware Flats at 120-128 North Delaware Street
- Elliott's Block (now known as the L.S. Ayres Annex Warehouse) at 14-22 West Maryland Street
- Fidelity Trust Building at 148 East Market
- Hotel Washington at 32 East Washington Street
- Indiana Theatre at 124 West Washington Street
- Indianapolis News Building at 30 West Washington Street
- Kahn Tailoring Company Building at 800 North Capitol Avenue
- Lombard Building at 22-28 East Washington Street
- Marrott's Shoes Building at 18-20 East Washington Street
- Merchants National Bank (now known as the Barnes and Thornburg Building) at 11 South Meridian Street
- Merchants National Bank Annex at 7 East Washington Street
- Rink's Womens Apparel Store at 29 North Illinois Street
- Selig's Dry Goods Company Building at 20 West Washington Street
- Soldiers' and Sailors' Monument at Monument Circle
- Taylor Carpet Company Building at 26 West Washington Street
- Test Building at 54 Monument Circle

Other notable buildings within the district include the L. S. Ayres & Co. department store (1905, major additions 1914, 1926, 1946), the Hannaman and Duzan Building (1852), the Odd Fellows Building (1907–1908), Hotel Harrison (1927–1928), the Guaranty Building (1922–1923), Circle Tower (1929–1930), the Consolidated Building (1909), and the Turner Building and Savings Association (1941).

== Events ==
Crispus Attucks High School basketball team

On March 19, 1955, the Crispus Attucks High School basketball team won the IHSAA state championship and became the first all-black school in the nation to win a state title. As was traditional for the IHSAA champions, the Attucks team participated in their parade. Although it wound around Monument Circle, their bus did not stop at the circle as previous parades for white championship teams had. Instead, the parade continued on to Northwestern Park. When the team won their second consecutive championship in 1956, the parade again skipped Monument Circle.

On May 23, 2015, nine members of the 1955 Crispus Attucks High School basketball team served as grand marshals for the 2015 IPL 500 Festival Parade and made their trip through Monument Circle. These members included Oscar Robertson, Lavern Benson, James Enoch, John Gipson, Bill Hampton, Albert Maxey, Willie Merriweather, Shedrick Mitchell and Henry Robertson.

Indiana Pride

In 1984, hundreds of LGBTQ+ Hoosiers gathered at Monument Circle, marking the first large public gathering for Indiana Pride. Previously, Pride Week had been celebrated through brunches at the Essex Hotel House, fundraising for various causes, and food donations for the poor. After several years of private celebrations, LGBTQ+ Hoosiers again gathered at the circle in 1990. In 2021, the Indiana Historical Bureau and Indy Pride installed the "Origins of Indiana Pride - Indiana LGBTQ Pride" historical marker at 40 Monument Circle to commemorate the 1990 "Celebration on the Circle."

== See also ==
- National Register of Historic Places listings in Center Township, Marion County, Indiana
