= Indianapolis News Building =

- U.S. National Register of Historic Places
- U.S. Historic district – Contributing property
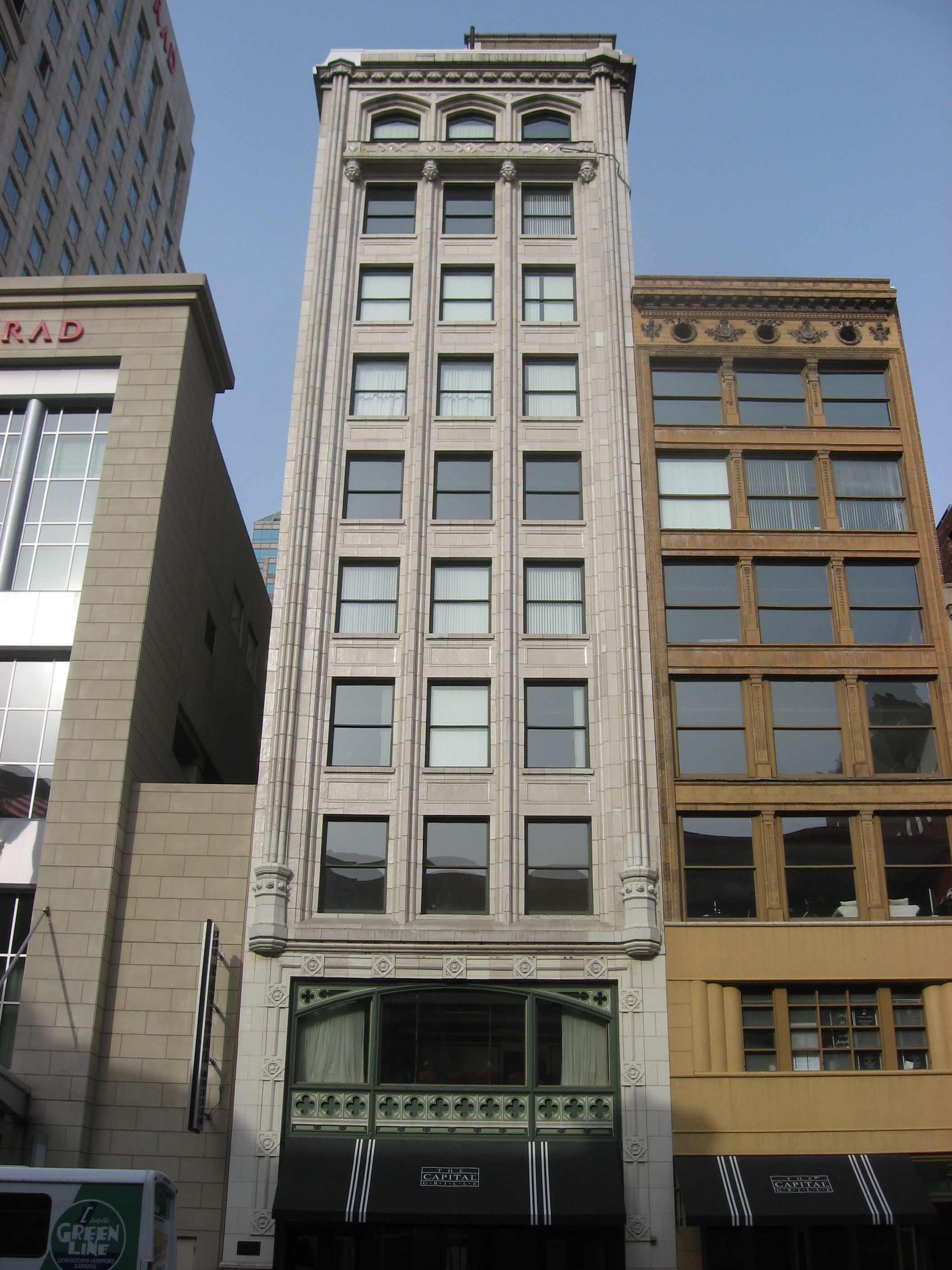
- Indianapolis News Building, January 2010

- Location within Indianapolis Location within Indianapolis Location within Indiana Location within the United States
- Location: 30 W. Washington St., Indianapolis, Indiana
- Coordinates: 39°46′2″N 86°9′33″W
- Area: less than one acre
- Built: 1909–1910
- Built by: Bedford Stone & Construction Co.
- Architect: Hunt, Jarvis
- Architectural style: Neo-Gothic
- NRHP reference No.: 84001133
- Added to NRHP: March 7, 1984

Indianapolis News Building, also known as the Goodman Jewelers Building, is a historic commercial building located at Indianapolis, Indiana. It was designed by architect Jarvis Hunt (1863–1941) and built in 1909–1910. It is a ten-story, rectangular, Neo-Gothic style brick and terra cotta building. It is three bays wide and 10 bays deep. The top floor features a corbelled terra cotta balcony, Tudor-like window openings, and a Gothic parapet. It is located next to the Taylor Carpet Company Building. The building housed the Indianapolis News until 1949.

It was listed on the National Register of Historic Places in 1984. It is located in the Washington Street–Monument Circle Historic District.

== See also ==
- National Register of Historic Places listings in Center Township, Marion County, Indiana
