= Taylor Carpet Company Building =

- U.S. National Register of Historic Places
- U.S. Historic district – Contributing property
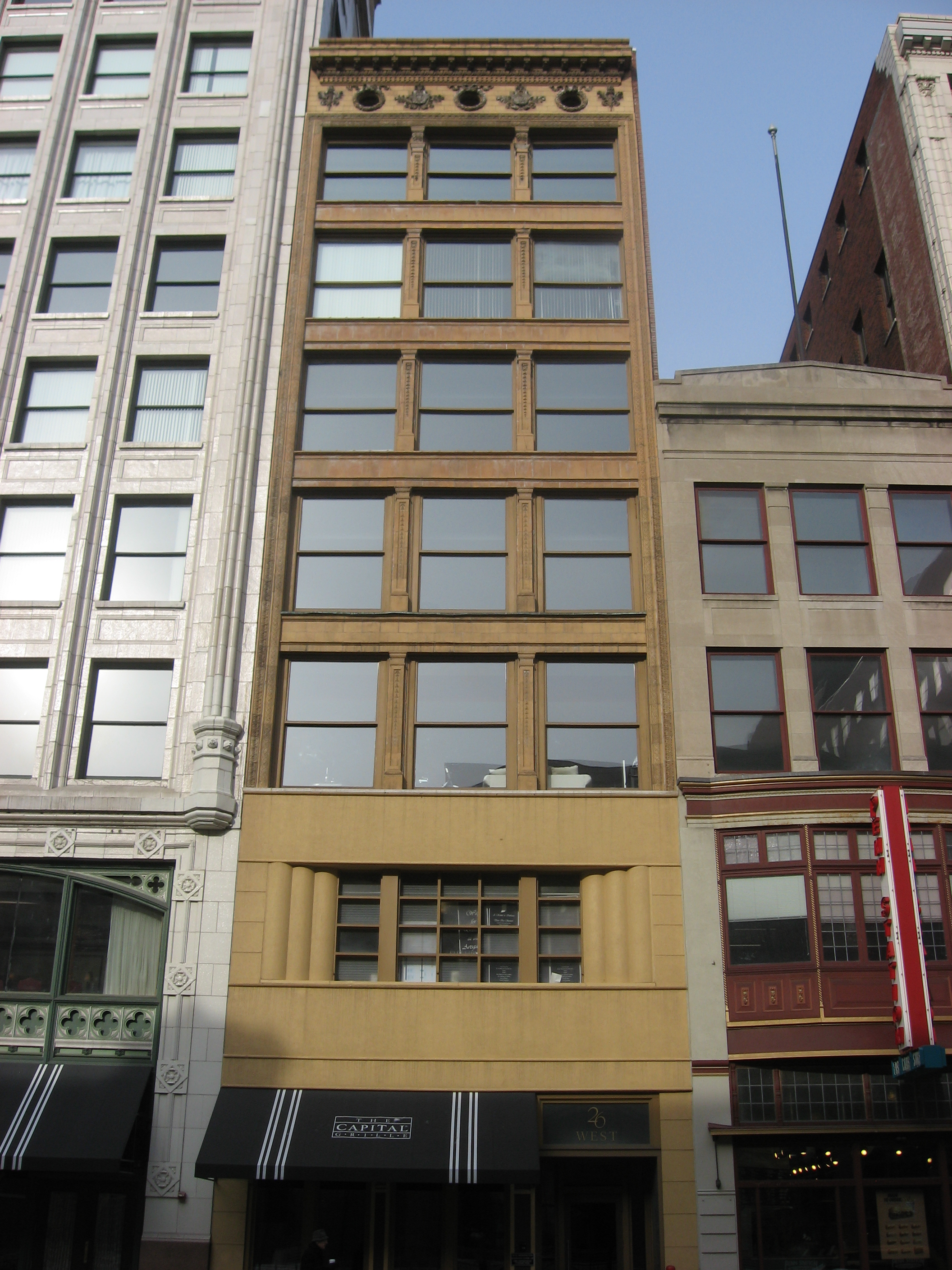
- Taylor Carpet Company Building, January 2010

- Location within Indianapolis Location within Indianapolis Location within Indiana Location within the United States
- Location: 26 W. Washington St., Indianapolis, Indiana
- Coordinates: 39°46′2″N 86°9′32″W
- Area: less than one acre
- Built: 1897, 1906
- Architectural style: Chicago, Beaux Arts, Art Moderne
- NRHP reference No.: 84001192
- Added to NRHP: March 1, 1984

Taylor Carpet Company Building is a historic commercial building located at Indianapolis, Indiana. It was built in 1897, and is a seven-story, rectangular, Beaux-Arts style building. The top three stories were added in 1906. The front facade is faced with buff terra cotta and the upper stories feature large Chicago style window openings. The first two floors are faced with an Art Moderne style stone veneer. It is located next to the Indianapolis News Building. The building housed the Taylor Carpet Company, in operation until 1936.

It was listed on the National Register of Historic Places in 1984. It is located in the Washington Street-Monument Circle Historic District.

== See also ==
- National Register of Historic Places listings in Center Township, Marion County, Indiana
