= Meridian Street (Indianapolis) =

Primary north–south street in Indianapolis, Indiana, US

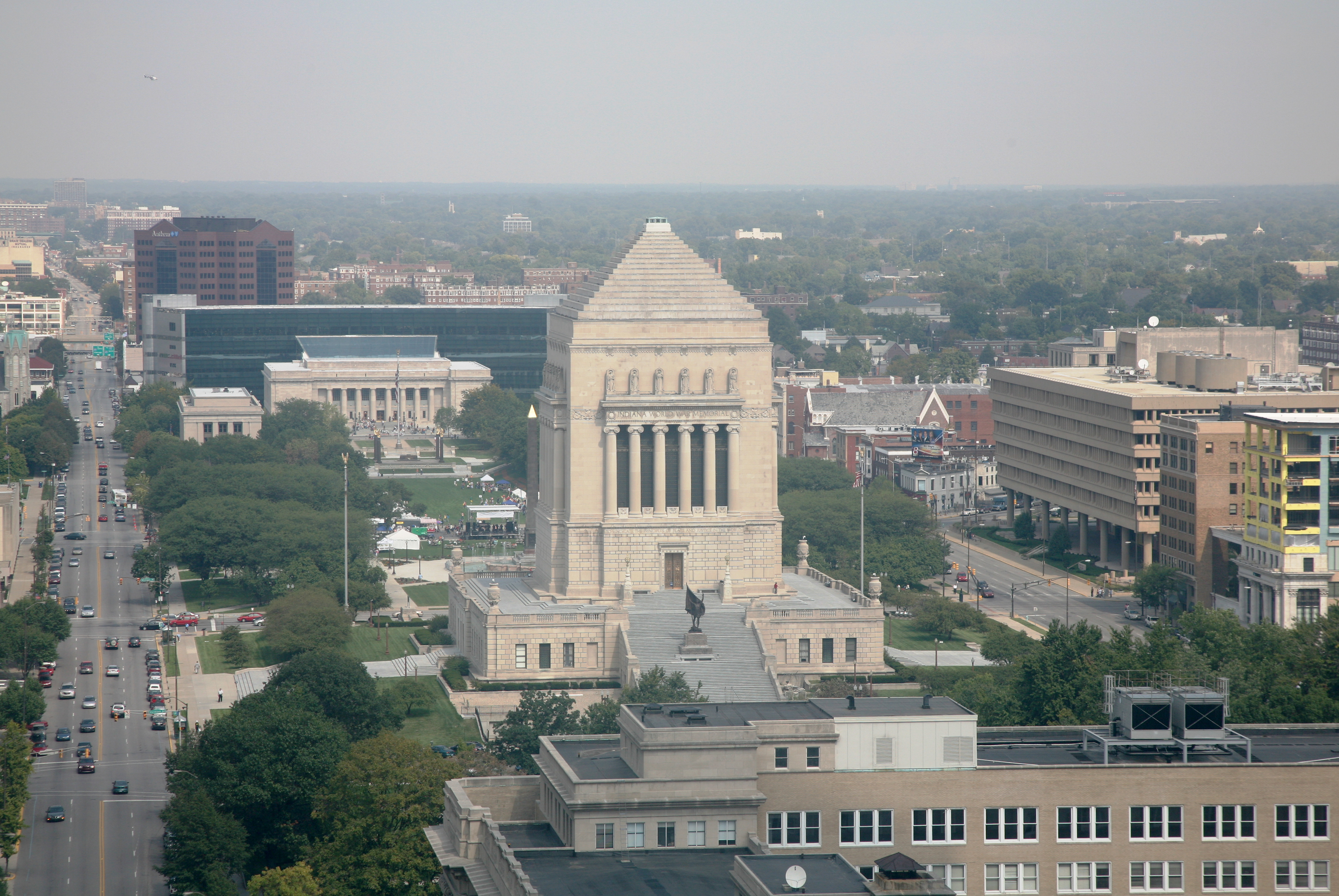
- North Meridian Street (left) as seen from the Soldiers' and Sailors' Monument observation deck
- Owner: City of Indianapolis; State of Indiana (southern section)
- Location: Indianapolis, Indiana, U.S.
- South end: County Line Road
- North end: 96th Street

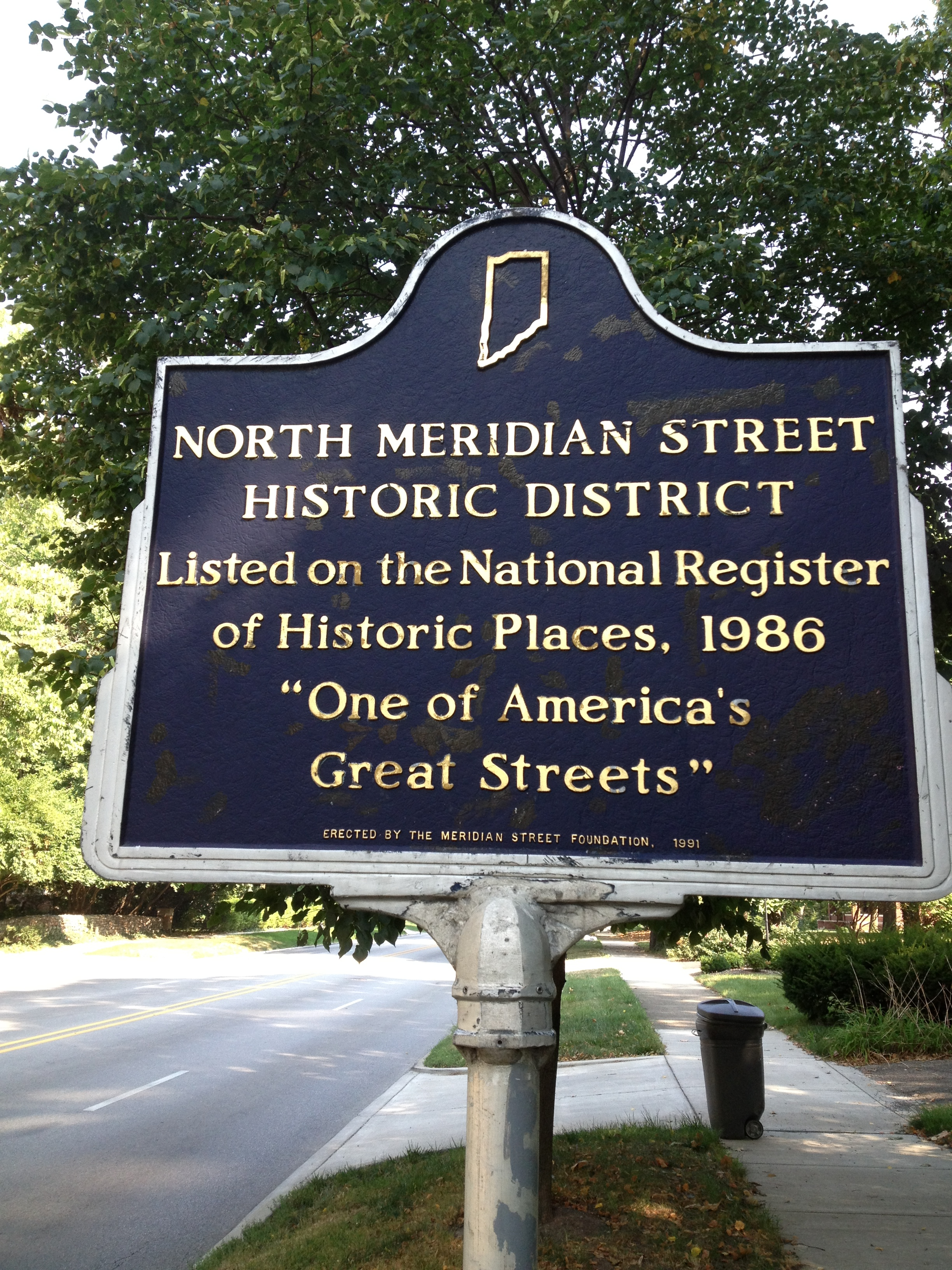
North Meridian Street Historic District marker

Meridian Street is the primary north–south street in Indianapolis, Indiana, United States. The corridor continues north as US 31 and south as Indiana State Road 135.

As its name implies, the street serves as Indianapolis's principal meridian, forming the origin of the city's east–west address numbering system. It intersects Washington Street, the baseline for north–south address numbering, immediately south of Monument Circle.

North of downtown, Meridian continues through several prominent city neighborhoods, like the Old Northside, Herron-Morton, Butler–Tarkington, Meridian–Kessler, and Arden, and the towns of Meridian Hills and Williams Creek.

Meridian Street also passes through several historic districts: the North Meridian Street Historic District, the Old Northside Historic District, the Shortridge–Meridian Street Apartments Historic District, the Washington Street–Monument Circle Historic District, and the Indianapolis Union Station-Wholesale District.

In 1919, property owners on Meridian Street from Monument Circle to the Central Canal proposed converting the street into a boulevard and putting it under the jurisdiction of the parks board to preserve its residential character. However, the increased demand for commercial property for an expanding downtown led to the proposal being defeated as property owners in the southern portion of the proposed boulevard sold their property to business interests. Nevertheless, in the early 1920s the portion of the street from Fall Creek to the canal was transferred to the parks board and a 25-foot (7.6 m) setback for new construction was imposed. In conjunction with the original proposal, an unsuccessful attempt was made to change the name of the street to Lincoln Boulevard in order to honor Abraham Lincoln in the same way that Washington Street honored George Washington.

North of 40th Street to 57th Street, Meridian Street is considered to be among the most prestigious residential streets in Indiana. Some of the most impressive residential architecture in the United States can be found here, in a variety of architectural styles. The current Governor's Mansion can be found here, as well as the house that served as Governor's Mansion prior to the current house. In 2017, the historic district was among the most affluent urban neighborhoods in the United States, with a mean household income of US$102,599.

== Notable addresses ==
- Balmoral Court
- Barnes and Thornburg Building
- Birch Bayh Federal Building and United States Courthouse
- The Blacherne
- The Buckingham
- Central Library
- The Children's Museum of Indianapolis
- Coulter Flats
- George Stumpf House
- Indiana Governor's Residence
- Indiana World War Memorial Plaza
- IU Health North Medical Center
- Ivy Tech Community College of Indiana
- Joseph J. Cole Jr. House
- Marott Hotel
- Meridian Street United Methodist Church
- Monument Circle
- Morrison Block
- Saint James Court Apartments
- Saints Peter and Paul Cathedral
- Salesforce Tower
- Schnull–Rauch House
- Scottish Rite Cathedral
- Second Presbyterian Church
- Shortridge High School
- Slippery Noodle Inn
- Spink Arms Hotel
- H. P. Wasson & Company Building
- William N. Thompson House

== See also ==
- Transportation in Indianapolis
