= George Stumpf House =

Historic house in Indiana, United States

- U.S. National Register of Historic Places
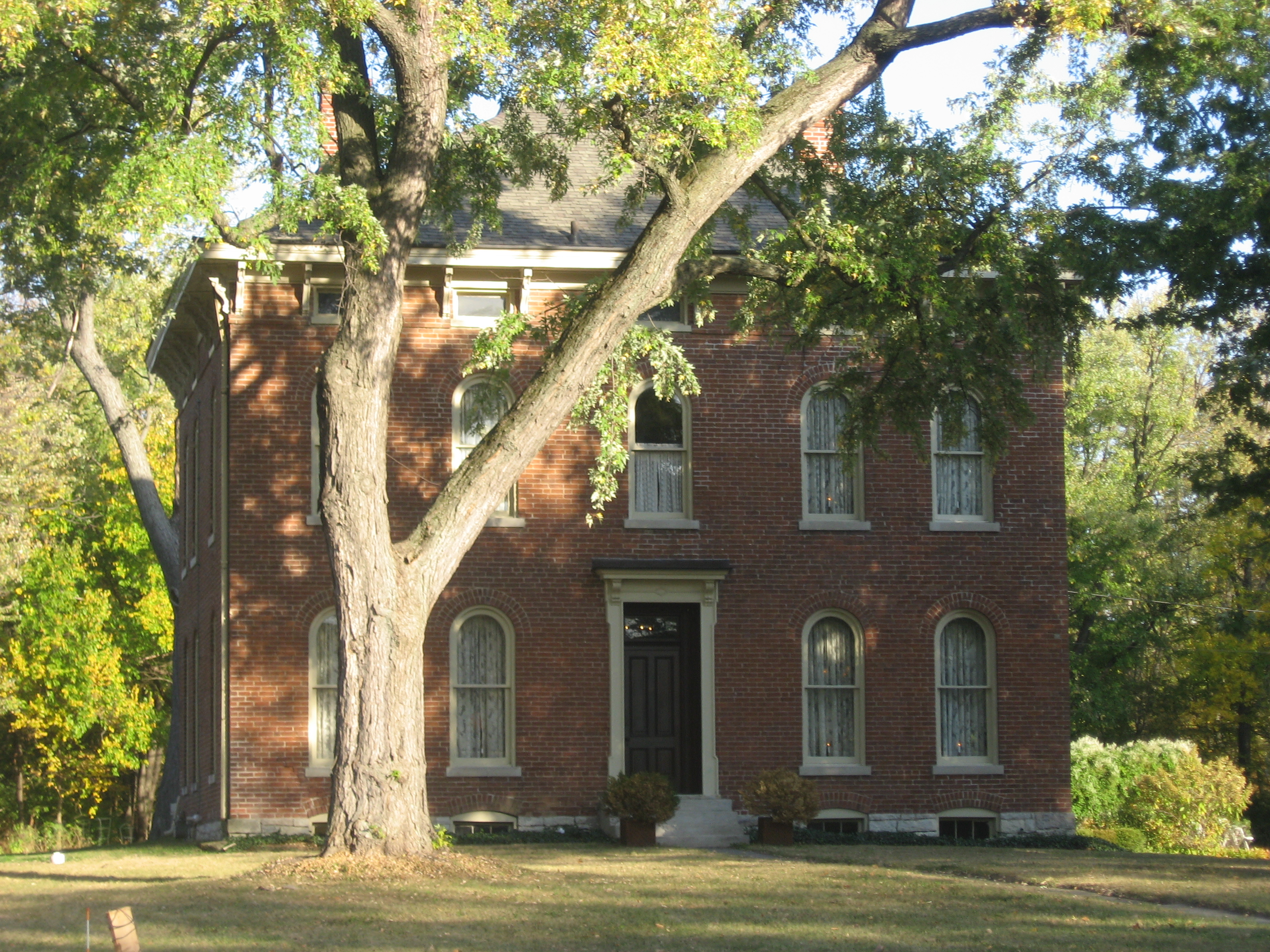
- Front of the house

- Location within Indianapolis Location within Indiana Location within the United States
- Location: 3225 S. Meridian St., Indianapolis, Indiana
- Coordinates: 39°43′6″N 86°9′29″W
- Area: Less than 1 acre (0.40 ha)
- Built: 1870
- Architectural style: Italianate
- NRHP reference No.: 79000039
- Added to NRHP: May 14, 1979

The George Stumpf House is a historic residence in Indianapolis, Indiana, United States. Located along Meridian Street on the southern side of the city, it was started in 1870 and completed in 1872.

== History ==
The house was built as the residence of George Stumpf, a native of Bavaria who moved to Indiana with his family in 1838. A craftsman, Stumpf was both a blacksmith and a manufacturer of wagons for much of his working life. As he grew older, his eyes became damaged by the strain of smithing, so he and his wife Elizabeth purchased property on South Meridian Street in northern Perry Township, which was then known as Three Notch Road. Here they built a log cabin and began farming; as they prospered, they prepared to erect a brick house, but construction was delayed nearly ten years by the American Civil War.

Stumpf and his wife were active in local society: they were members of Zion Evangelical Protestant Church in Indianapolis, and they participated in the establishment of the General German Protestant Orphans Home. They were the parents of eight children; after the deaths of their parents, the land was divided among all the children, with the house passing into the possession of George Stumpf II. He departed from his father's career, embarking on the manufacturing of sausages; after his death, the house was owned by three successive generations of his descendants.

== Architecture ==
The Stumpf House is a symmetrical two-story brick structure with a foundation of fieldstone; except for a small addition to the rear that consists of a porch and kitchen, it is rectangular in layout. Inside, the two floors have similar plans: a center hallway with a stairway is surrounded by four rooms of equal sizes. An attic sits above the upper story. In its early years, the house was one of two buildings on the property: a small summer house was erected behind the main residence for the use of the farm's employees.

George Stumpf chose an elaborate form of the Italianate style of architecture for his home. Aside from the increased height needed by its unusually high attic, the house is a textbook example of the style: it features wide eaves with large wooden brackets, a hip roof, corbelling below the attic, and rounded arch windows. Measuring five bays wide, the facade includes shorter attic windows, a recessed entrance with a heavy wooden front door, and two large chimneys. Virtually none of the house has seen significant modifications, except for the small addition on the rear: this has seen the replacement of its original gable window, the addition of casement and aluminum storm windows to the kitchen, and the enclosure of the porch. Although the house's interior deteriorated over the twentieth century, it remained one of the area's best Italianate structures. It includes many design features common to large Italianate houses in Indiana, such as the symmetrical floor plan with a five-bay facade.

== Recognition ==
In 1979, the Stumpf House was listed on the National Register of Historic Places, qualifying because of its historically significant architecture. It is one of five National Register-listed locations in Perry Township, along with the main administration building of the University of Indianapolis, the Hanna-Ochler-Elder House, the Homecroft Historic District, and the Old Southport High School.
