= Washington Park Historic District (Indianapolis, Indiana) =

Historic district in Indiana, United States

- U.S. National Register of Historic Places
- U.S. Historic district
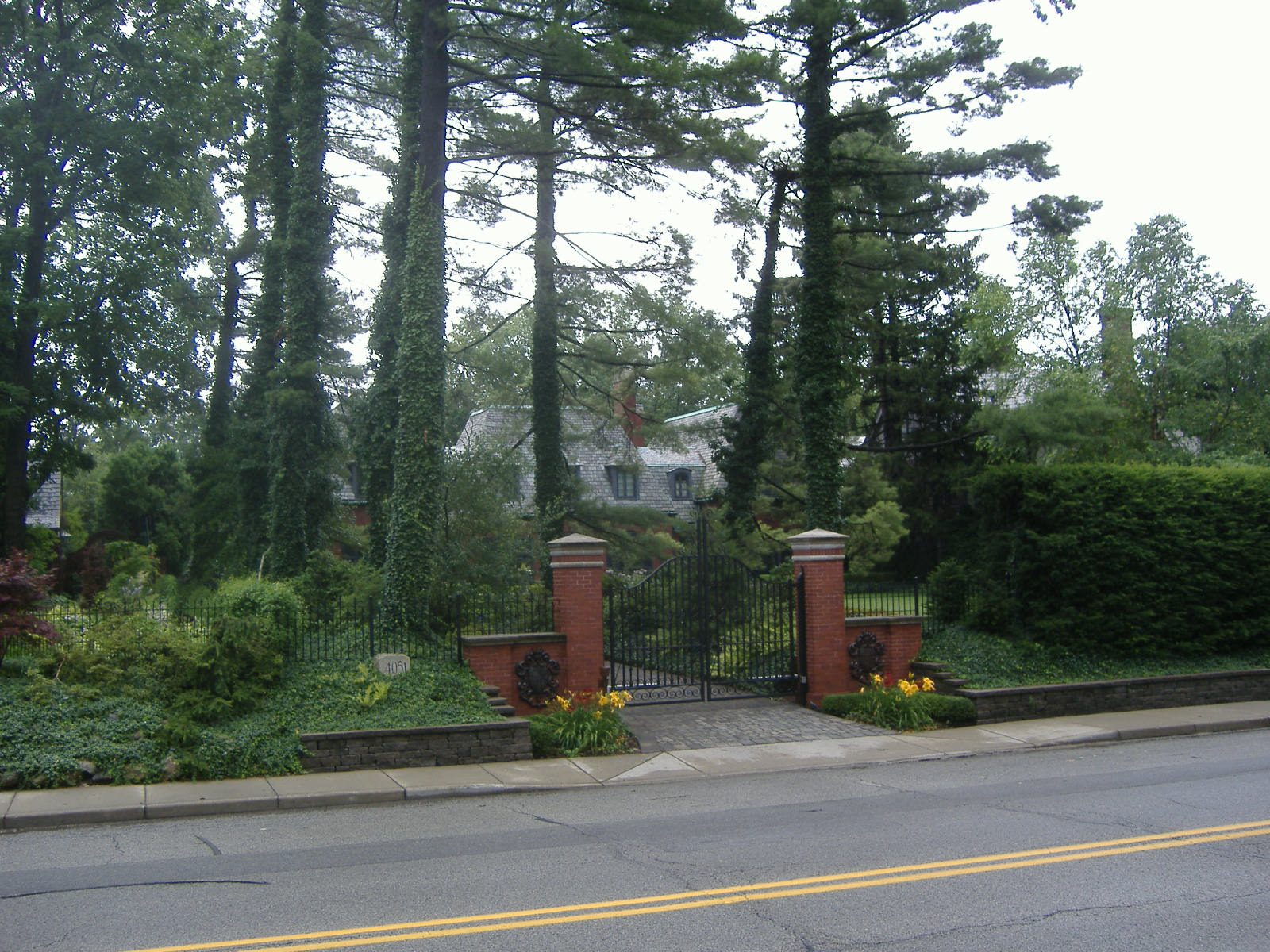
- Faux Château de Malmaison within the district

- Location within Indianapolis Location within Indiana Location within the United States
- Location: Bounded by Pennsylvania Street and Central Avenue between 40th and 43rd Streets in Indianapolis, Indiana
- Coordinates: 39°49′51″N 86°09′08″W
- Area: 60 acres (24 ha)
- Architect: Hunter, Frank; et al.
- Architectural style: Late 19th And 20th Century Revivals, Bungalow/craftsman
- NRHP reference No.: 08000565
- Added to NRHP: June 24, 2008

The Washington Park Historic District is a national historic district located in Indianapolis, Indiana. It was listed on the National Register of Historic Places on June 24, 2008. It comprises nearly 60 acres (240,000 m^{2}) and is located 4 miles (6.4 km) north of downtown Indianapolis, in the south-central part of the Meridian-Kessler neighborhood. The district includes all properties south of 43rd Street and north of 40th Street, and west of Central Avenue and east of the alley running north and south between Pennsylvania and Meridian Streets; Washington Boulevard runs north–south through the center of the district. It includes 110 contributing buildings, ranging mostly from mansions to small bungalows, and three non-contributing buildings.

Washington Park was annexed by the city of Indianapolis in 1906. The streets would not be paved until November 1916, with 43rd Street not having sidewalks and pavement until 1923. The apartments in the district, built in the 1920s and 1930, attracted young professionals who not only liked the neighborhood, but saw it as "prestigious".

The buildings in the district are a church (the former Holy Trinity Hellenic Greek Orthodox Church), two duplexes, a four-unit apartment building, eight doubles, 101 single houses, most of which were built before World War II, and two non-contributing (historically) brick houses built in 1986 and 1987 that do not contrast with the other buildings. Many of the contributing buildings are of different Revival architectural styles, particularly from Europe: Classical, Colonial Revival, Italian Renaissance, and Tudor Revival.

Of particular note is the Harry Hartley house, which was based on Château de Malmaison, a residence of Napoleon Bonaparte. Harry Hartley sent architect William Earl Russ to the original in France to replicate the French chalet in a smaller form, in effect creating a Napoleon complex in Indianapolis.

Another prominent building is the home of United States Senator Albert J. Beveridge. It was here that he wrote his biography of John Marshall, Chief Justice of the United States Supreme Court, which won a Pulitzer Prize.

== See also ==
- National Register of Historic Places listings in Marion County, Indiana
