= Holy Trinity Greek Orthodox Church (Carmel, Indiana) =

Greek Orthodox church in Central Indiana

Coordinates: 39°56′30.7″N 86°13′12.8″W

- 2018 Greek Fest at Holy Trinity Greek Orthodox Church
- Interactive map of Holy Trinity Greek Orthodox Church
- Location: 3500 W 106th St; Carmel, Indiana 46032

History
- Formed: 450 West Ohio Street
- Founded: 1910

The Holy Trinity Greek Orthodox Church is a Greek Orthodox church in Carmel, Indiana, United States. It was incorporated in 1910 in Marion County, Indiana (Indianapolis).

The Cathedral stayed at its original location until 1959 before moving locations. As the church grew through the years, larger buildings were built and purchased in Indianapolis.

== History ==
The church was attended by Greek immigrants in the early 20th century and previously. In 1910, it was given its official name and charter with Indiana's Secretary of State. Until 1919, the church was located at 450 West Ohio Street. From 1919 to 1959, it was located at a larger building at 231 North West Street.

A new location in Indianapolis opened in 1960, on 4011 North Pennsylvania. This location was turned into the Basile Opera Center after the church moved locations, hosting the Indianapolis Opera.

A plaque was erected at the original church location at 450 West Ohio St in 2003 by the Indiana Historical Bureau. The plaque is nearby the Indiana Historical Society and describes the original location and cultural significance. It was replaced with a newer version in 2020.

The church was moved from Indianapolis proper to Carmel in 2008, opening officially on Christmas Eve. The Carmel church is described as a Byzantine structure, having begun construction in 2006 by the Shiel Sexton construction company.

In 2018, Greek artist George Kordis was hired to add art with biblical themes and traditional iconography to the inside of the church. Also in 2018, the church was elevated to a cathedral, the only Greek Orthodox parish currently in Indianapolis.

The church now functions as a religious site that preserves Greek customs and culture. It hosts Indiana's "Greek Fest", which is a festival that takes place at the church in late August, generally the second to last Friday and Saturday. The first "Greek Fest" took place in the year 1973.
