= Joseph J. Cole Jr. House and 1925 Cole Brouette No. 70611 =

Historic house in Indiana, United States

- U.S. National Register of Historic Places
- U.S. Historic district – Contributing property
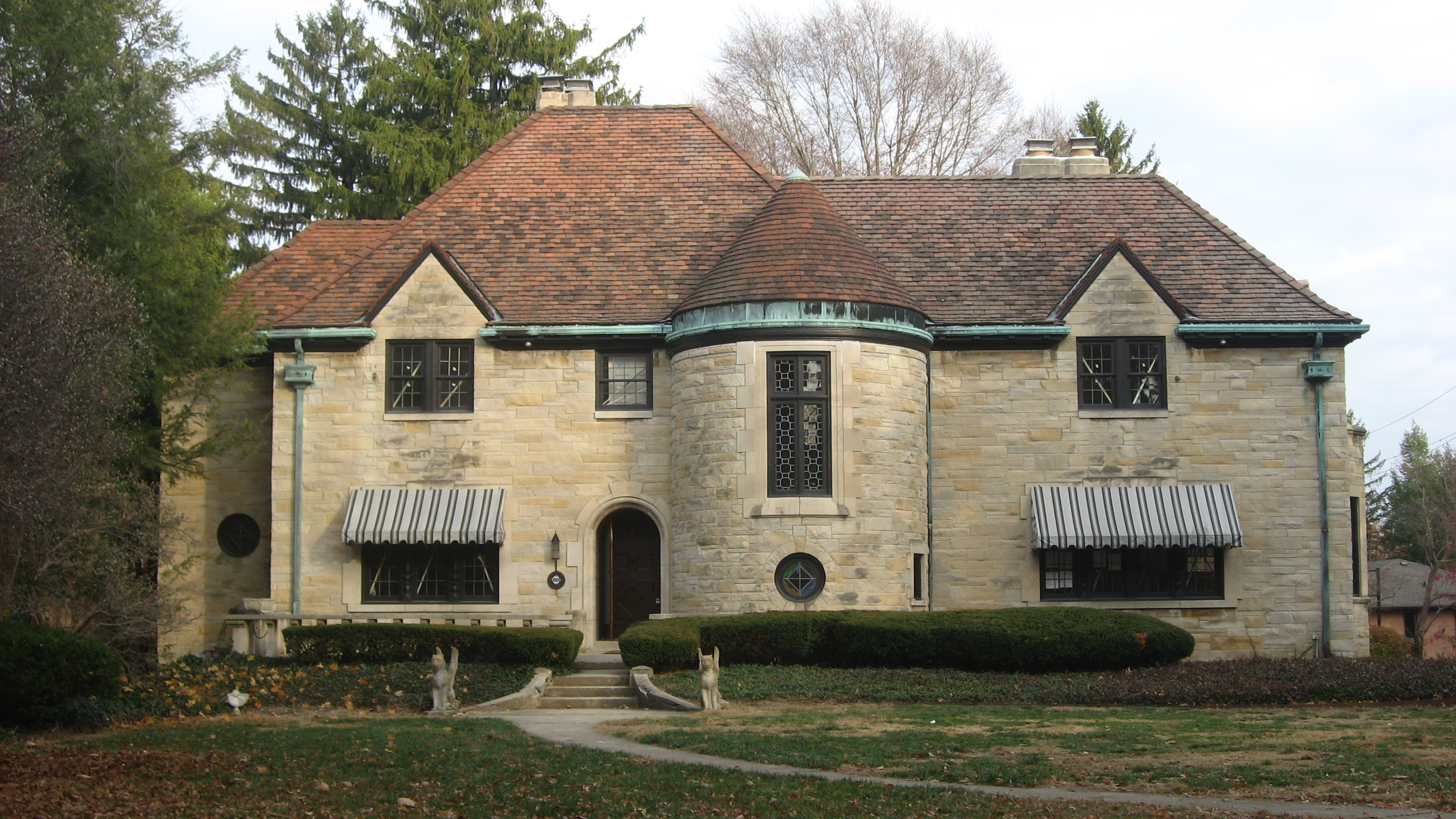
- Front of the house

- Location within Indianapolis Location within Indiana Location within the United States
- Location: 4909 N. Meridian St., Indianapolis, Indiana
- Coordinates: 39°50′35″N 86°9′24″W
- Area: 1.3 acres (0.53 ha)
- Built: 1924
- Architect: Wallick, Frederick; Cole Motor Car Company
- Architectural style: Late 19th and 20th Century Revivals, French Renaissance
- Part of: North Meridian Street Historic District (ID86002695)
- NRHP reference No.: 97000599
- Added to NRHP: June 25, 1997

The Joseph J. Cole Jr. House and 1925 Cole Brouette No. 70611 are a house and historic motor car located at 4909 N. Meridian Street in Indianapolis, Indiana. The house, also known as Colehaven, dates from 1924 and reflects Late 19th and 20th Century Revivals architecture and French Renaissance architecture. The 1.3-acre (0.53 ha) property includes the house and one other contributing structure.

The house was constructed for Joseph J. Cole Jr., the president of the Cole Motor Car Company in Indianapolis. The Cole Brouette was produced at that factory and was owned by the Cole family. The house and automobile were listed on the National Register of Historic Places in 1997.

== See also ==
- Cole Motor Car Company, also NRHP-listed in Indianapolis
- National Register of Historic Places listings in Marion County, Indiana
