= Meridian-Kessler, Indianapolis =

Neighborhood in Indianapolis, Indiana, US

Coordinates: 39°51′18″N 86°09′01″W

Meridian-Kessler is a residential neighborhood located about 4 miles (6.4 km) north of downtown Indianapolis. It is bounded on the north by Kessler Boulevard, on the east by the Monon Trail greenway corridor, on the south by 38th Street, and to the west by Meridian Street. Meridian Street forms a shared boundary with the adjacent Butler-Tarkington neighborhood.

Beginning in the very late 1890s, a few wealthy individuals built a smattering of country estates along Meridian Street and neighboring streets north of Maple Road, which is now called 38th Street. However, the area remained mostly open farmland. A few of the original farmhouses still stand, with the oldest one dating back to 1832.

In 1905, landscape architect George Kessler redesigned Maple Road into a grand urban parkway as part of his ambitious plan to form a network of parks and boulevards in Indianapolis. Also in 1905, Indianapolis annexed Meridian Street from Maple Road/38th Street up to the town of Broad Ripple, a distance of almost 2 miles (3.2 km). The city's gradual road improvements in the area encouraged residential development. The neighborhood population boomed beginning in the early 1920s, and the area became one of the most prestigious addresses in Indianapolis. Wealthy individuals built grand homes along Meridian Street, Pennsylvania Street, and Washington Boulevard. However, the neighborhood did not develop solely as an exclusive enclave for the very wealthy, and most of the new residents were upper-middle class individuals who constructed smaller, but nonetheless stately houses throughout the neighborhood. Growth continued at a slower pace in the 1930s as the neighborhood filled up, and the wealthy continued their northern migration beyond the city limits to communities such as Meridian Hills and Williams Creek, which expanded and incorporated during this decade. Nonetheless, Meridian-Kessler continued to be a neighborhood of choice for the affluent, and by the end of World War II it was built-out.

In 1965, the Meridian-Kessler Neighborhood Association was formed to unify the neighborhood and protect its unique character.

Today, Meridian-Kessler remains a predominantly upper-middle class area and a highly desirable neighborhood.

== Historic districts ==
- Forest Hills
- North Meridian Street
- Oliver Johnson's Woods
- Washington Park

== See also ==
- List of Indianapolis neighborhoods
