= Indiana Governor's Residence =

Official home of the governor of Indiana

Coordinates: 39.840779°N 86.157677°W

Governor's Residence of Indiana
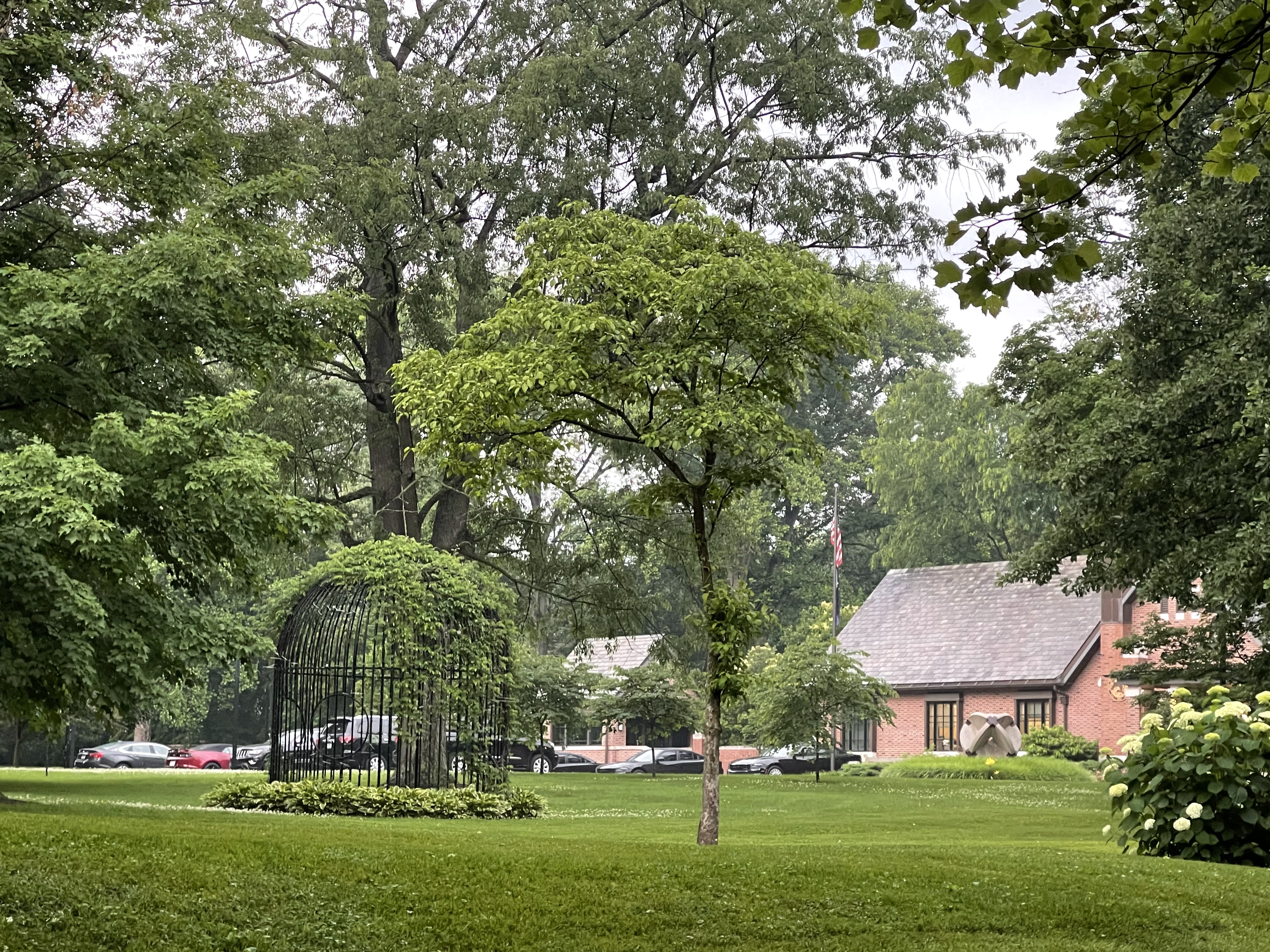
- Indiana Governor's Residence in 2022
- Interactive map of the Governor's Residence of Indiana area

General information
- Type: House
- Architectural style: English Tudor
- Location: 4750 N. Meridian Street, Indianapolis, Indiana
- Construction started: 1928
- Governing body: Governor's Residence Commission

Technical details
- Floor area: 10,500 sq ft (980 m^{2})

Design and construction
- Architect: Rubush & Hunter

The Indiana Governor's Residence is the official home of the family of the governor of Indiana and is located in Indianapolis, Indiana. In use since 1973, it is the sixth official residence of Indiana's governors. The current tenant is Governor Mike Braun.

== Current residence ==
The Indiana Governor's Residence is located in the historic district surrounding North Meridian Street in Indianapolis, Indiana. It sits on an estate of 6.5 acres (2.6 ha) at 4750 North Meridian Street. Built for Scott Wadley, with the firm of Rubush & Hunter serving as architects, the English Tudor home was built in 1928. It was acquired by the state of Indiana in 1973 from attorney C. Severin Buschman for US$242,000. The home was then renovated for approximately $800,000, including $125,000 in funds from a Lilly Endowment grant. Renovation included the installation of air conditioning and modern wiring.

Approximately 10,500 sq ft (980 m^{2}), with twenty-three rooms and eleven bathrooms, it is considered a typical size for an English Tudor home and resembles many of the other homes in the neighborhood that were built in the same time period. Although the appearance is similar to the other homes, it is structurally unique because its support and foundation are made of concrete, whereas typical Tudor homes are entirely wooden. The home's lower floor is open to the public and tours are offered regularly to visitors. The rooms available for viewing include the foyer, a library, the formal living room, formal and informal dining room, a sun porch, a kitchen, a butler's pantry, and event space. The second floor is reserved for the first family as a living area and is off limits to the public. The home receives approximately 10,000 visitors annually.

== Previous governors' residences ==
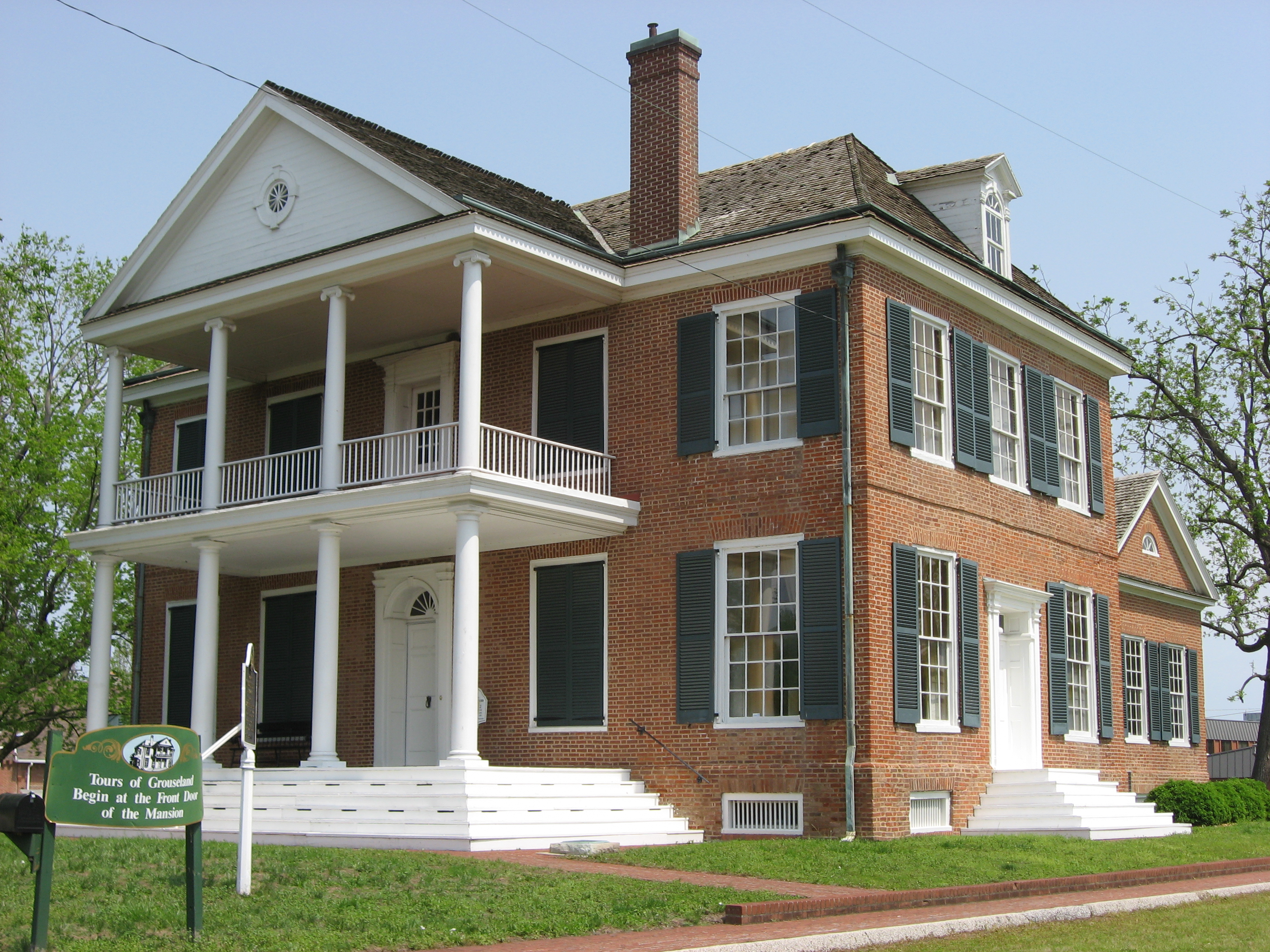
Grouseland, home of Territorial Governor William Henry Harrison in Vincennes.

Before Indiana became a state, the Indiana Territory had two governors. William Henry Harrison, the first governor, built a plantation-style home in Vincennes, and named it Grouseland for its many birds. Built in 1804, it was one of the first brick buildings in the territory. The home is still preserved and is a National Historic Landmark. Thomas Posey, the territory's second governor, had a home built in Corydon, but lived there only briefly before moving to Jeffersonville where he rented a room in a boarding house. The Posey House is preserved as part of a National Historic District.

There have been six official residences of Indiana's governors since Indiana became a state, but only five were actually inhabited by the first family. There were four other unofficial residences that governors also lived in while no other accommodations were available. The first residence of a state governor was in Corydon on a small hill overlooking the first statehouse; Governor Jonathan Jennings and his wife Anne lived in it from 1816 until 1822. The home was visited by United States Presidents Andrew Jackson and James Monroe. The building is no longer standing but a new home has been built upon its original foundation and uses its cellar as a basement. Governor William Hendricks also lived in Corydon at Governor Hendricks Headquarters, an unofficial residence purchased by Hendricks from Davis Floyd and located on the same block as Jennings' home. Floyd had built the home for himself, but lost it after the Panic of 1819. Hendricks lived there during his term as governor, from 1822 to 1825, and later sold it.

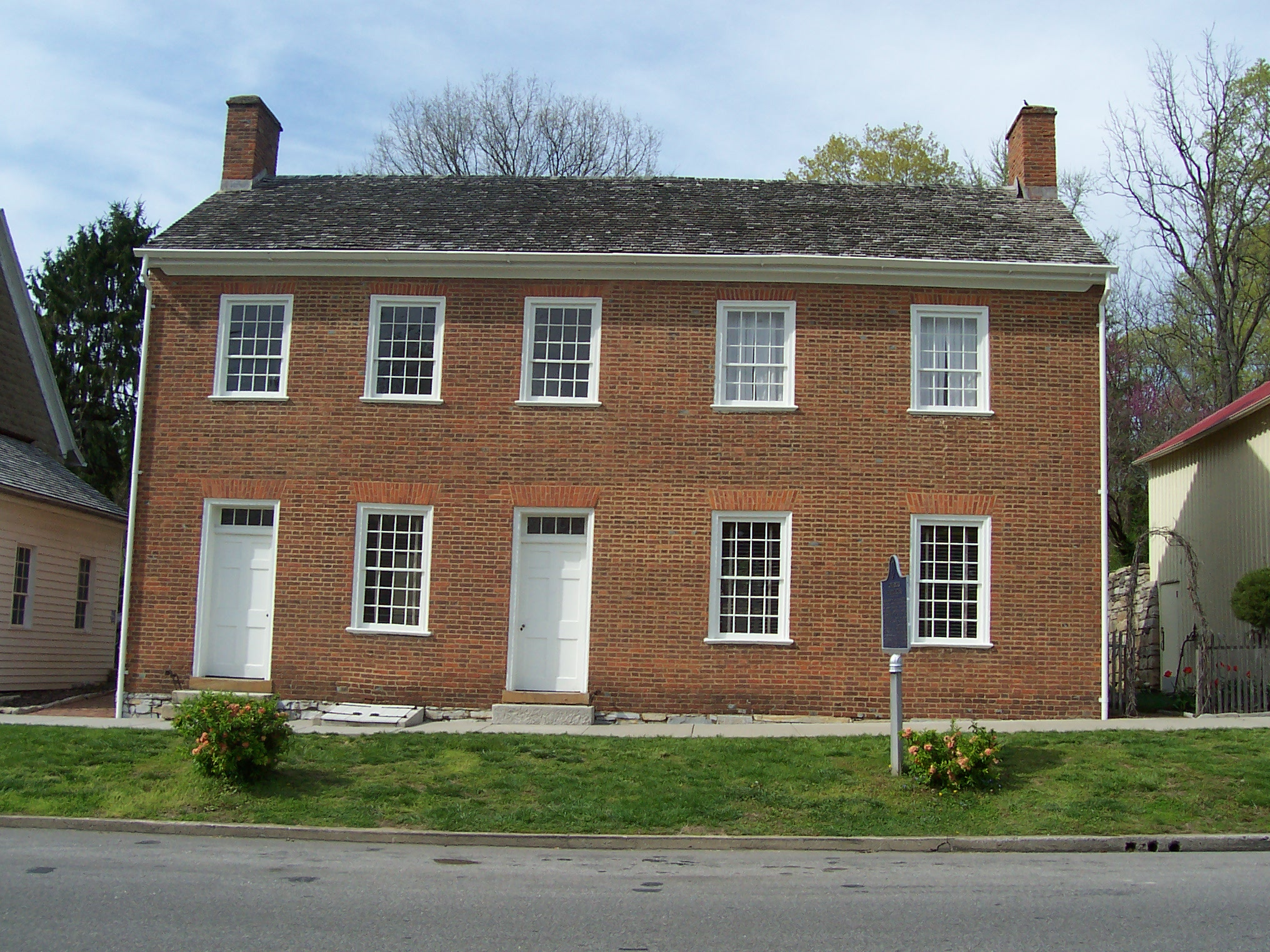
Governor William Hendricks headquarters in Corydon.

The second official residence for the state's governor was built in the center of Indianapolis where the Indiana Soldiers' and Sailors' Monument now stands. It was designed by Alexander Ralston, who also laid out most of the city. The mansion cost $6,500 and was completed in 1827 during the term of Governor James B. Ray. Ray's wife refused to live in the home because of its lack of privacy; it was never used by a governor. It was inhabited by Indiana Chief Justice Isaac Blackford from around 1830 until the 1850s. It was demolished in the 1870s.

Without an acceptable home for the governor, the state purchased the house of Dr. John H. Sanders to serve as a residence for the Governor in 1837. The location, on the corner of Market and Illinois Streets in Indianapolis, proved to be damp and unhealthy because of the wetland conditions of the area during that time. Governor James Whitcomb blamed the conditions for his wife's death. The home was abandoned in 1861 during the term of Oliver Morton, who briefly lived in the house but refused to stay. The house was sold during his term and eventually destroyed.

The governors remained without an official residence until 1919 when the state purchased a home located at 101 East 27th St., Indianapolis, for $65,000 and furnished it for an additional $20,000. It was built by Henry Kahn in 1908 and had the design of an English country house. The home had a Gothic interior with high, beamed ceilings and luxurious Wilton carpeting. After a brief renovation, the home was inhabited by the governor starting in 1919 and remained so until 1945. The building was sold by the state to the Marott Hotel, which intended to turn it into a clubhouse, but eventually demolished it in 1962 to clear land for a parking lot.

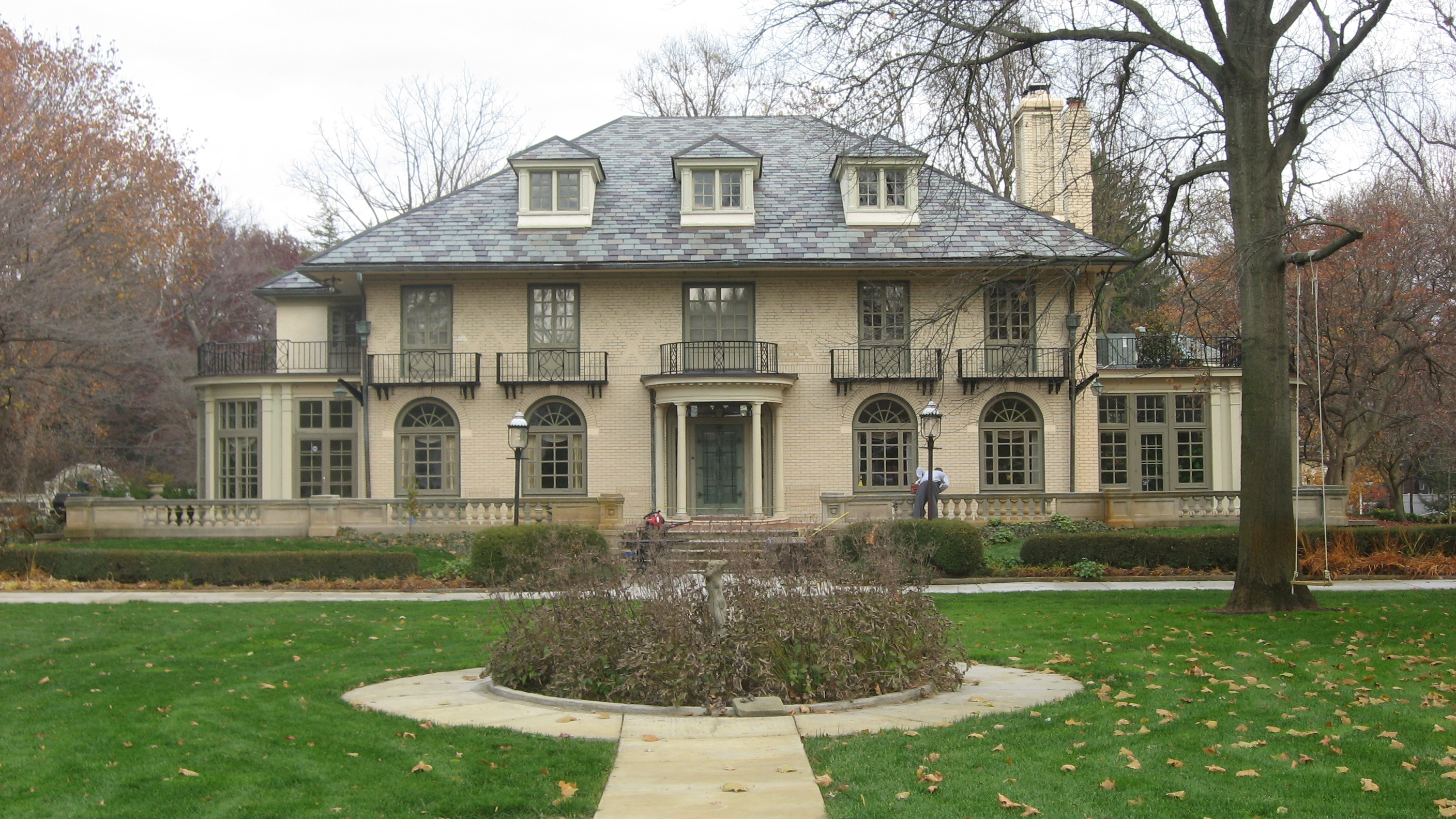
4343 N. Meridian Street

The fifth home for the governor was purchased in 1945 and located at 4343 N. Meridian St. The home was built in 1924 by Harry Lane, an auditor for the Indianapolis Stockyards. Three stories high with slated roofs and 12 rooms, it was famed for its golden bathroom fixtures and its high gilt-tipped iron fence. The home was sold two years later to J.H. Trimble, who lived there until his death in 1937. It was purchased from his widow for $72,000. It served as residence for the governor from 1945 until the present mansion was purchased in 1973. The home was sold at an auction in 1973 to Robert L. Dawson, who in turn sold it to Dr. John C. Klein in 1978. Known as the William N. Thompson House, it was added to the National Register of Historic Places in 1982.

After the building was auctioned, there was a brief period while the current residence was in renovation. During that period, governors Edgar Whitcomb and Otis Bowen took up residence in Riley Towers located at 650 N. Alabama St. The state leased the penthouse for their residence at a cost of $1,150 per month.

== Gallery ==
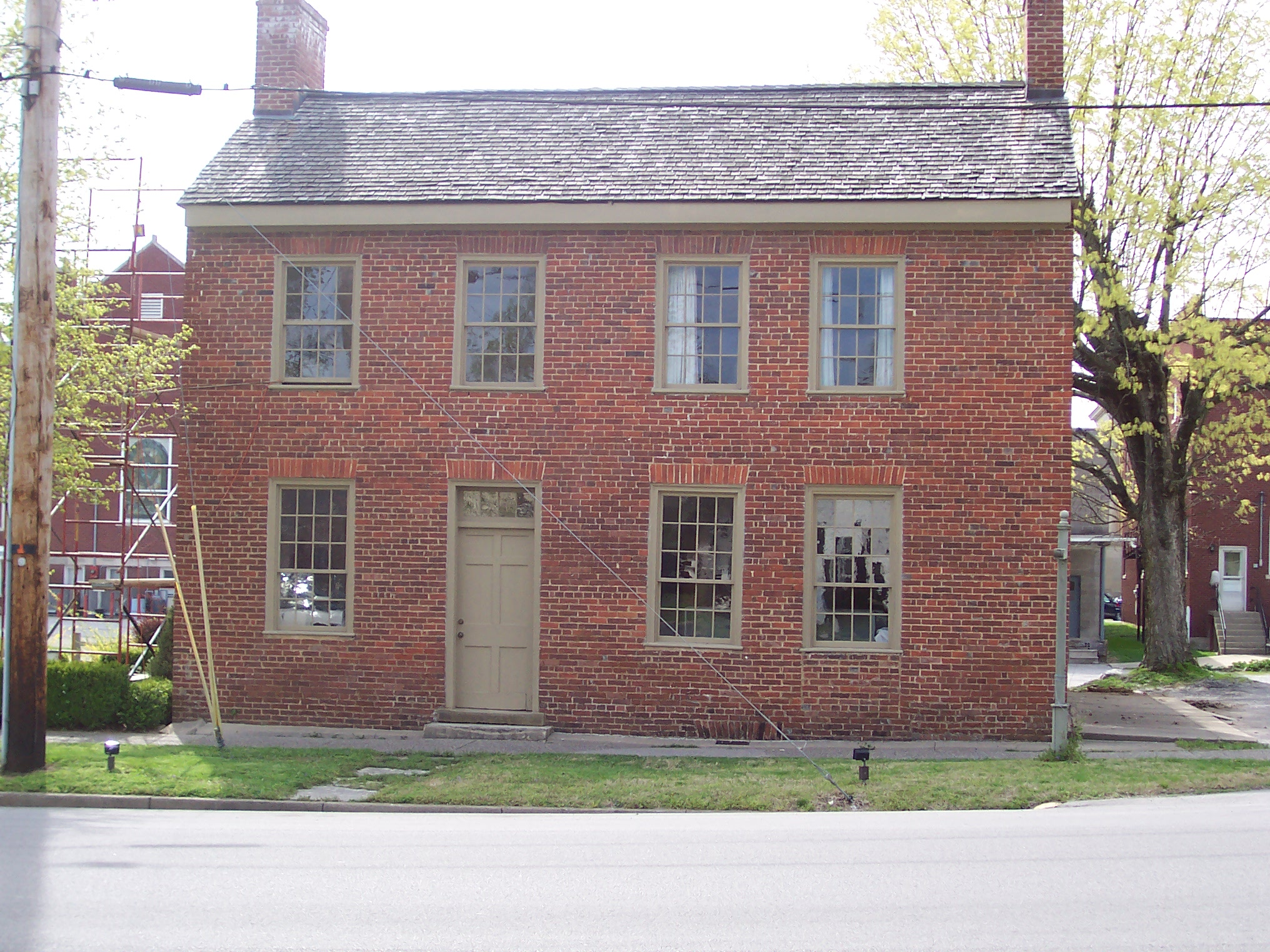
Home of Governor Thomas Posey in Corydon

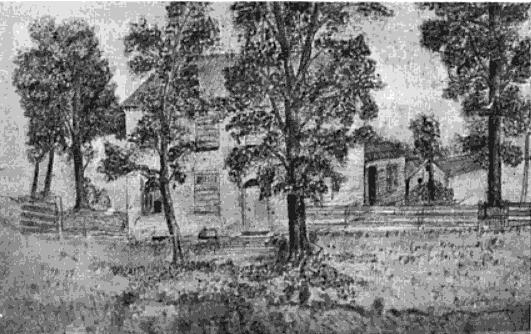
Home of Jonathan Jennings, the first official governor's residence.

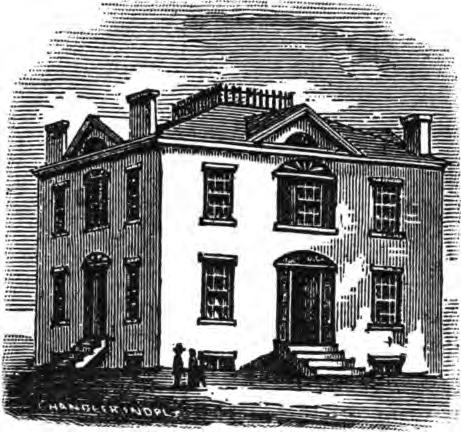
A sketch of the second official Governor's Mansion, located in Indianapolis

== Governor's Residence Commission ==
The governor's residence is maintained by a trust managed by the Governor's Residence Commission and is part of the Indiana Public Building Foundation located at 4750 N. Meridian St., Indianapolis. The commission was authorized in 1975, charged with overseeing the renovation and maintenance of the home as well as event planning. In 2008, the commission's members included Linda Goad, Sara Barclay, David Collins, Jim Baker, Mike Bosway, Judy Warren, and Shannon Rezek. The commission is partly funded by private donations. The members are appointed by the Governor and serve at term lengths of his choosing. The commission meets monthly and officially reports to the Office of First Lady. The commission serves without pay, but is reimbursed for expenses.

== See also ==
- Indiana Statehouse
- Governor of Indiana

== Sources ==
- Dunn, Jacob Piatt (1919). Indiana and Indianans. New York and Chicago: American Historical Society. pp. 336.
- Federal Writers' Project (1947). Indiana. A Guide to the Hoosier State. US History Publishers. ISBN 1-60354-013-X.
