= Butler–Tarkington, Indianapolis =

Neighborhood in Indianapolis, Indiana, US

Coordinates: 39°50′25″N 86°09′58″W

Butler–Tarkington is a neighborhood on the north side of Indianapolis, Indiana, United States. It is bordered by 38th Street and Crown Hill Cemetery to the south, the Indiana Central Canal and Westfield Boulevard to the north, Michigan Road to the west, and Meridian Street to the east.

== History ==
The neighborhood began as a farming settlement in the 1840s near what is now the intersection of 38th Street and Illinois Street. The settlement was called Mapleton due to the large number of maple trees in the area. 38th Street, which now forms the southern boundary of the neighborhood, was originally called Maple Road. The settlement was connected to the railway system of Indianapolis in the 1860s. In 1890, the city's electric street car system ran a line through the neighborhood. Mapleton was annexed by Indianapolis in 1902, and most of the rest of the neighborhood was annexed by 1906. Residential development took off in the 1910s and 1920s. By the end of World War II, the neighborhood was built-out.

The neighborhood's demographics was almost exclusively white up until the mid-1950s when African-Americans began moving into the southwest portion of the neighborhood. The Butler–Tarkington Neighborhood Association was formed in 1956 to help foster community relations and ease the tensions resulting from racial integration of the neighborhood. Today, one-third of the residents are African-American. The community continues to be seen as an example of successful neighborhood integration.

The neighborhood consists mainly of working to upper-middle-class households, with wealthier households inhabiting the much grander homes along the western edge of Meridian Street, and also portions of Illinois Street north of 40th Street. Butler–Tarkington is known for its attractive residential architecture.

The Indiana Governor's Residence has been located in Butler-Tarkington since 1973 when the State of Indiana purchased 4750 North Meridian Street for that purpose.

=== Education ===
The neighborhood's name comes from Butler University and the famous writer Booth Tarkington. The university is located in the western portion of the neighborhood. Tarkington lived in the neighborhood on his North Meridian Street estate for 23 years until his death in 1946. Butler University moved from Irvington on the city's then-far east side to the Butler–Tarkington neighborhood in 1928 when it acquired what had been the community's 300-acre (1.2 km^{2}) Fairview Park.

The first non-college level school to open in the neighborhood was Indianapolis Public Schools James Whitcomb Riley School 43, which opened in the village of Mapleton in 1883. The school moved into its present building at 150 West 40th Street in 1909. IPS Dewitt S. Morgan School 86 was built in 1928 at 49th Street and Boulevard Place and housed the International School of Indiana from 1997 to 2022. In 1939, St. Thomas Aquinas parish opened its school (which serves kindergarten through eighth grade) at 4600 North Illinois Street. The Christian Theological Seminary was formed as an independent educational institution from Butler University in 1958 and opened its own campus next to the university in 1966.

The Butler University Police Department is the primary responder to 911 calls in the Butler–Tarkington neighborhood.

== See also ==
- List of neighborhoods in Indianapolis
- North Meridian Street Historic District
