= Indianapolis Opera =

Professional opera company in Indianapolis, Indiana, US

- Formation: 1975
- Type: Theatre group
- Purpose: Opera
- Location: Indianapolis, Indiana, USA
- Artistic director: David Craig Starkey
- Website: www.indyopera.org

Indianapolis Opera is an opera company based in Indianapolis, Indiana. It is the only professional opera company in Indiana, and it hosts a number of fully staged productions each season. The company is led by General Director David Craig Starkey and Board President Michael Schultz. The digital collection for the Indianapolis Opera is held at the Indianapolis Public Library and includes past promotional materials, material related to educational programming of the Indianapolis Opera Ensemble, and photographs of past performances.

== History ==
Since 1975, Indianapolis Opera has presented 109 operatic productions representing the work of 32 different composers, including 13 composers who wrote in the 20th century. Selected works range from standard operatic repertoire to new or less-performed works, balancing musical style and language as well as comedy and tragedy.

== The Frank and Katrina Basile Opera Center ==
In 2008, Bill Oesterle, a local business entrepreneur, purchased the Holy Trinity Greek Orthodox Church building in the Meridian-Kessler neighborhood of Indianapolis and leased it to the Indianapolis Opera. The Indianapolis Opera went on to use the building for rehearsals, educational programs, and smaller performances. In 2015, the opera began producing performances at the Schrott Center for the Arts on the campus of Butler University.

== Educational outreach programs ==
The Indianapolis Opera Ensemble of the Indianapolis Opera has provided educational programming throughout the state of Indiana, as well as Michigan, Illinois, and Kentucky. The program reaches 30,000 children and adults each year. Other educational programs are the Resident Artist program, Opera's Rising Stars (presented in collaboration with the Indianapolis Chamber Orchestra), and specific annual outreach events, such as Lobster Palooza, held as a fundraiser for the opera and educational outreach programs, and the opera ball
