= Morrison Block =

- Morrison Block (M. O'Connor Grocery Wholesalers)
- U.S. National Register of Historic Places
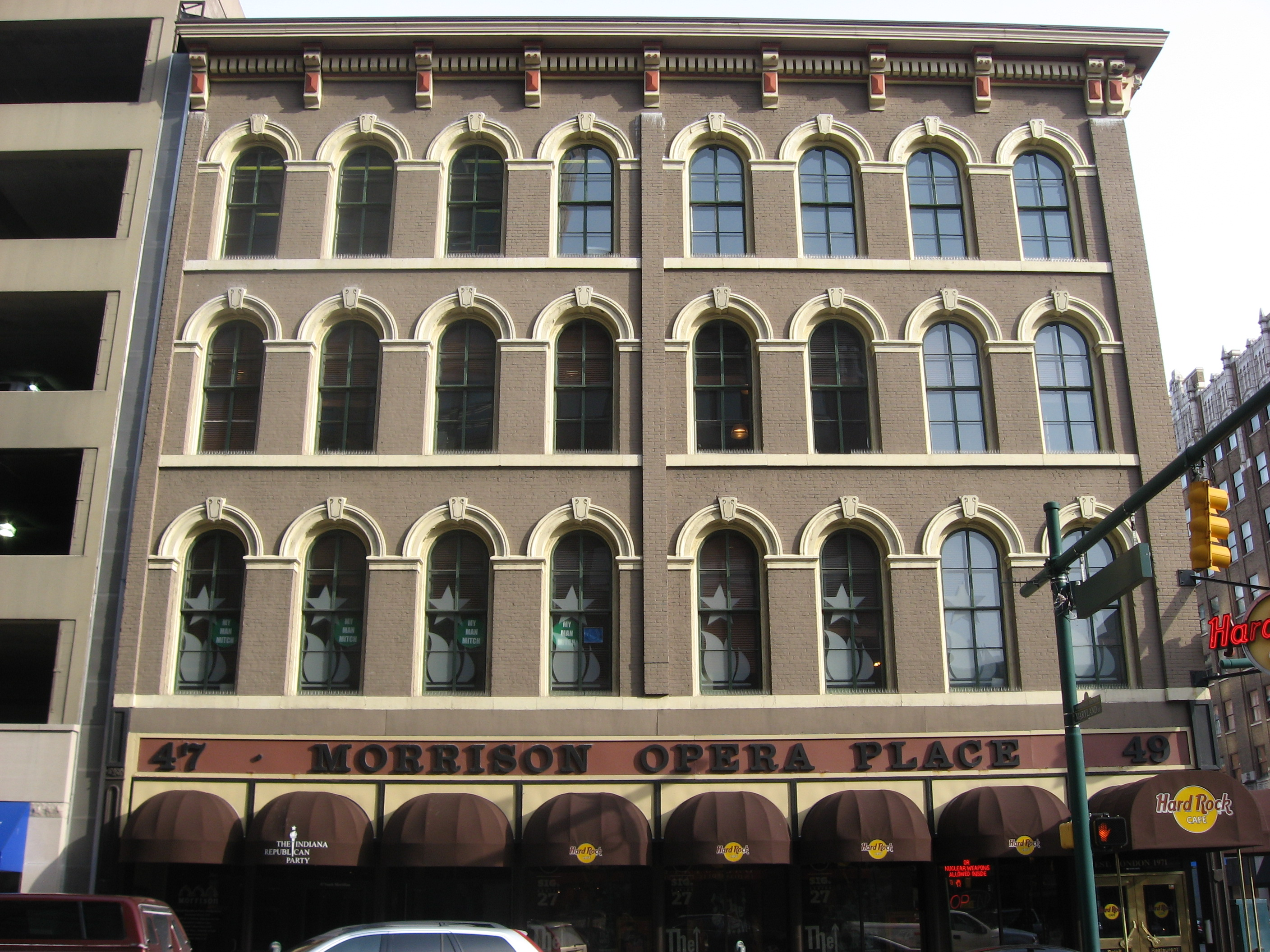
- Morrison Block, January 2010

- Location within Indianapolis Location within Indianapolis Location within Indiana Location within the United States
- Location: 47 S. Meridian St., Indianapolis, Indiana
- Coordinates: 39°45′56″N 86°9′29″W
- Area: Less than 1 acre (0.40 ha)
- Built: c. 1870
- Architectural style: Italianate
- NRHP reference No.: 79000038
- Added to NRHP: November 15, 1979

The Morrison Block, also known as M. O'Connor Grocery Wholesalers and Peoples Outfitting Building, is a historic commercial building located on South Meridian Street in Indianapolis, Indiana, United States. It was built about 1870, and is a four-story, Italianate style timber frame and masonry building. It features round arched windows and a projecting cornice. The building has been restored.

It was listed on the National Register of Historic Places in 1979.

== See also ==
- National Register of Historic Places listings in Center Township, Marion County, Indiana
