= Schnull–Rauch House =

Historic house in Indiana, United States

- U.S. National Register of Historic Places
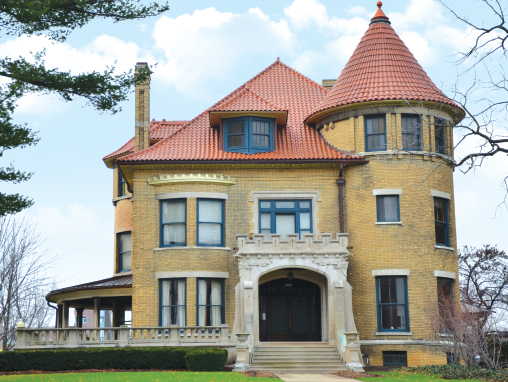
- Schnull–Rauch House in 2013

- Location within Indianapolis Location within Indiana Location within the United States
- Location: 3050 N. Meridian St., Indianapolis, Indiana
- Coordinates: 39.8116°N 86.1573°W
- Built: 1904
- Architect: Bernard Vonnegut, Sr.
- Architectural style: Romanesque Revival
- NRHP reference No.: 79000037
- Added to NRHP: November 14, 1979

The Schnull–Rauch House, sometimes referred to as the Victorian Manor and now also branded as The Manor at The Children's Museum of Indianapolis, is a National Register of Historic Places-designated Romanesque Revival historic home constructed in the early 20th century at 3050 North Meridian Street, north of downtown Indianapolis, Indiana.

In 1979, the building was donated by John Rauch Jr. to the Junior League of Indianapolis to be used for their headquarters and operated as an event venue and house museum. In 2009, the building was purchased by The Children's Museum of Indianapolis, which sits on adjacent property, and is currently an event venue.

== History ==
The land on which the house was built was purchased by Gustav A. and Matilda Mayer Schnull, of the wealthy Schnull merchant family, in 1901. They worked together with the architect Bernard Vonnegut of Vonnegut and Bohn, who was the husband of Matilda's sister, in designing the house, and the Brandt Brothers firm built it. Construction began in the fall of 1902, and the Schnulls and their three daughters moved in on April 4, 1904. After Matilda's death in 1923, their daughter Gertrude and her husband John G. Rauch, a lawyer who became president of the Art Association of Indianapolis, joined Gustav in the home. The house remained a residence for the Rauch family until the late 1970s, and kept its original furnishings and design into the modern era.

After John Rauch died in February 1978, his son John Rauch Jr. worked with the Historic Landmarks Foundation of Indiana to conduct a study on the future use of the home, intending to donate it for community use. There was serious consideration given to converting the building into the official mayor's residence, official city reception house, a community center, a house museum, or allowing The Children's Museum of Indianapolis to absorb it. After city use of the building was ruled out due to the taxpayer expense that would be required for its upkeep, the Rauch family eventually decided to donate it to the Junior League of Indianapolis. The first floor remained true to the original decorations, and was used for receptions and as a museum, while the second floor was rented for other non-profits' use, and the third floor was reserved for the Junior League headquarters. The Junior League moved its headquarters to the building and constructed a parking lot in 1981, and in 1983 it completed the restoration of the structure. The house was built to be used for entertaining, with a spacious ballroom with a dance floor, formal drawing room, and library, and these features have allowed it to continue to be used as a popular venue for weddings and other events; by the 1990s, reservations were required a year in advance for wedding receptions due to its popularity.

The Children's Museum of Indianapolis purchased the property from the Junior League in 2008, to be used for events. In the spring of 2013, the house was renovated as part of the St. Margaret's Hospital Guild's annual Decorators' Show House and Gardens charity event. The Children's Museum brands the building as "The Manor at The Children's Museum of Indianapolis".

== Architectural and historical significance ==
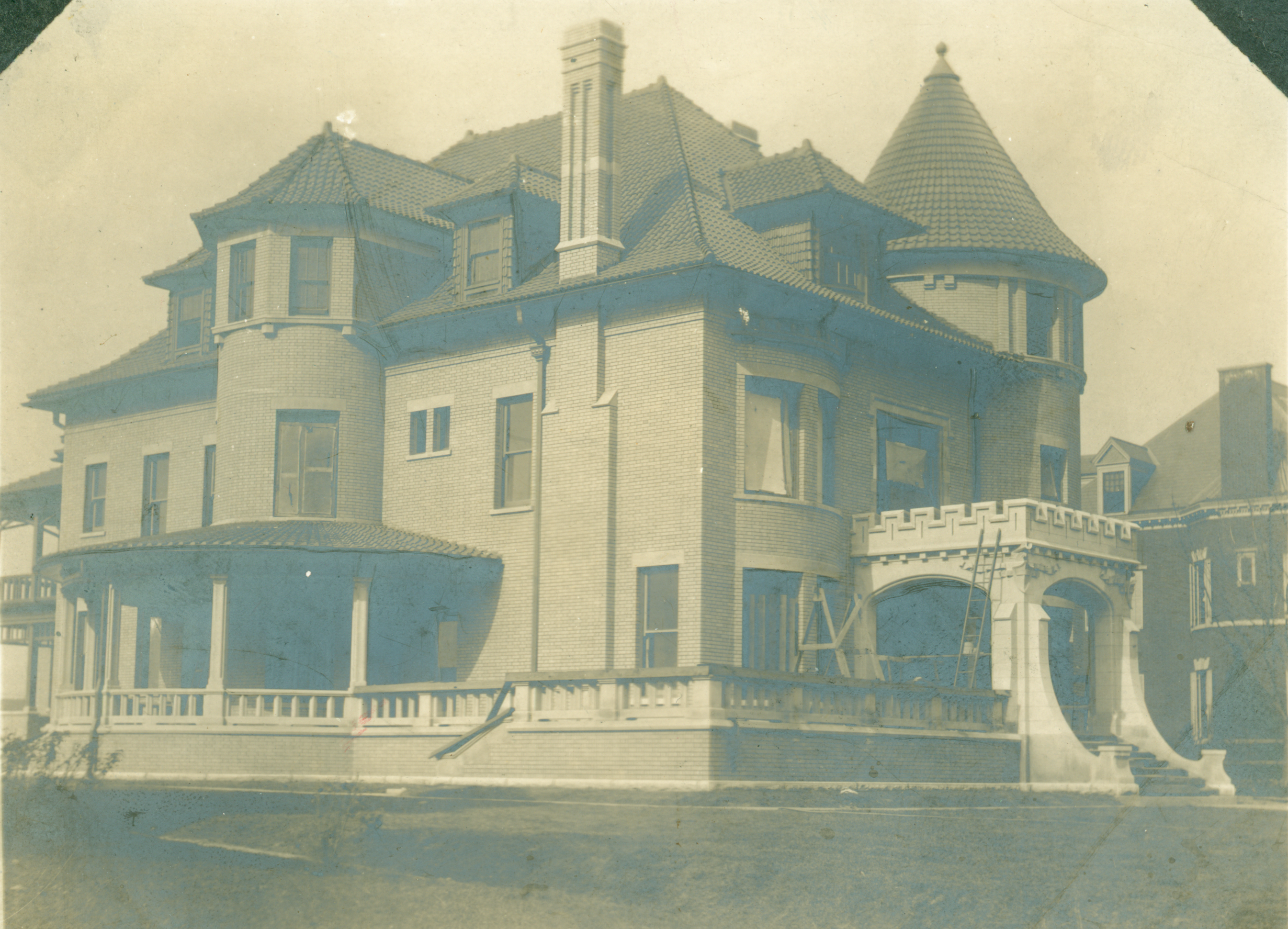
Schnull–Rauch House after completion in 1904

The three-story structure is described as Romanesque Revival architecture. The house was originally decorated with oriental rugs from Persia, moire silk wallpaper, several ornate mantles, stained glass windows, heavy velvet curtains, hand-carved woodwork, inlaid hardwood floors, and marble bathrooms—much of which survives to the present. The building is unique in being the only remaining historic home of its era along Meridian Street not to have been demolished or remodeled as offices. The house also exhibits many surviving objects from the Schnull and Mayer German immigrant families to which Gustav and Matilda Schnull belonged, prominent in the Indianapolis banking and wholesaling industries in the late 19th century.

Called "one of the best-designed of the city's Meridian Street mansions" by the Indianapolis Historic Preservation Commission, the house is also an outstanding example of the architecture of Bernard Vonnegut, a German-trained architect and the first licensed architect in Indiana, who designed many other Indianapolis landmarks. He took a special interest in the house, as he was personally designing it for his brother- and sister-in-law. He also designed the china cabinets, mantelpieces, and carved wood sideboards. The house is architecturally distinctive for its castle keep-inspired tower, thick brick walls, red tile roof, and large stone porch entrance.

== See also ==
- National Register of Historic Places listings in Center Township, Marion County, Indiana
