= Cole Motor Car Company =

Car manufacturer

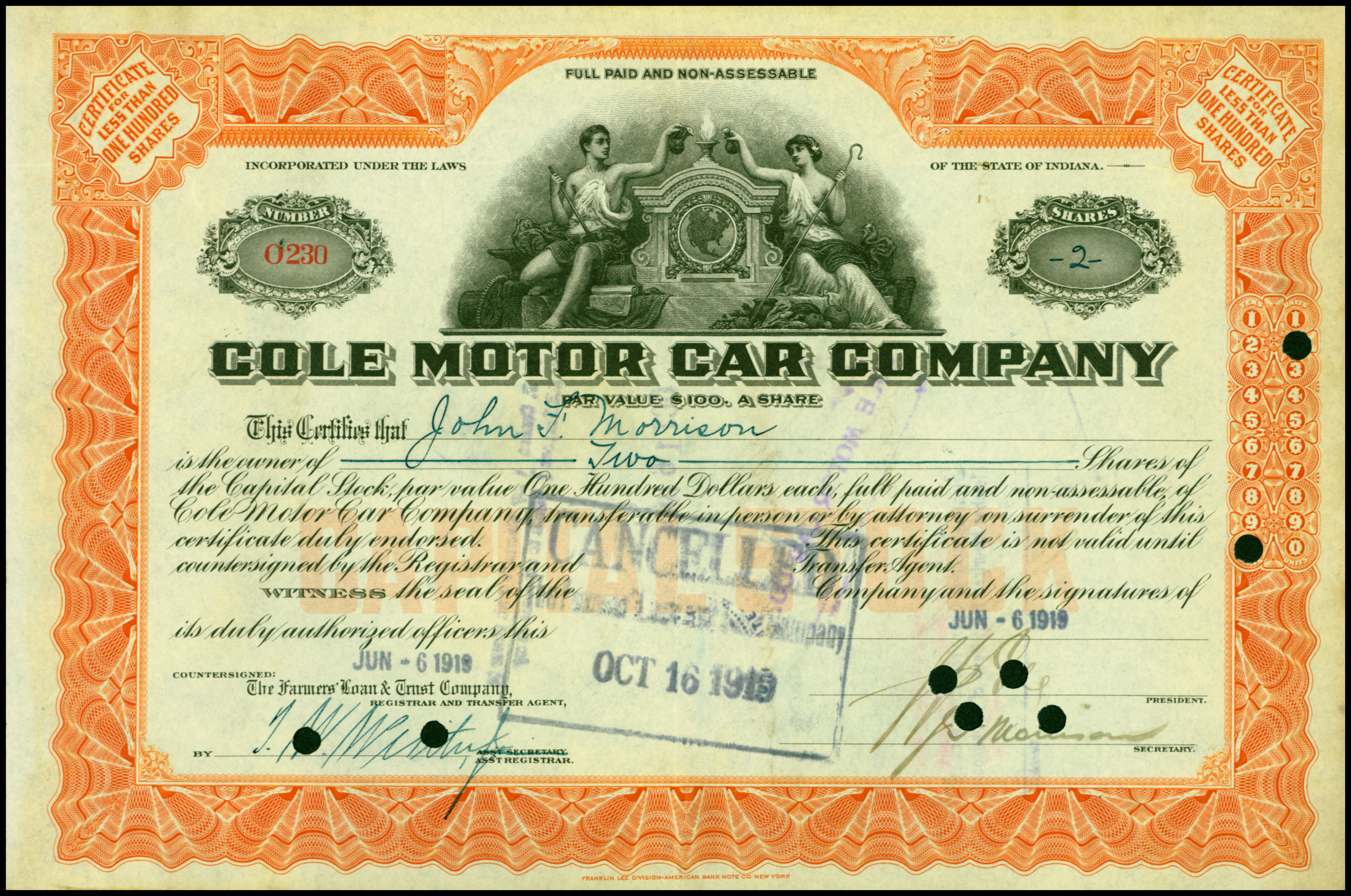
- Share of the Cole Motor Car Company, issued June 6, 1919
- Type: Automobile Company
- Industry: Manufacturing
- Founded: 1909
- Founder: Joseph J. Cole
- Defunct: 1925
- Headquarters: Indianapolis, Indiana, United States
- Key people: Joseph J. Cole (executive chairman & president); Charles S. Crawford (chief engineer)
- Products: Automobiles

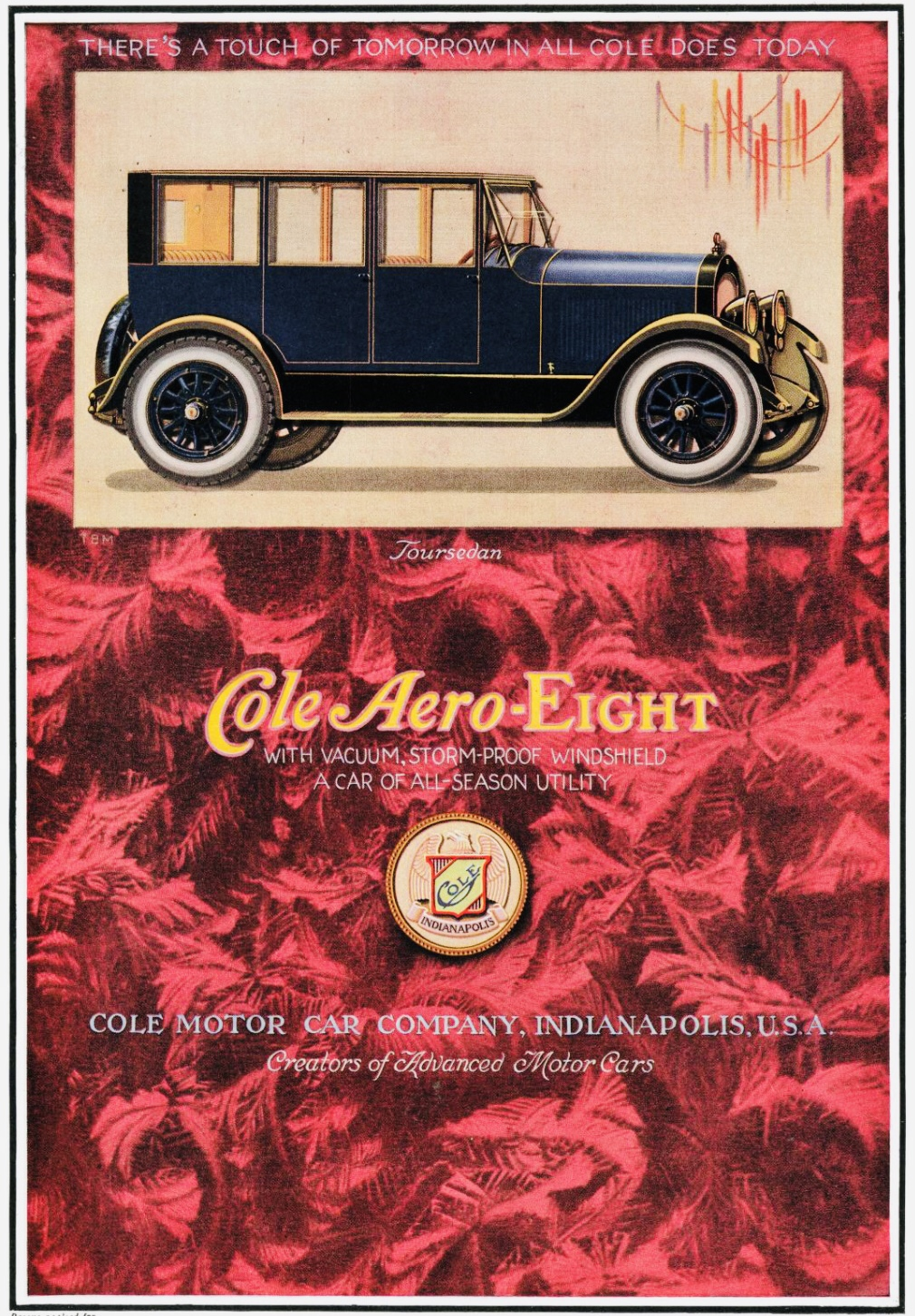
Cole Aero Eight 880 (1920–1921)

The Cole Motor Car Company was an early automobile maker based in Indianapolis, Indiana. Cole automobiles were built from 1908 until 1925. They were quality-built luxury cars. The make is a pioneer of the V8 engine.

== Early years ==
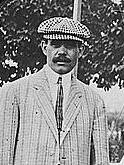
Joseph Jarrett Cole on 5 September 1911

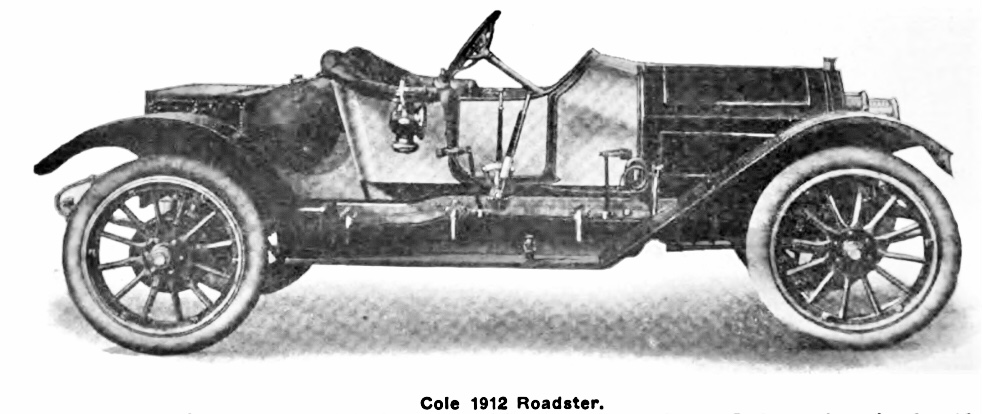
Cole Forty Roadster (1912)

Joseph J. Cole (1869–1925) made his first attempt to build a car in 1903 at Rockford, Illinois. Together with his son, he owned a shop where they sold wheels, automobiles, motor bikes, and even lawn mowers, and also performed mechanical repairs. Together they worked on a 4-cylinder touring car that was planned to be sold as the Rockford. The project went nowhere, and instead they opened a Rambler automobile dealership.

In 1904, Cole bought the Gates-Osborne Carriage Company and soon renamed it the Cole Carriage Company. There, he built his first automobile. It was a high-wheeled motor buggy with a two-cylinder engine. Legend goes that he forgot to fit brakes on this car and on his first trip, had to drive until the tank was empty.

In 1904, the Cole Carriage Company was building approximately 3,000 carriages annually. Production of this car started in the same year assisted by engineer Charles S. Crawford, who later worked for Stutz. The new car was marketed as the "Cole Solid Tire Automobile". Cole sold about 170 of these high wheelers before deciding that this type car had no future.

In June 1909, Cole Carriage Company was reorganized as the Cole Motor Car Company and developed a conventional small car, the Cole Model 30. Confusingly designated, it had a two-cylinder engine that only delivered 14 HP. It rode on a 90-inch (2,300 mm) wheelbase. The only body style was a runabout that he offered with 2, 2/4, or 4 seats at $725, $750, or $775, respectively. The Solid Tire Automobile was still available. About 100 cars were built.

== Four-cylinder engines ==
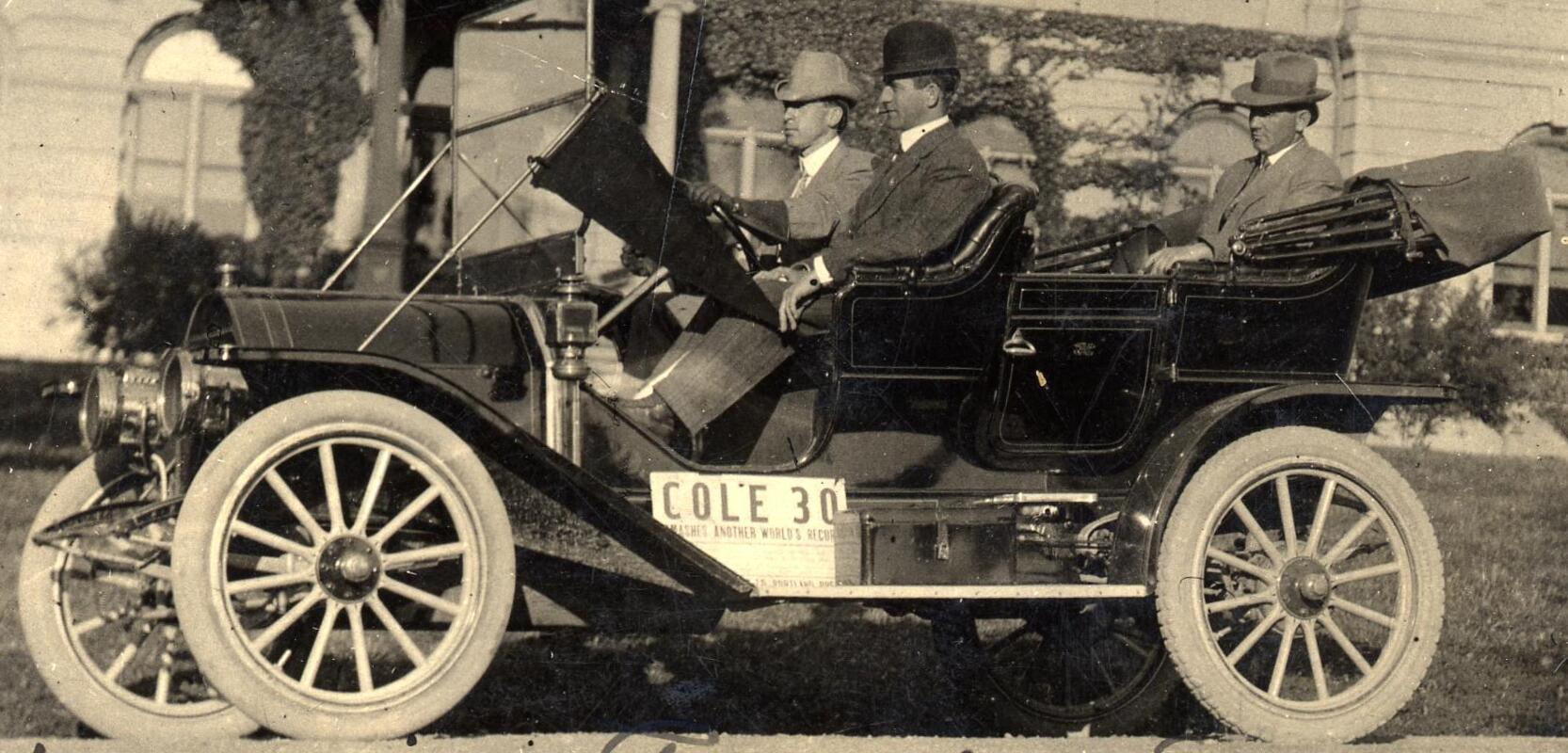
Men in a Cole 30 car at the University of Oregon, circa 1910

At the end of 1909 a completely new car appeared as a 1910 model. This was also dubbed the Series 30 referring to its new 30 HP, four-cylinder engine. The wheelbase had now grown to 108 inches (2,700 mm). There were four open body styles. Least expensive was the Tourabout at $1,400; the others, two touring cars and a runabout called the "Flyer", were $1,500 each. Cole managed to sell 783 cars before year's end.

The "Flyer" was quite successful in automobile races, too. One of them won the 1909 Brighton Beach Marathon, a 24-hour-race with 16 participants. Also, two Series 30 Flyers, driven by William "Wild Bill" Endicott and Louis Edwards, entered the Massapequa Sweepstakes, one of the 1910 Vanderbilt Cup Races. Endicott won the prestigious 10-lap event, covering 126.4 miles (203.4 km) in 138 min 4.32 sec.

The Cole Series 30 got a substantially longer chassis with a wheelbase of 118 inches (3,000 mm) and new bodies for 1911. Available were a roadster and a touring car for 2 or 5 passengers, respectively, at $1,600 each. There was also a new 5-passenger „Fore-door Touring“ (which means that it had rear and front doors) and a "Toy Tonneau" for 4 passengers (a sporty, close-coupled body style that was quite popular at the time) at $1,650 each.

A Series 40 replaced the 30 in 1912. This car was bigger with a 122-inch (3,100 mm) wheelbase. It had a more powerful 40 HP (N.A.C.C. rating; equivalent to about 60 bhp (45 kW)), four-cylinder motor with a displacement of 286.3 c.i. (c. 4.7-litre). Prices started at $1,885 for each of the four open body styles. There were also a "Colonial Coupe" for $2,500 and two limousines at $3,000 and $3,250. These prices brought Cole well into the luxury car market.

== The New Six ==
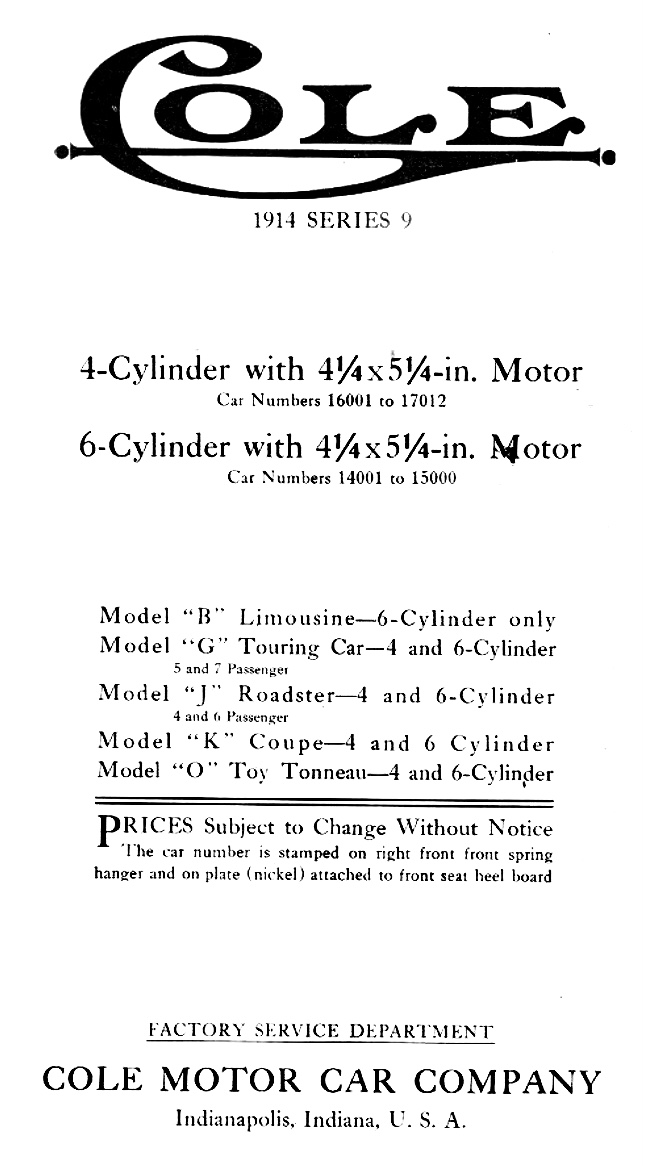
Spare parts list for models B, G, J, K, and O

For 1913, Cole expanded to no less than three model lines: The Series 40, now on a 116 in (2,946 mm) wheelbase, a 50 HP Series 50 that got the previous 40 chassis, and their first six-cylinder car. Although designated the Series 60, it had in fact 40 HP. Wheelbase was huge at 132 in (3,353 mm); prices were $2,485 for one of the open body styles but went up to $3,000 for a coupe and an astronomical $4,250 for a 7-passenger Berline-Limousine. The Series 40 was cut to two open styles, a roadster and a touring car, for $1,685 each. In the Series 50, the same body styles were offered, plus a toy tonneau, at $1,985 each. Further, Coles got electric ignition and lighting for the first time.

1914 brought several changes. Series 40 and 50 were replaced by a new Model Four, a 4-cylinder car with 28.9 HP and a wheelbase of 120 inches (3,000 mm). Offered were roadster, touring car and toy tonneau at $1,925 each, plus a 3-passenger coupe for $2,350. The 6-cylinder car also was renamed the Six. It got 43.8 HP and an even larger chassis with a wheelbase of 136 inches (3,500 mm). There was a big 7-passenger touring car, plus the usual roadster and toy tonneau, each at $2,600. A coupe could be had for $3,000 and a limousine for $4,000.

Sales had been low in 1914, so Cole reduced prices for 1915. Further, there were new designations - again - and even some new cars, too. The Four was now called the Standard 4-40. It lost the toy tonneau, and the remaining cars were offered much cheaper: $1,485 for the two open cars and $1,885 for the coupe. The Six was split into two ranges. The smaller Model 6-50 got a 29 HP engine and a 126 in (3,200 mm). wheelbase. It offered a 4- and a 7-passenger touring car $1,865 (still cheaper than the previous Four), a roadster that became more expensive at $2,465 and the coupe at $2,250. Although the new Big Six 6-60, built on the previous year's 136-inch (3,500 mm) chassis, got a powerful 40 HP engine, prices were lower than the earlier Sixes: Roadster and 7-passenger touring car for $2,465, coupe at $2,750, and limousine at $3,750. Joseph Cole negotiated with William C. Durant about a take-over that would have made Cole a GM subsidiary. Cole finally refused.

== Assembled car ==
Cole could shuffle with models and engines the way it did for two reasons: The first was that until 1915, the company refused to offer their cars on a yearly model change but relied on series that were replaced when management felt the necessity for it. Many early cars were built this way, and Packard, for example, stayed with this system until late in the 1930s.

The second reason was that the Cole was an assembled car; that means that all important components such as engine, clutch, transmission, axles etc. were bought from outside sources. Manufacturers of such cars had a slightly lesser reputation than those who built all parts themselves. For Cole, this was not only the simpler way to build a car, but Joseph Cole thought that specialized suppliers could give more attention to their items. Thus, he preferred the term "standardized car" over the usual "assembled car".

== The Cole V-8 ==
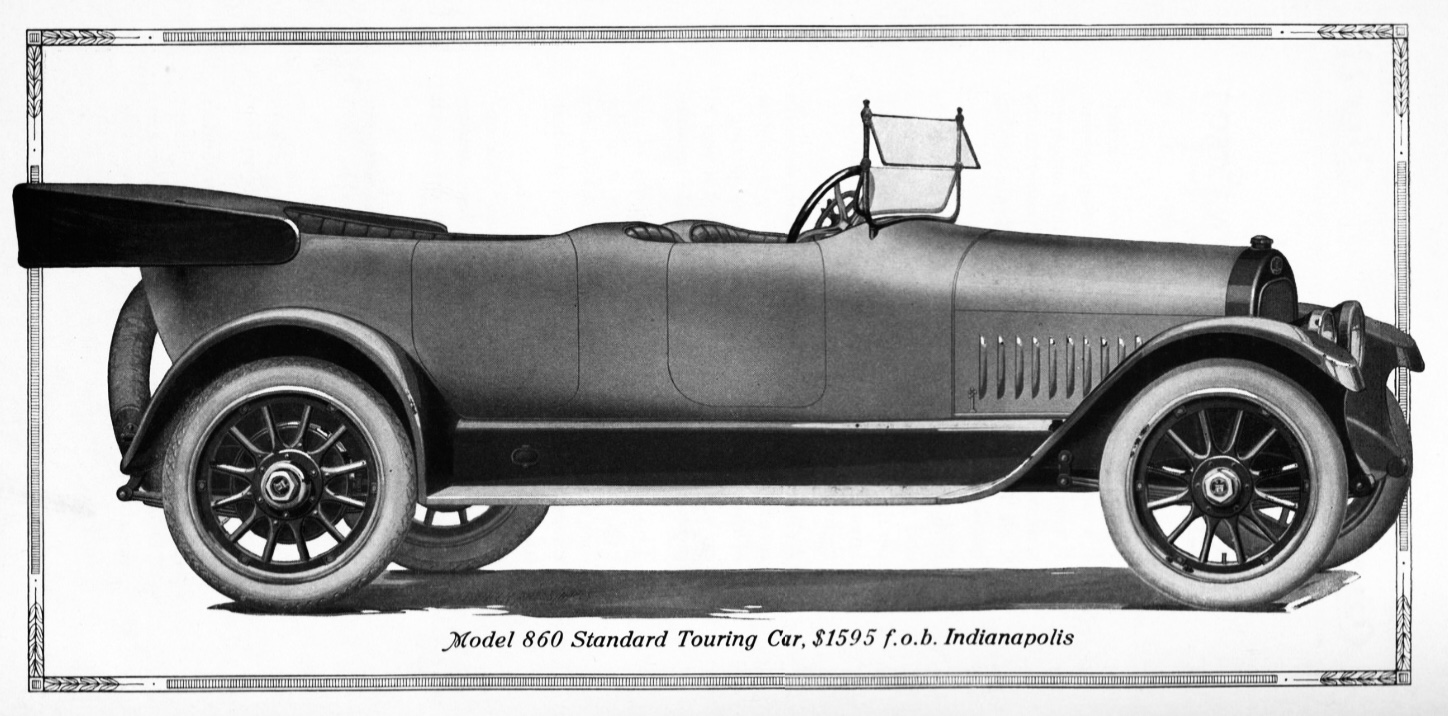
Cole Model 860 (1917–1919)

Big news came in mid-1915: Only one year after Cadillac had pioneered the V8 engine, and about at the same time as the mighty Cunningham V-8 debuted, Cole brought out its own V-8 powered automobile - and would stay with it until the very end of the make, dropping its Fours and Sixes after 1916. This engine had a displacement of 346.3 c.i. and delivered 39.2 HP. It was built by Northway, then a division of General Motors that also manufactured the V-8 for Cadillac. The car was named the Model 8-50. It had a 127-inch (3,200 mm) wheelbase. Five body styles were available at prices between $1,785 and $3,250. Targeted at this level were, of course, Cadillac; Stearns-Knight, who came out with a sleeve-valve V-8 in 1916; or Lozier who drastically reduced its prices to about this level for its last season of existence.

Positioned higher were, among others, the Mercer, the McFarlan, and the Packard, with prices starting at about $3,000; or the Kissel with three full lines of 4- and 6-cylinder cars that were only slightly less expensive.

There were few changes for 1917. The car was now called the Model 860. There were five body styles at about the same price level. Some of them received quite flamboyant designations such as "Tuxedo Roadster", "Tourcoupe", and "Toursedan", of which a "Foredoor Toursedan" existed, probably a 2-door sedan. 4193 Cole automobiles were manufactured in that year.

== Aggressive marketing ==
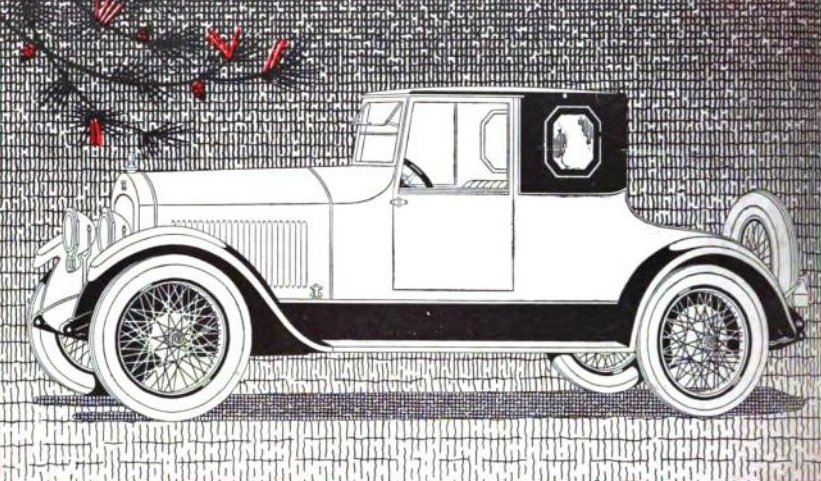
1919 Cole Aero-Eight

The new kind of marketing became even more apparent in 1918. Advertising slogans were "There's a Touch of Tomorrow In All Cole Does Today" or "Did You Ever Go Ballooning in a Cole?", the latter referring to the adoption of balloon tires as an option that year (they became a standard feature finally in 1925). The car was advertised as the "Aero-Eight" (internally Model 870). There were only three body styles left, a roadster, a "Sportster" and the obligatory touring car. They cost $2,395 each and seated 2, 4, and 7 passengers, respectively . The cars also became more fashionably styled.

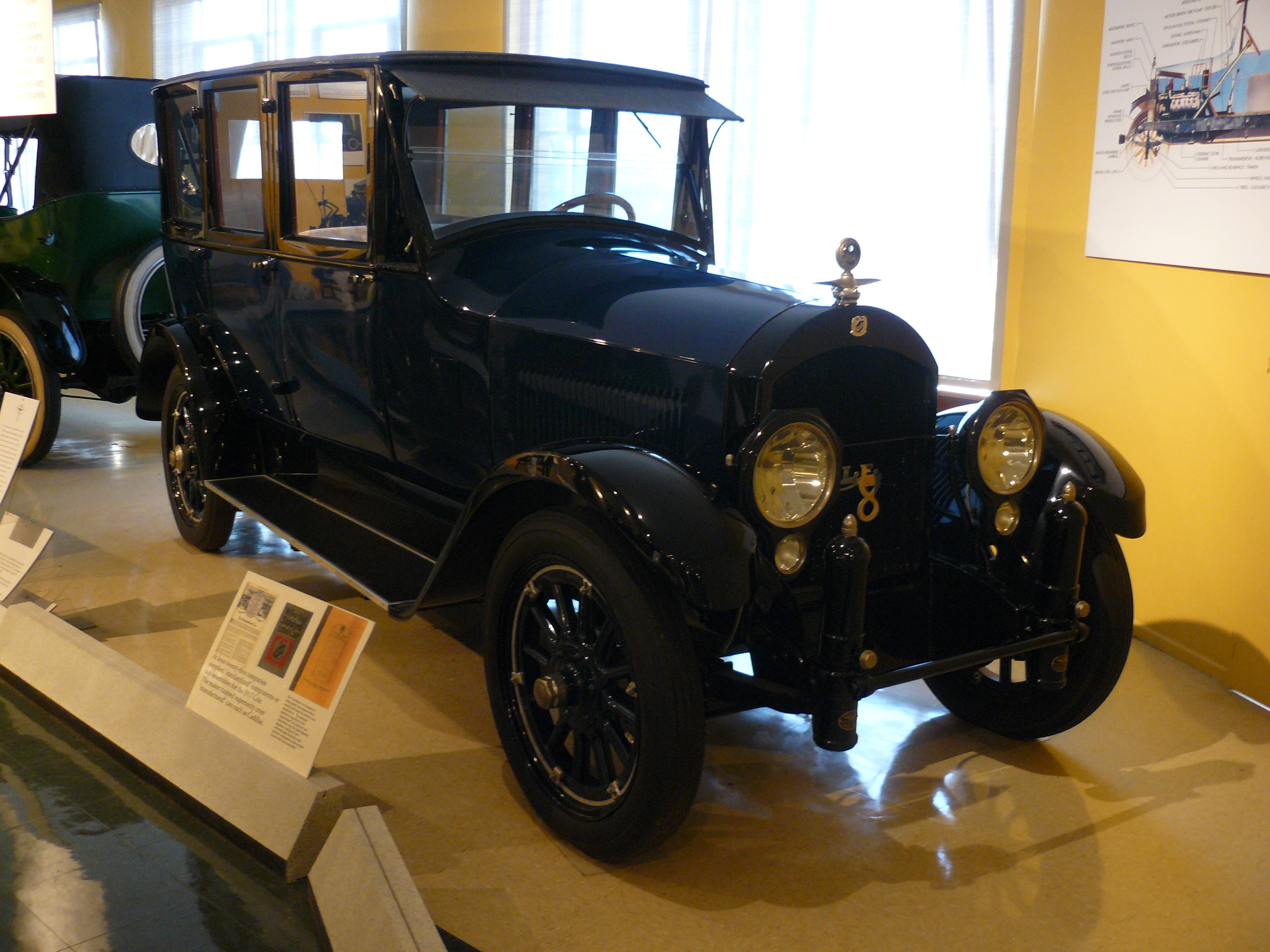
1919 Cole Aero Eight 885 Toursedan.

The 870 Aero-Eight was technically much the same in 1919 but there were now seven bodies to choose from at prices between $2,595 and $3,795 for the new town car and the "Tourcoupe". Some closed bodies got an octagonal rear quarter window as a "beauty" feature. That year, 6,225 Coles were built.

The "Aero-Eight" Model 880 for 1920 was boldly announced: "The Forecast of Future Fashions". The ad further bragged that there were 15,000 miles (24,000 km) possible on its tires. Available were only three body styles, all of them of an open type: A Roadster for 2 and a Speedster for 4 passengers at $2,750 plus a "Tourster" a.k.a. touring car for $2,850. But naming the product got even more creative. While "Sportsedan" and "Sportcoupe" might sound familiar in our ears, "Sportosine" and "Tourosine" for some closed cars definitely do not. These cars got adjustable, "storm-proofed" windshields that had an angled position. Cole switched to Johnson carburettors and introduced a one-piece rear axle and a brake adjuster. The gear ratio was 4.45 (until 1922). A new measure for power replaced the antiquated N.A.C.C. rating. Thus, the Cole V-8 came in with 80 bhp (60 kW) and stayed there until car production ceased. Prices were slightly up and were between $2,750 and $3995.

1921 Coles were only slightly altered. Most of the exalted terms vanished - but "Sportosine" and "Tourosine" remained. There were 8 body styles that were substantially more expensive: $3,250 for the three open cars and between $4,250 and $4,450 for closed.

== Facing the end ==
Cole opened new, wider production facilities in 1922. However, sales went down rapidly, mainly because of a short but severe recession. Although there were more models to choose from and prices were reduced drastically (most to a level under that of 1918 / 1919), only 1,722 cars were built of the Model Aero Eight 890, as the car was called that year. The wheelbase was increased by a quarter inch, and the frame ends were split. The Sportcoupe had a weight of 4,155 pounds (1,885 kg). The car was priced at $3,385 with a 75 mph (121 km/h) speedometer.

Innovations in 1923 for the Series 890 Cole were stylish drum-type headlights, cowl ventilation, and a new windshield with an adjustable upper half on open cars. Other elegant details were wire wheels instead of the previously used "artillery wheels" with fashionable disc wheels on the option list. For this year only, some cars had an added sporty touch with runningboards that did not span the whole length, leaving the chassis-mounted spare wheels "free". Still, with eight types of bodies, prices for open cars were slightly up while those for closed cars remained the same. The most expensive 1922 model, the $4,185 "Tourosine", was gone as were all those strange names, with the exception of the "Sportsedan". Only 1,522 cars left the factory that year.

In this situation and without any debts yet, J. J. Cole decided to liquidate his company rather than risking his fortune by going on. So, it is no wonder that the Model 890, now also called "Master" series, went little changed on the show room floors. Full-length running boards were back on all models. There were seven body styles, again sharply reduced to prices as low as $2,175 for open bodies, $2,750 for a coupe and $3,075 for other closed cars. A Cole was honored to pace that year's Indy 500 race.

Before the curtain finally fell, there were five cars available for 1925. Balloon tires (34" × 7.3") were now standard equipment, and the cars got new two-piece rear bumpers, so-called "bumperettes". Although Joseph Cole began liquidating his firm early in 1925, 607 cars left the factory. He died suddenly of an infection on August 8, 1925, shortly before liquidation was finished.

== Cole model overview, 1908–1925 ==
Year	Model	Engine Type / Cyl.	Power bhp (kW)	Wheelbase in
1909	Model 30	Straight 2 cyl.	14 bhp (10 kW)	90
1910	Series 30	Straight 4 cyl.	30 bhp (22 kW)	108
1911	Series 30	Straight 4 cyl.	30 bhp (22 kW)	118
1912	Forty	Straight 4 cyl.	40 bhp (30 kW)	122
1913	Forty	Straight 4 cyl.	40 bhp (30 kW)	116
1913	Fifty	Straight 4 cyl.	50 bhp (37 kW)	122
1913	Sixty	Straight 6 cyl.	40 bhp (30 kW)	132
1914	Four	Straight 4 cyl.	28.9 bhp (21.6 kW)	120
1914	Six	Straight 6 cyl.	43.8 bhp (32.7 kW)	136
1915	Standard 4-40	Straight 4 cyl.	40 bhp (30 kW)	120
1915	Model 6-50	Straight 6 cyl.	29 bhp (22 kW)	126
1915	Big Six 6-60	Straight 6 cyl.	39.2 bhp (29.2 kW)	127
1916	Model 8-50	V-8 cyl.	39.2 bhp (29.2 kW)	127
1917	Series 860	V-8 cyl.	39.2 bhp (29.2 kW)	127
1918–1919	Series 870	V-8 cyl.	39.2 bhp (29.2 kW)	127
1920–1921	Aero Eight 880	V-8 cyl.	80 bhp (60 kW)	127
1922	Aero Eight 890	V-8 cyl.	80 bhp (60 kW)	127 1/4
1923–1925	Series 890	V-8 cyl.	80 bhp (60 kW)	127 1/4

== Book on the history of Cole ==
In 1954, Howard Russell Delancy completed his college dissertation on the history of the Cole Motor Car Company. Howard was attending Indiana University and the dissertation was turned into a book that had limited publishing. This book is the definitive and very detailed history of the life of J.J. Cole and the entirety of the company. Delancy was given exclusive access to the surviving Cole family members, the Cole company archives, and he interviewed surviving workers from many facets of the company. Unfortunately, decades later, the Cole company history and archives were stored in the basement of the old Cole factory when the river adjacent to the factory flooded. The archives were destroyed, so this book is that much more important for a detailed history of the company.

== Cole Motor Car Club of America ==
The Cole Motor Car Club was an active club of Cole enthusiasts that started in the early 1990s and lasted until the end of 2009, which was the 100th anniversary of the Cole company. The club originally started as just an early Cole registry by Greg Tocket to track the known cars. Later, through the efforts of Tocket, Norm Buckhart, Mel Seitz, and Joe Cole (grandson of J.J. Cole), the registry evolved into the Cole Motor Car Club of America. Early on, Leroy Cole (no relation to the J.J. Cole family) became the chief editor and president of the club until the club ceased operations. He gathered a significant amount of Cole information and history that in 2018 he donated to the Gilmore Car Museum and Research Library.

The club had a newsletter named the Cole Bulletin that was similar to one published by the Cole Motor Car company during its existence. The newsletter included reprints of original Cole documentation. The club also shared information, parts, and a helping hand to keep the surviving Cole cars on the road and running well. The club wound down operations in late 2009 and ceased operations.

== Cole Motor Car Registry ==
In 2018 the Cole Motor Car Registry was revived. Kevin Fleck, founder of the Cole Motor Car Registry, worked with Leroy Cole to transfer a great amount of history and information to the new registry. In October 2018, the registry website was launched to publish information on the company and their cars as well as a registry of known surviving Cole cars. The registry has been tracking down the 75 Cole cars that were identified and found by the former Cole club. The registry has also identified and found two additional Cole cars that were previously unknown. This brings to 77 the number known surviving Cole cars out of the 40,717 cars that were produced during the company's existence. The registry has also been researching and validating history about the Cole Motor Car company and using that to share and publish an accurate history of the company.

== Building on National Register of Historic Places ==
- Cole Motor Car Company
- U.S. National Register of Historic Places
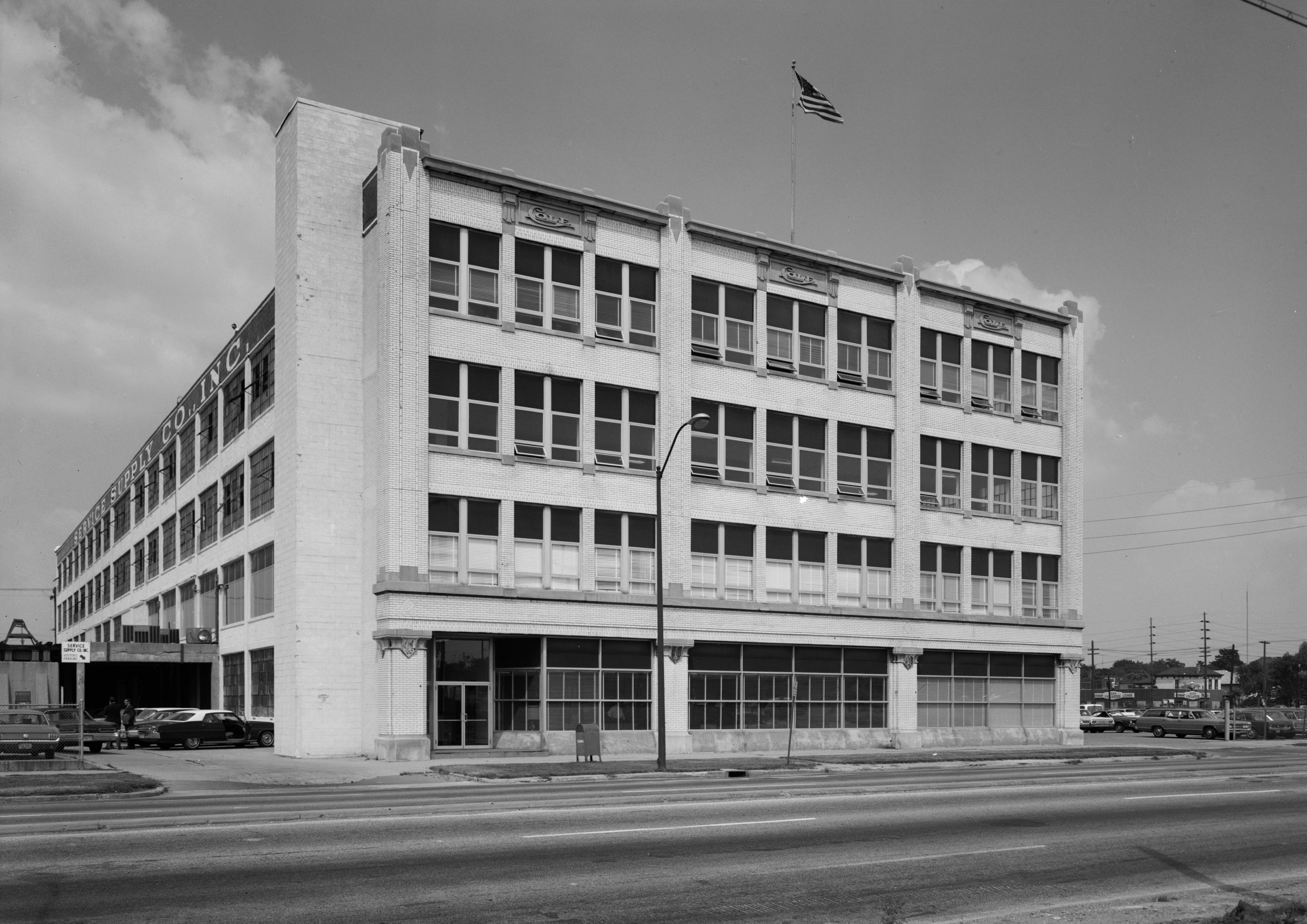

- Location within Indianapolis Location within Indianapolis Location within Indiana Location within the United States
- Location: 730 E. Washington St., Indianapolis, Indiana
- Coordinates: 39°46′2″N 86°8′39″W
- Area: 1.5 acres (0.61 ha)
- Built: 1911–1913
- Built by: Bedford Stone & Construction
- Architect: Halstead, W. C.
- Architectural style: Late 19th And Early 20th Century American Movements, Modern Movement
- NRHP reference No.: 83000128
- Added to NRHP: March 3, 1983

The former Cole Motor Car Company Building, also known as the Service Supply Company, Inc., is located at 730–738 East Washington Street in Indianapolis. It was built between 1911 and 1913, and is a four-story, L-shaped industrial building. The front facade is faced in white ceramic brick and has Art Deco style design elements. It was listed on the National Register of Historic Places in 1983.

== See also ==
- Joseph J. Cole Jr. House and 1925 Cole Brouette No. 70611, the 1924 home of Joseph Cole, also NRHP-listed
