= William N. Thompson House =

Historic house in Indiana, United States

- U.S. National Register of Historic Places
- U.S. Historic district – Contributing property
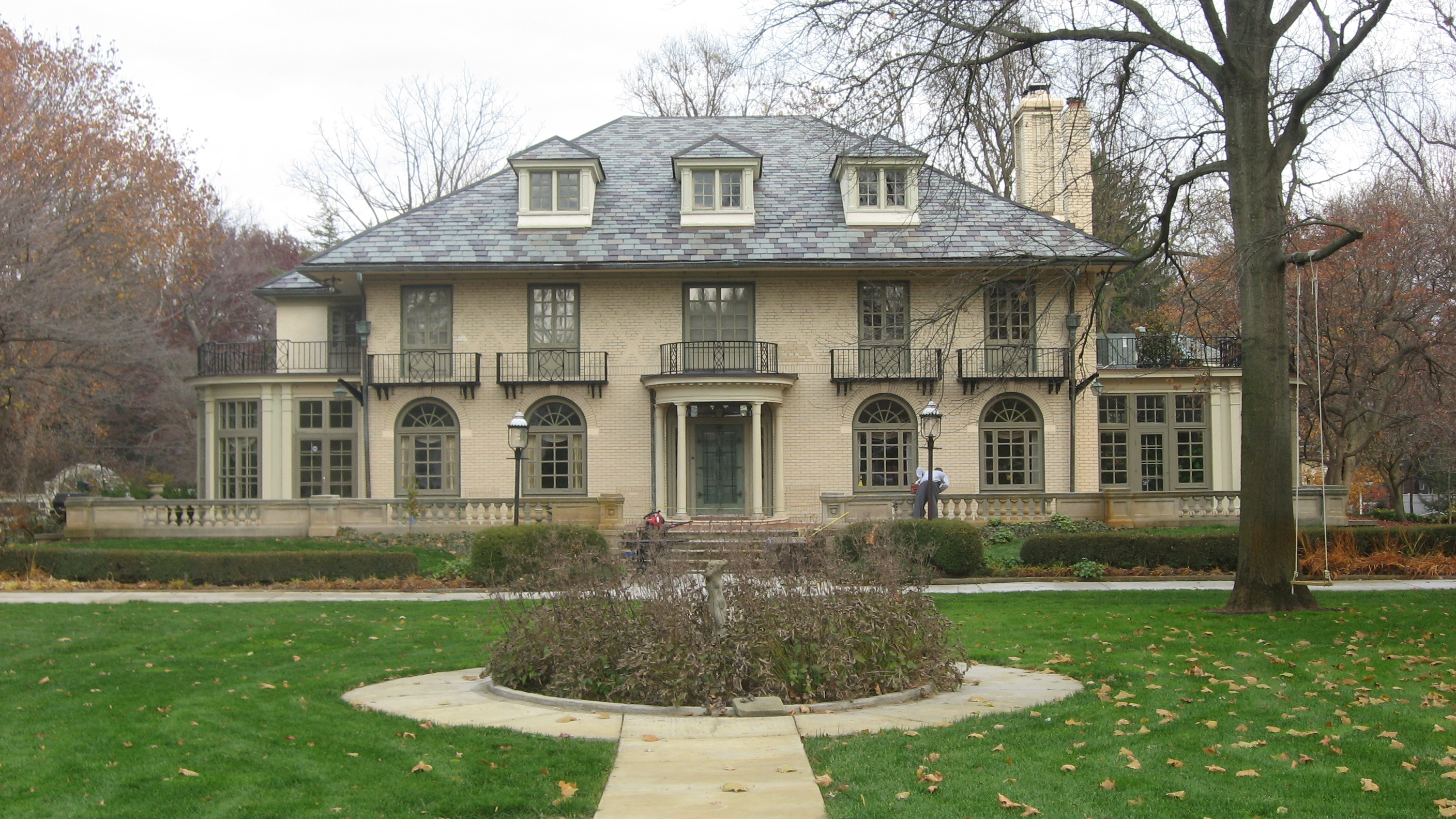
- William N. Thompson House, November 2010

- Location within Indianapolis Location within Indiana Location within the United States
- Location: 4343 N. Meridian St., Indianapolis, Indiana
- Coordinates: 39°50′6″N 86°9′23″W
- Area: 2 acres (0.81 ha)
- Built: 1920
- Architect: Hunter, Frank B.
- Architectural style: Colonial Revival, Georgian Revival
- NRHP reference No.: 82000070
- Added to NRHP: June 1, 1982

William N. Thompson House, also known as Old Governor's Mansion, is a historic home located at Indianapolis, Indiana. It was built in 1920, and is Georgian Revival style buff-colored brick mansion. It consists of a two-story, five-bay, central section flanked by one-story wings. It has a slate hipped roof and features a full-width front porch and an elliptical portico at the main entry. The house served as the Governor's Mansion from 1945 to 1970.

It was added to the National Register of Historic Places in 1982. It is located in the North Meridian Street Historic District.

== See also ==
- National Register of Historic Places listings in Marion County, Indiana
- Indiana Governor's Residence
