= Balmoral Court =

- U.S. National Register of Historic Places
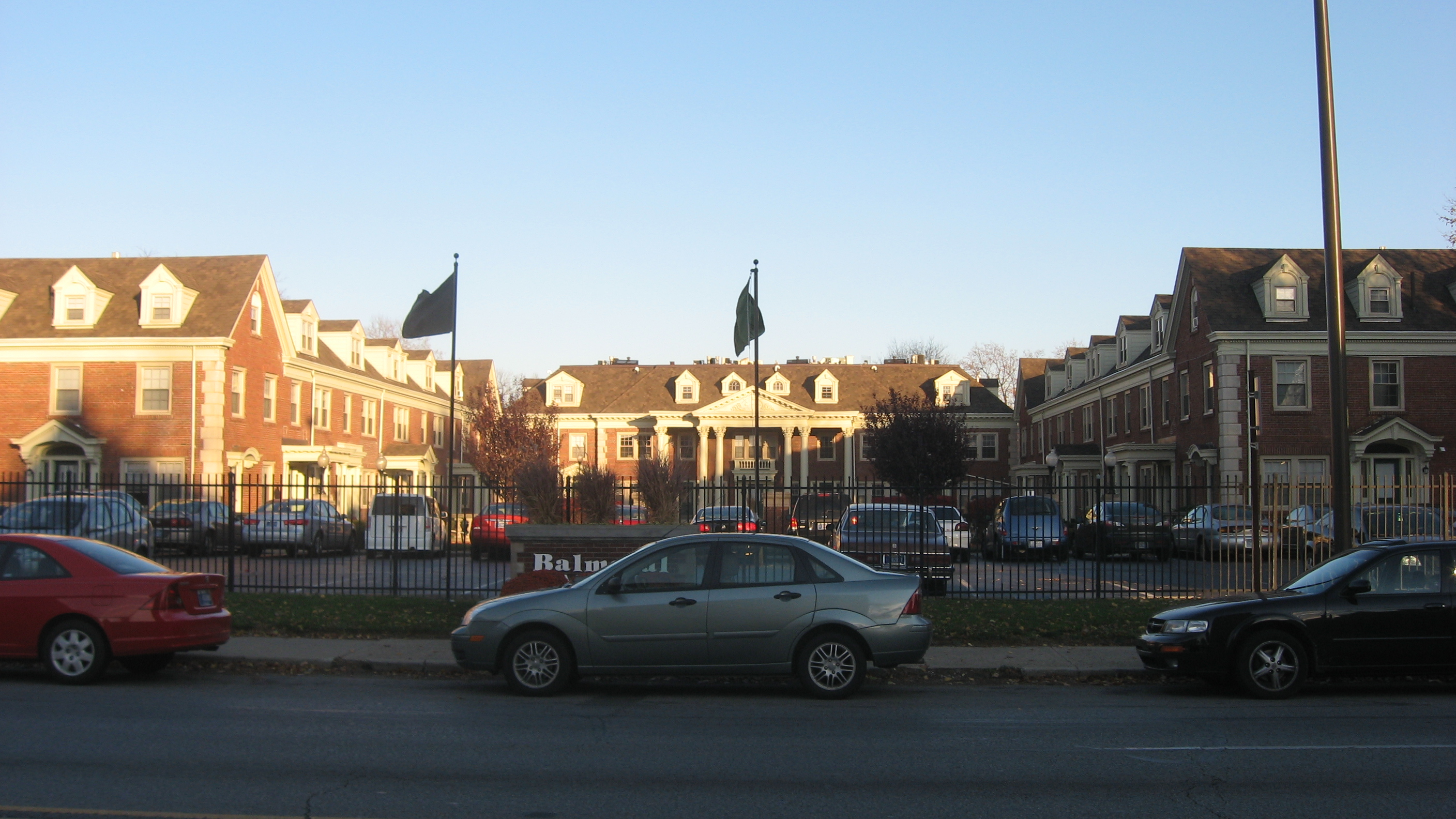
- Balmoral Court, November 2010

- Location within Indianapolis Location within Indiana Location within the United States
- Location: 3055 N. Meridian St., Indianapolis, Indiana
- Coordinates: 39°48′43″N 86°9′22″W
- Area: 1.3 acres (0.53 ha)
- Built: 1916
- Architect: MacLucas, William; Et al.
- Architectural style: Colonial Revival, Georgian Revival
- NRHP reference No.: 92001647
- Added to NRHP: November 27, 1992

Balmoral Court, also known as The Balmoral, is a historic apartment complex located at Indianapolis, Indiana. The complex was built in 1916, and consists of three, 2 1/2-story, Colonial Revival / Georgian Revival style townhouse blocks. The blocks are arranged around a central courtyard and are topped by gable roofs with dormers. The building at the end of the courtyard features a pedimented portico with Corinthian order columns.

It was listed on the National Register of Historic Places in 1992.

== See also ==
- National Register of Historic Places listings in Center Township, Marion County, Indiana
