= General German Protestant Orphans Home =

- U.S. National Register of Historic Places
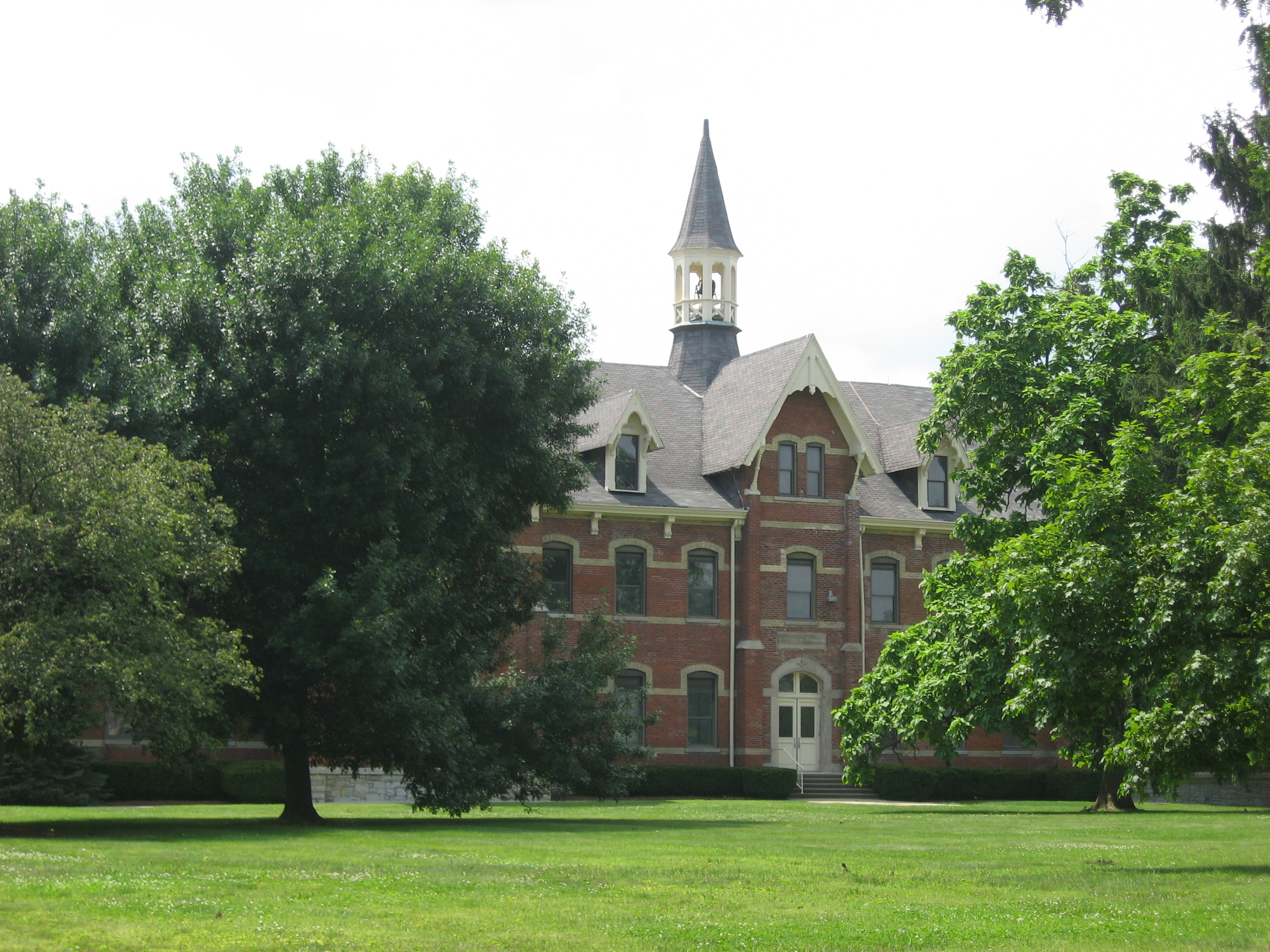
- General German Protestant Orphans Home, July 2011

- Location within Indianapolis Location within Indiana Location within the United States
- Location: 1404 S. State St., Indianapolis, Indiana
- Coordinates: 39°44′53″N 86°7′54″W
- Area: 9.5 acres (3.8 ha)
- Built: 1871
- Architect: Diedrich A. Bohlen
- NRHP reference No.: 84001129
- Added to NRHP: May 17, 1984

General German Protestant Orphans Home, also known as the Pleasant Run Children's Home , is a historic orphanage located in Indianapolis, Indiana. It was designed by architect Diedrich A. Bohlen (1827–1890) and built in 1871–1872. It is a 2 1/2-story brick institutional building on a limestone block foundation. It has eclectic German vernacular detailing and varying roof forms.

It was listed on the National Register of Historic Places in 1984.

== See also ==
- National Register of Historic Places listings in Center Township, Marion County, Indiana
