= Homecroft Historic District =

Historic district in Indiana, United States

- U.S. National Register of Historic Places
- U.S. Historic district
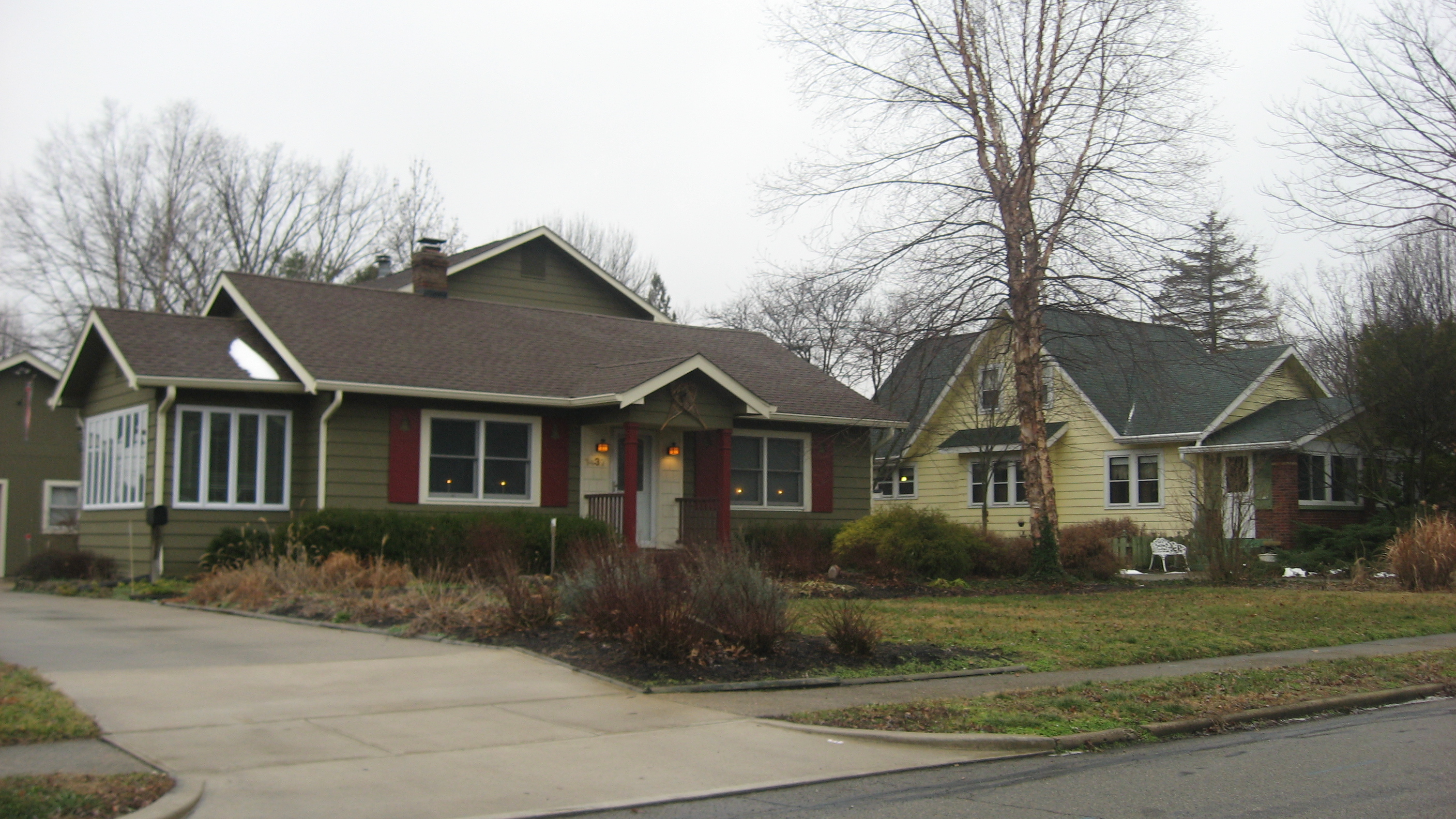
- Houses on Maynard Drive

- Location within Indianapolis Location within Indiana Location within the United States
- Location: Roughly bounded by Madison Ave., Southview Dr., Orinoco Ave., and Banta Rd., Homecroft, Indiana
- Coordinates: 39°40′12″N 86°7′55″W
- Area: 70 acres (28 ha)
- Built by: Gates, Frank
- Architectural style: Bungalow/American Craftsman, Colonial Revival, Tudor Revival
- NRHP reference No.: 95001536
- Added to NRHP: January 11, 1996

The Homecroft Historic District is a national historic district bounded roughly by Madison Avenue, Southview Drive, Orinoco Avenue, and Banta Road in Homecroft, Indiana. It was listed on the National Register of Historic Places in 1996.

== History ==
In 1900, the Indianapolis, Columbus & Southern Interurban Company began service on an interurban rail line extending from downtown Indianapolis to several nearby towns. The line ran along Madison Avenue. In the late 1910s and early 1920s, increasing use of the automobile and public transportation led people to relocate farther from urban centers. The Homecroft site, located 4 1/2 miles (7.2 km) from downtown alongside the Madison Avenue interurban, was a desirable location for relocation.

In 1923, the Frank E. Gates Real Estate Company bought the land and named the area "Homecroft". The firm consisted of Frank Gates and his son Oliver, and they had already developed several subdivisions in Indiana, Ohio, and Michigan.

== Description ==
The Homecroft Historic District is typical of 1920s suburbs built for middle-class families. It consists of 63 structures spread over 70 acres (28 ha). Some of the homes are patterned after model houses built by the Gates Company, while others are based on designs chosen by the original lot buyers. The houses are single-family homes; most are of modest size, one or one-and-a-half stories covered with brick or stone veneer. Architectural styles include Bungalow, American Craftsman, Colonial Revival, and Tudor Revival.

Sidewalks were run through the area in the 1930s by the Works Progress Administration, and the Gates Company planted maples along the streets, which are now mature.

The district has remained cohesive despite the later encroachment of commercial strips along Madison Avenue, and has maintained the feel of a small satellite town.

== See also ==
- National Register of Historic Places listings in Marion County, Indiana
