= Spink Arms Hotel =

- U.S. National Register of Historic Places
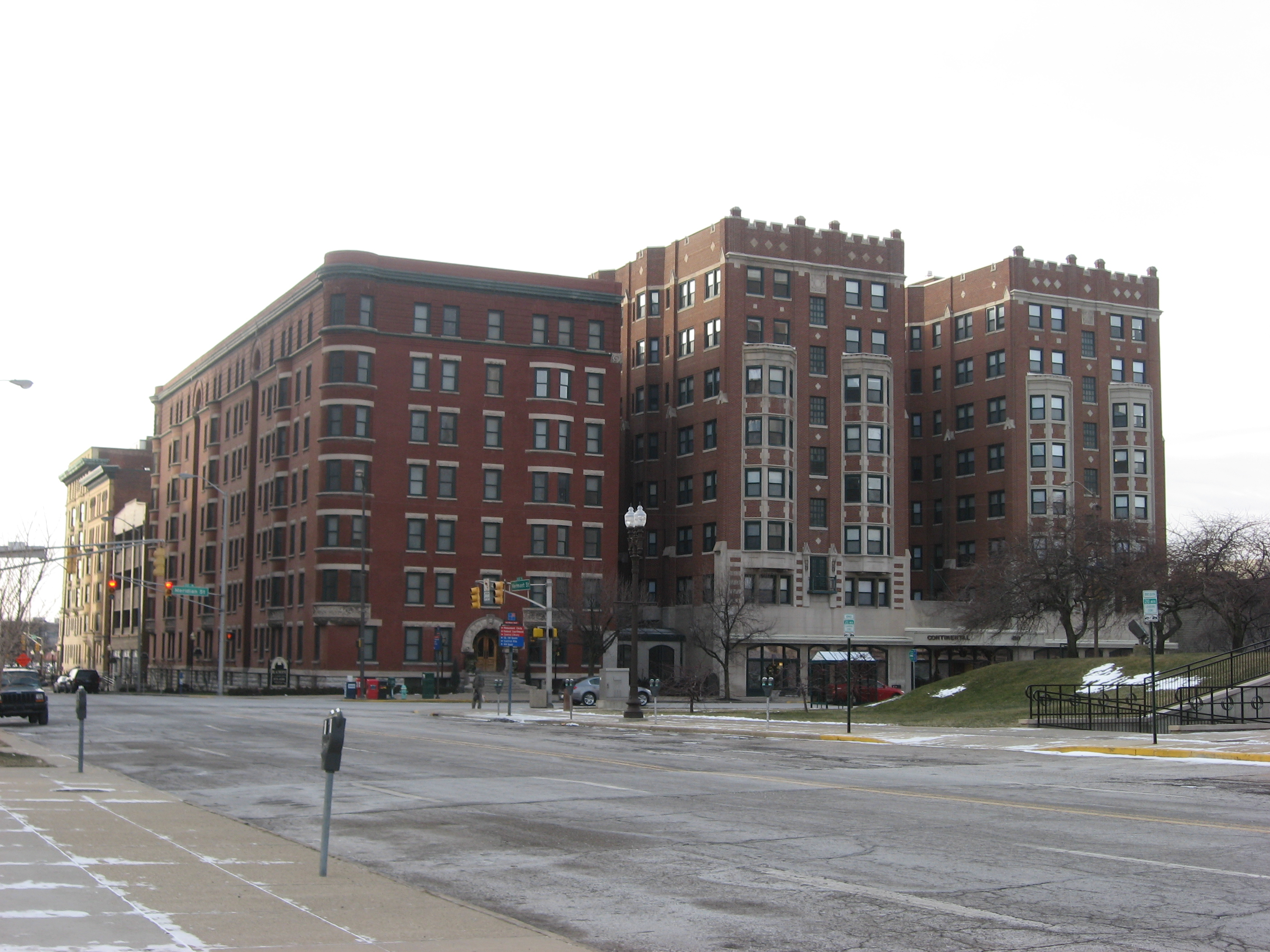
- Spink Arms Hotel, January 2010

- Location within Indianapolis Location within Indianapolis Location within Indiana Location within the United States
- Location: 410 N. Meridian St., Indianapolis, Indiana
- Coordinates: 39°46′14″N 86°9′30″W
- Area: less than one acre
- Built: 1919, 1922
- Architect: Spink, E.G. Co.; Eldridge, William K.
- Architectural style: Tudor Revival
- NRHP reference No.: 01001345
- Added to NRHP: December 7, 2001

Spink Arms Hotel, also known as the Lionel Artis Center, is a historic hotel building located at Indianapolis, Indiana. It was built in 1919, and consists of two eight-story, brick towers linked by a one-story connector. It is in the Tudor Revival style and features twin four-story oriel windows on each tower and a crenellated parapet. Behind the building is a four-story parking garage constructed in 1922.

It was listed on the National Register of Historic Places in 2001.

== See also ==
- National Register of Historic Places listings in Center Township, Marion County, Indiana
