= North Meridian Street Historic District =

Historic district in Indiana, United States

- U.S. National Register of Historic Places
- U.S. Historic district
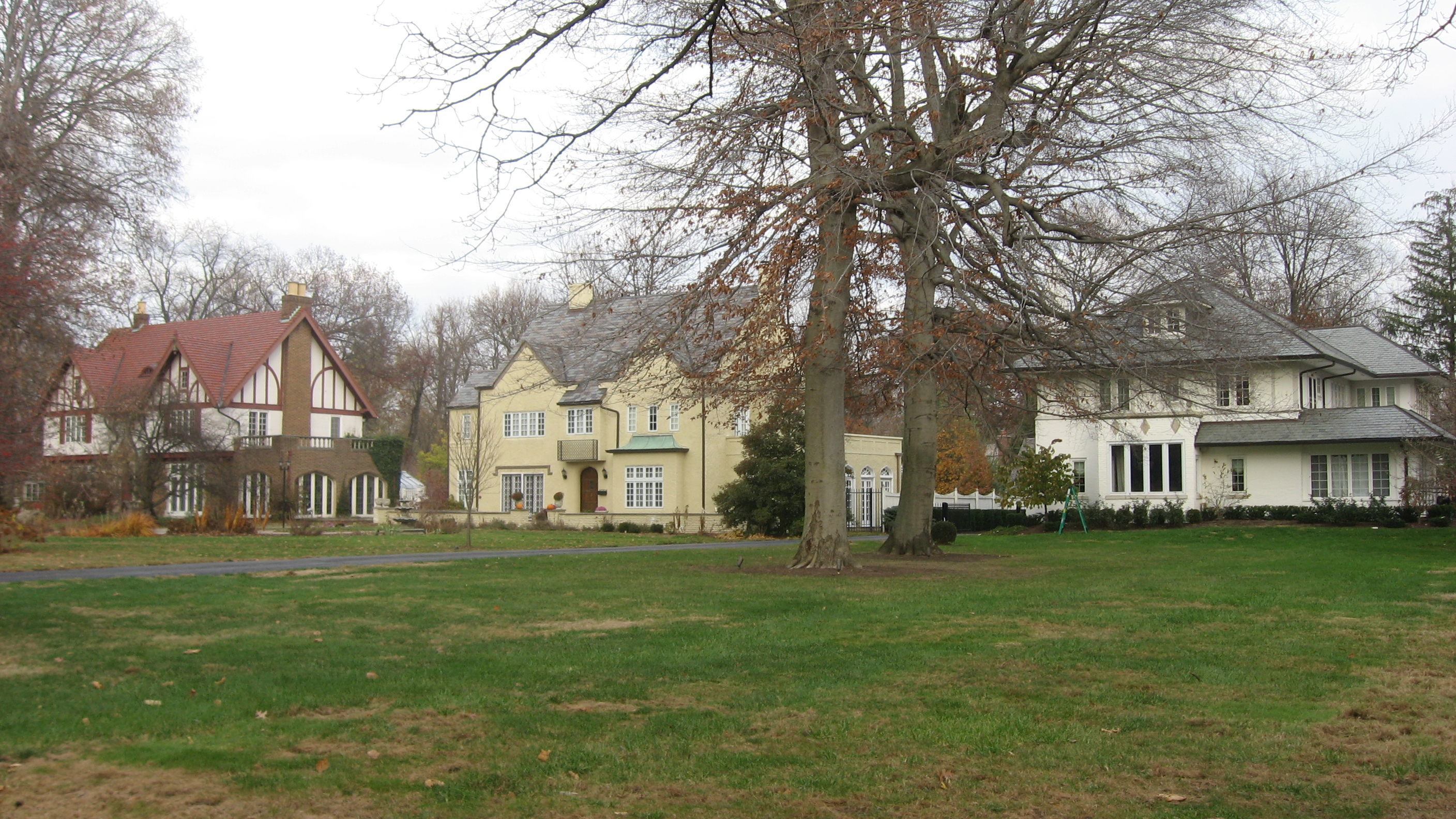
- 4400 block of N. Meridian, November 2011

- Location within Indianapolis Location within Indiana Location within the United States
- Location: 4000-5694 and 4001-5747 N. Meridian St., Indianapolis, Indiana
- Coordinates: 39°50′33″N 86°09′26″W
- Area: 113 acres (46 ha)
- Architect: Bass, Herbert L.; Et al.
- Architectural style: Late 19th And 20th Century Revivals, Prairie School
- NRHP reference No.: 86002695
- Added to NRHP: September 22, 1986

North Meridian Street Historic District is a national historic district in Indianapolis, Indiana, United States. It straddles the neighborhoods of Butler–Tarkington and Meridian–Kessler.

The historic district encompasses 169 contributing buildings in a high style residential section along Meridian Street. The district developed between about 1900 and 1936, and includes representative examples of Tudor Revival, Colonial Revival, and Classical Revival style architecture. Located in the district is the separately listed William N. Thompson House. Other notable contributing resources include the Evan-Blankenbaker House (1901), Sears-Townsend House (1930), MacGill-Wemmer House, Hugh Love House (1930), Hare-Tarkington House (1911), Shea House (1922), and Brant-Weinhardt House (1932).

It was listed on the National Register of Historic Places in 1986.

== See also ==
- National Register of Historic Places listings in Marion County, Indiana
