= Cotton House =

Cotton House may refer to:

Alphabetical by state, then town

- Thomas James Cotton House, Dardanelle, Arkansas, listed on the U.S. National Register of Historic Places (NRHP)
- Dr. J.O. Cotton House, Leslie, Arkansas, NRHP-listed
- Cotton-Ropkey House, Indianapolis, Indiana, NRHP-listed
- Cotton-Smith House, Fairfield, Maine, NRHP-listed
- Dr. Charles Cotton House, Newport, Rhode Island, NRHP-listed
- Cotton House (Green Bay, Wisconsin), NRHP-listed
