= Stewart Manor =

Stewart Manor may refer to:

- Stewart Manor, New York
- Stewart Manor (LIRR station)
- Stewart Manor (Charles B. Sommers House), a historic home in Indianapolis, Marion County, Indiana
