= George Tomlinson =

George Tomlinson may refer to:

- George Tomlinson (British politician) (1890–1952)
- George Tomlinson (bishop) (1794–1863), Anglican bishop of Gibraltar
- George Henry Tomlinson Jr. (1896–1963), Canadian politician

== See also ==
- George Washington Tomlinson House, Indianapolis, Marion County, Indiana
