= Recker =

Surname list

Recker is the surname of the following people

- Anthony Recker (born in 1983), American baseball catcher
- Luke Recker (born in 1978), American basketball player
- Udo Recker (born in 1967), German archaeologist

== See also ==
- Carlos and Anne Recker House, Indianapolis
