= Brendonwood Historic District =

Historic district in Indiana, United States

- U.S. National Register of Historic Places
- U.S. Historic district
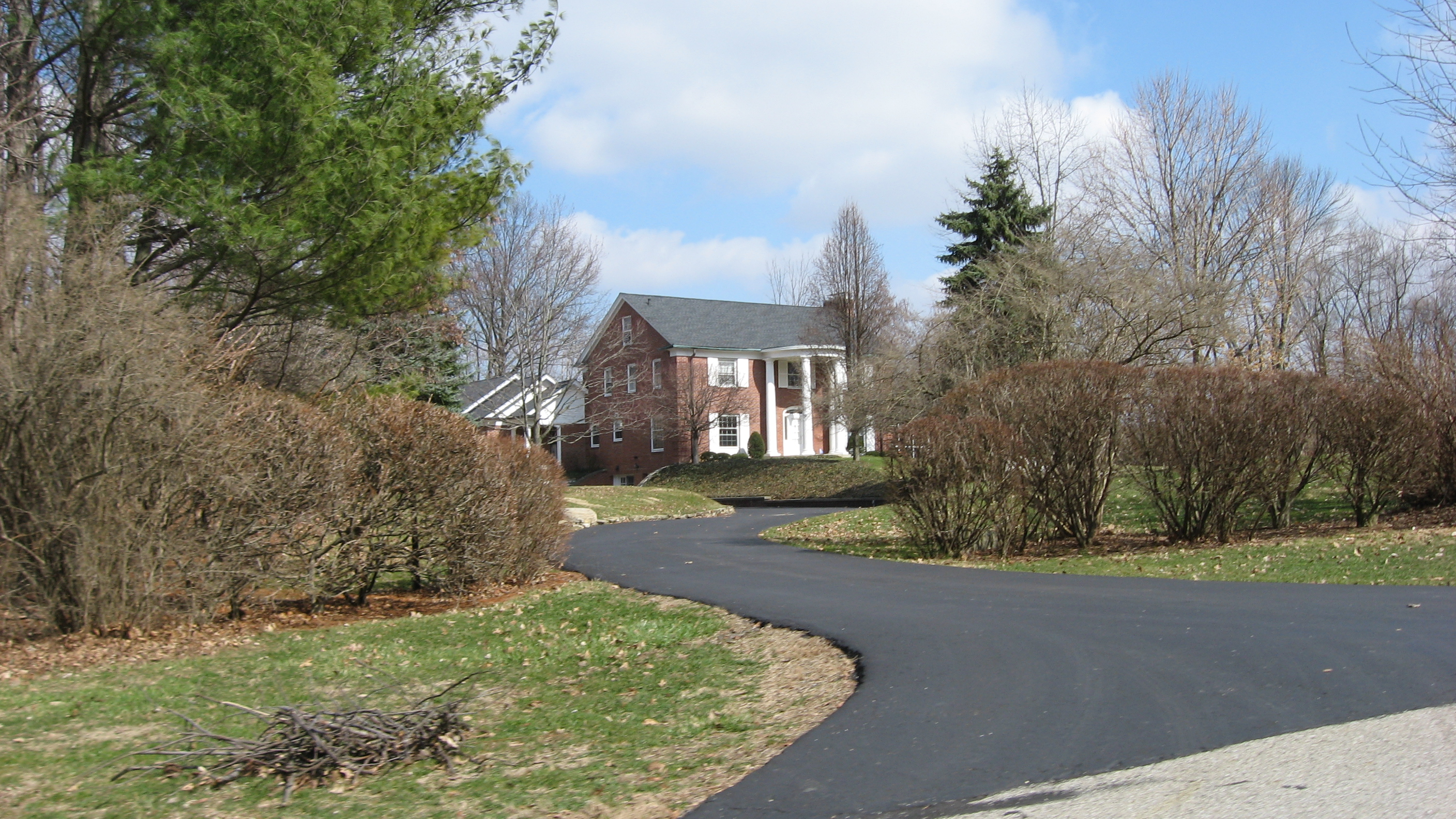
- Lawrence Drive in Brendonwood, March 2011

- Location within Indianapolis Location within Indiana Location within the United States
- Location: Roughly bounded by Fall Creek, 56th St., and Brendon Forest Dr., Indianapolis, Indiana
- Coordinates: 39°51′40″N 86°03′58″W
- Area: 350 acres (140 ha)
- Built: 1917
- Architect: Lewis, Charles S.; et.al.
- Architectural style: Late 19th And 20th Century Revivals, Late 19th And Early 20th Century American Movements
- NRHP reference No.: 04001313
- Added to NRHP: December 6, 2004

Brendonwood Historic District, also known as Brendonwood Common, is a national historic district located at Indianapolis, Indiana. It encompasses 85 contributing buildings, 2 contributing sites, and 1 contributing object in a planned suburban residential section of Indianapolis. 350 acres on the eastern edge of Millersville with Fall Creek as the western boundary was the vision of Charles S. Lewis for a self-regulated residential zone of 110 plots. Noted landscape architect George E. Kessler was hired to develop the planned community. The district developed between about 1917 and 1954, and includes representative examples of Tudor Revival, Colonial Revival, and Bungalow / American Craftsman style architecture. Notable contributing resources include the Common House (1924), golf course, Two Knolls (1951–1952), Farlook (1939), Springhead (1934), Dearwald (1927), Wancroft (1940), Larkwing (1952), Grasmere (1937–1938), Wetermain (1921), Whispering Trees (1952–1953), Glen Gate (1922–1923), Witching View (1928–1929), Long Ridge (1923–1924) and Great Maple (1948).

It was listed on the National Register of Historic Places in 2004.

== See also ==
- National Register of Historic Places listings in Marion County, Indiana
