= Aston Inn =

Historic inn in Indiana, United States

- U.S. National Register of Historic Places
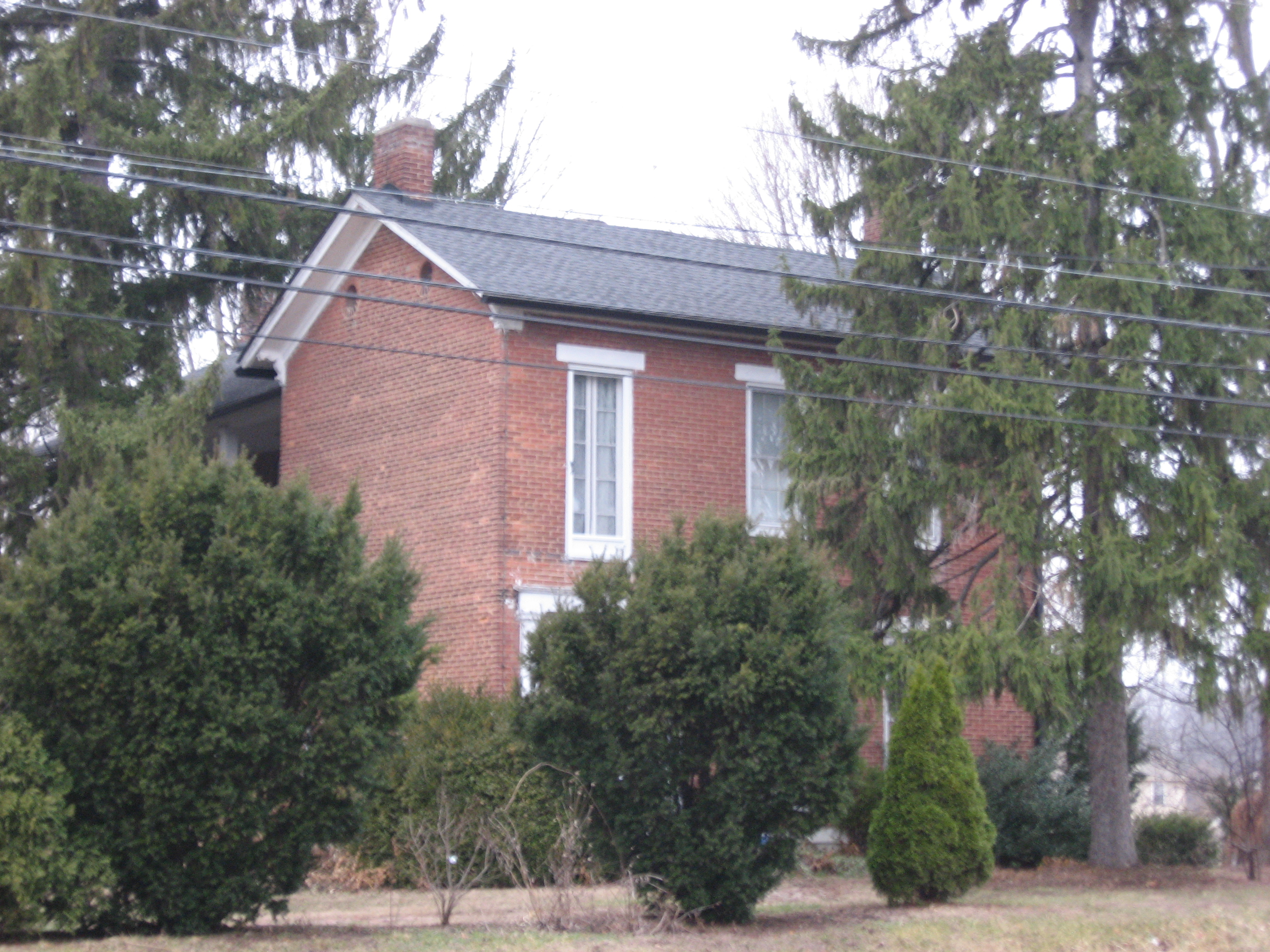
- Aston Inn, November 2010

- Location within Indianapolis Location within Indiana Location within the United States
- Location: 6620 N. Michigan Rd., Indianapolis, Indiana
- Coordinates: 39°52′39″N 86°11′41″W
- Area: 1.8 acres (0.73 ha)
- Built: 1852
- Architect: Aston, George W.
- Architectural style: Greek Revival
- NRHP reference No.: 85003125
- Added to NRHP: December 26, 1985

Aston Inn, also known as the Ratner Residence, is a historic inn located at Indianapolis, Indiana. It was built in 1852, and is a two-story, Greek Revival style brick dwelling with an early one-story addition. It has a side gable roof and features a two-story gallery on the south elevation. The house was used as a stagecoach stop for a short period in the 1850s.

It was added to the National Register of Historic Places in 1985.

== See also ==
- National Register of Historic Places listings in Marion County, Indiana
