= Christamore House =

- U.S. National Register of Historic Places
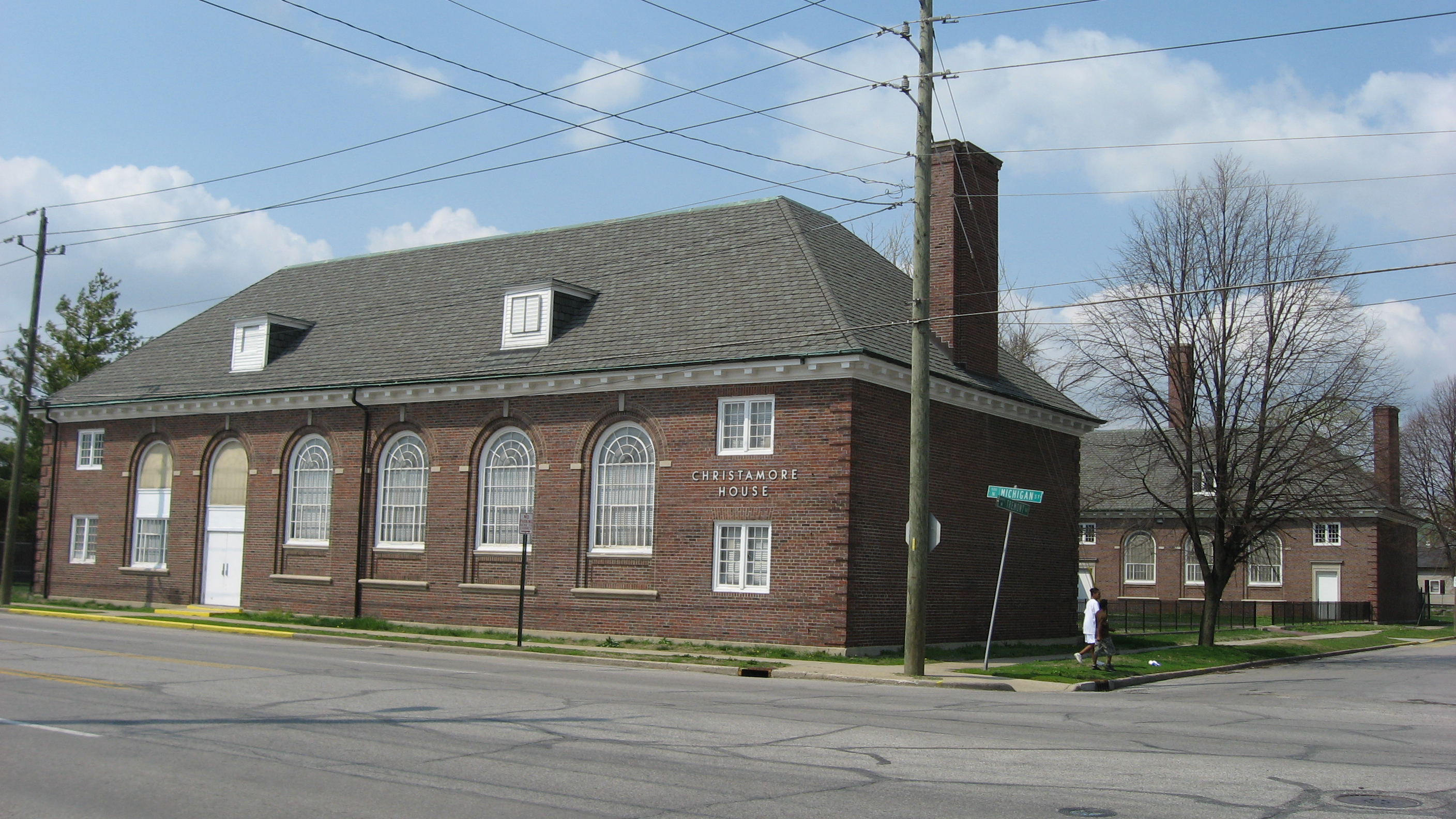
- Christamore House, April 2011

- Location within Indianapolis Location within Indiana Location within the United States
- Location: 502 N. Tremont St., Indianapolis, Indiana
- Coordinates: 39°46′29″N 86°12′4″W
- Area: 1.1 acres (0.45 ha)
- Built: 1924-1926
- Built by: Brown, Eugene H.
- Architect: Russ, Willam Earl
- Architectural style: Colonial Revival, Georgian Revival
- NRHP reference No.: 85000597
- Added to NRHP: March 21, 1985

Christamore House is a historic settlement house associated with Butler University and located at Indianapolis, Indiana. It was built between 1924 and 1926, and is 2 1/2-story, U-shaped, Georgian Revival style brick mansion. It consists of a two-story, five-bay, central section flanked by one-story wings. It has a slate hipped roof and is nine bays wide, with a three-bay central pavilion. The building features large round-arched windows and contains an auditorium and a gymnasium.

It was added to the National Register of Historic Places in 1985.

== See also ==
- National Register of Historic Places listings in Marion County, Indiana
