= National Register of Historic Places listings in Marion County, Indiana =

Location of Marion County in Indiana

This is a list of the National Register of Historic Places listings in Marion County, Indiana.

This is intended to be a complete list of the properties and districts on the National Register of Historic Places in Marion County, Indiana, United States. Latitude and longitude coordinates are provided for many National Register properties and districts; these locations may be seen together in a map.

There are 272 properties and districts listed on the National Register in the county, including nine National Historic Landmarks. Because Indianapolis is coextensive with Marion County, properties are listed by township rather than by city or town. Center Township is the location of 193 of these properties and districts, including six of the National Historic Landmarks; these properties and districts are listed separately. Properties and districts in Marion County's other townships are listed here. One district, the Indianapolis Park and Boulevard System, is primarily in Center Township but extends into three other townships, and is therefore included on both lists. Nine other properties, including seven in Center Township, were once listed but have since been removed.

This National Park Service list is complete through NPS recent listings posted August 7, 2026.

== Current listings ==
	Name on the Register	Image	Date listed	Location	Township	Description
1	Administration Building, Indiana Central University	Administration Building, Indiana Central University	March 15, 1984 (#84001081)	Otterbein and Hanna Ave. 39°42′29″N 86°08′07″W	Perry	
2	Allison Mansion	Allison Mansion	December 18, 1970 (#70000006)	3200 Cold Spring Rd. 39°49′00″N 86°12′06″W	Wayne	
3	Anderson–Thompson House	Anderson–Thompson House	March 26, 1987 (#87000502)	6551 Shelbyville Rd. 39°40′02″N 86°03′09″W	Franklin	
4	Christopher Apple House	Christopher Apple House	September 17, 1980 (#80000055)	11663 Pendleton Pike; 39°52′12″N 85°57′34″W	Lawrence	
5	Archeological Sites 12Ma648 and 12Ma649	Archeological Sites 12Ma648 and 12Ma649	December 20, 2011 (#11000912)	Atop a hill above Fall Creek in the northwestern corner of Fort Harrison State Park; 39°52′31″N 86°01′52″W	Lawrence	
6	Thomas Askren House	Thomas Askren House	April 19, 2006 (#06000303)	6550 E. 16th St. 39°47′28″N 86°03′12″W	Warren	
7	Aston Inn	Aston Inn	December 26, 1985 (#85003125)	6620 N. Michigan Rd. 39°52′39″N 86°12′24″W	Washington	
8	Benton House	Benton House	March 20, 1973 (#73000034)	312 S. Downey Ave. 39°45′54″N 86°04′35″W	Warren	Part of the Irvington Historic District
9	Big Run Baptist Church and Cemetery	Big Run Baptist Church and Cemetery	December 6, 2005 (#05001367)	6510 S. Franklin Rd. 39°40′33″N 86°01′08″W	Franklin	
10	Joseph J. Bingham Indianapolis Public School No. 84	Joseph J. Bingham Indianapolis Public School No. 84	December 6, 2004 (#04001310)	440 E. 57th St.-5702 Central Ave. 39°51′34″N 86°09′05″W	Washington	
11	Bluff Road Historic District		September 1, 2023 (#100009292)	Roughly on both sides of Bluff Rd. from Sprague St. to 4724 Bluff Rd. 39°41′41″N 86°10′23″W	Perry	
12	Brendonwood Historic District	Brendonwood Historic District	December 6, 2004 (#04001313)	Roughly bounded by Fall Creek, 56th St., and Brendon Forest Dr. 39°51′40″N 86°03′58″W	Lawrence	
13	Broad Ripple Firehouse–Indianapolis Fire Department Station 32	Broad Ripple Firehouse–Indianapolis Fire Department Station 32	September 15, 2011 (#11000658)	6330 Guilford Ave. 39°52′15″N 86°08′35″W	Washington	
14	Butler Fieldhouse	Butler Fieldhouse	December 22, 1983 (#83003573)	Butler University campus, 49th St., and Boulevard Pl. 39°50′36″N 86°10′02″W	Washington	
15	Camp Edwin F. Glenn	Camp Edwin F. Glenn	December 1, 1995 (#95001360)	Fort Benjamin Harrison; 39°51′34″N 86°01′16″W	Lawrence	
16	Henry F. Campbell Mansion	Henry F. Campbell Mansion	April 14, 1997 (#97000305)	2550 Cold Spring Rd. 39°48′07″N 86°12′19″W	Wayne	
17	Christamore House	Christamore House	March 21, 1985 (#85000597)	502 N. Tremont St. 39°46′29″N 86°12′04″W	Wayne	
18	Henry P. Coburn Public School No. 66	Henry P. Coburn Public School No. 66	June 13, 1986 (#86001267)	604 E. 38th St. 39°46′30″N 86°12′04″W	Washington	
19	Joseph J. Cole Jr. House	Joseph J. Cole Jr. House	June 25, 1997 (#97000599)	4909 N. Meridian St. 39°50′35″N 86°09′24″W	Washington	
20	Roy and Iris Corbin Lustron House	Roy and Iris Corbin Lustron House	October 9, 1997 (#97001173)	1728 N. Leland Ave. 39°47′26″N 86°04′55″W	Warren	
21	Cumberland Historic District	Cumberland Historic District	December 7, 2001 (#01001341)	Roughly bounded by Munsie, Welland, Heflin, and Warehouse Sts. 39°46′36″N 85°57′23″W	Warren	
22	Emerson Avenue Addition Historic District	Emerson Avenue Addition Historic District	December 19, 2012 (#12001063)	Roughly bounded by E. Michigan and E. St Clair Sts., N. Emerson Ave., and Ellenberger Park; 39°46′37″N 86°04′52″W	Warren	
23	Floral Park Cemetery		March 2, 2026 (#100012762)	425 North Holt Road; 39°46′21″N 86°13′41″W	Wayne	
24	Forebears	Forebears	February 27, 2023 (#100008662)	4849 Buttonwood Crescent; 39°50′34″N 86°11′01″W	Washington	
25	Forest Hills Historic District	Forest Hills Historic District	June 30, 1983 (#83000130)	Bounded by the Monon Railroad tracks, Kessler Boulevard, and College and Northview Aves. 39°51′32″N 86°08′35″W	Washington	
26	Fort Benjamin Harrison Historic District	Fort Benjamin Harrison Historic District	September 6, 1995 (#93001581)	E. 56th St.; also roughly bounded by Shafter Rd., Aultman Ave., and Glenn Rd. 39°51′34″N 86°00′46″W	Lawrence	Second set of boundaries represents a boundary increase of December 1, 1995
27	Fort Harrison Terminal Station	Fort Harrison Terminal Station	March 16, 1984 (#84001127)	Building 616 at Fort Benjamin Harrison; 39°51′21″N 86°00′48″W	Lawrence	
28	Foster Hall	Foster Hall	December 6, 2005 (#05001364)	7200 N. College Ave. 39°53′19″N 86°08′51″W	Washington	
29	William H.H. Graham House	William H.H. Graham House	July 15, 1982 (#82001857)	5432 University Ave. 39°46′00″N 86°04′31″W	Warren	
30	Hannah–Oehler–Elder House	Hannah–Oehler–Elder House	December 1, 1978 (#78000046)	3801 Madison Ave. 39°42′41″N 86°08′36″W	Perry	
31	Haughville Historic District	Haughville Historic District	December 9, 1992 (#92001652)	Roughly bounded by 10th St., Belleview Pl., Walnut St., and Concord St. 39°46′40″N 86°12′22″W	Wayne	
32	Hiram A. Haverstick Farmstead	Hiram A. Haverstick Farmstead	December 26, 1985 (#85003126)	7845 Westfield Boulevard; 39°53′48″N 86°08′09″W	Washington	
33	Hawthorne Branch Library No. 2	Hawthorne Branch Library No. 2	May 18, 2000 (#00000499)	70 N. Mount St. 39°46′03″N 86°12′06″W	Wayne	
34	Highland Golf and Country Club	Highland Golf and Country Club	September 29, 2004 (#100007174)	1050 West 52nd St. 39°50′48″N 86°11′16″W	Washington	
35	Hillcrest Country Club	Hillcrest Country Club	September 29, 2004 (#04001099)	6098 Fall Creek Rd. 39°52′25″N 86°03′40″W	Lawrence	
36	Hollingsworth House	Hollingsworth House	April 13, 1977 (#77000019)	6054 Hollingsworth Rd. 39°51′51″N 86°14′50″W	Pike	
37	Homecroft Historic District	Homecroft Historic District	January 11, 1996 (#95001536)	Roughly bounded by Madison Ave., Southview Dr., Orinoco Ave., and Banta Rd. 39°40′12″N 86°07′55″W	Perry	
38	Indiana School for the Deaf	Indiana School for the Deaf	June 27, 1991 (#91000790)	1200 E. 42nd St. 39°50′06″N 86°08′16″W	Washington	
39	Indianapolis Motor Speedway	Indianapolis Motor Speedway	March 7, 1975 (#75000044)	4790 W. 16th St. 39°47′54″N 86°13′58″W	Wayne	
40	Indianapolis Park and Boulevard System	Indianapolis Park and Boulevard System	March 28, 2003 (#03000149)	Roughly bounded by 38th St., Emerson, Southern and Tibbs Aves., extending along Fall Creek and Pleasant Run Parkways to Shadeland; 39°47′25″N 86°08′38″W	Lawrence, Warren, and Washington	Extends into Center Township
41	Indianapolis Veterans Administration Hospital	Indianapolis Veterans Administration Hospital	February 21, 2012 (#12000029)	2601 Cold Spring Rd. 39°48′10″N 86°12′06″W	Wayne	
42	Irvington Historic District	Irvington Historic District	May 29, 1987 (#87001031)	Roughly bounded by Ellenberger Park, Pleasant Run Creek, Arlington Ave., the former Baltimore and Ohio railroad tracks, and Emerson Ave. 39°46′13″N 86°04′25″W	Warren	
43	Irvington Terrace Historic District	Irvington Terrace Historic District	December 19, 2011 (#11000913)	Roughly bounded by E. Washington St., Pleasant Run Parkway, N. Arlington Ave., and the eastern side of N. Irwin St. 39°46′21″N 86°03′46″W	Warren	
44	Jamieson–Bennett House	Jamieson–Bennett House	September 16, 2001 (#01000984)	8452 Green Braes North Dr. 39°50′55″N 86°18′48″W	Pike	
45	Oliver Johnson's Woods Historic District	Oliver Johnson's Woods Historic District	June 22, 2004 (#04000632)	Roughly bounded by Central and College Aves. and 44th and 46th Sts. 39°50′23″N 86°08′51″W	Washington	
46	Johnson–Denny House	Johnson–Denny House	August 24, 1979 (#79000036)	4456 N. Park Ave. 39°50′15″N 86°08′55″W	Washington	
47	Arthur Jordan Memorial Hall	Arthur Jordan Memorial Hall	June 30, 1983 (#83000134)	4600 Sunset Ave. 39°50′19″N 86°10′20″W	Washington	
48	Julian–Clark House	Julian–Clark House	June 20, 1986 (#86001335)	115 S. Audubon Rd. 39°46′07″N 86°04′11″W	Warren	
49	Howard J. & Martha Lacy Mansion		June 1, 2026 (#100013069)	4333 Sylvan Road; 39°50′05″N 86°12′51″W		
50	Ladywood Estates		December 2, 2019 (#100004728)	Roughly bounded by the 5200 blk. of Emerson Way, Ladywood Dr. & the hill west of Nob Ln. 39°50′55″N 86°05′11″W	Washington	
51	Laurel Hall		May 28, 2026 (#100013068)	5395 Emerson Way; 39°51′04″N 86°05′00″W		
52	Donald M. Mattison House	Donald M. Mattison House	May 19, 2022 (#100007737)	4821 Buttonwood Crescent; 39°50′32″N 86°11′01″W	Washington	
53	Marcy Village Apartments	Marcy Village Apartments	March 24, 2004 (#04000202)	4440-4567 Marcy Ln. and 1401 E. 46th St. 39°50′19″N 86°08′04″W	Washington	
54	Marion County Bridge 0501F	Marion County Bridge 0501F	September 20, 2006 (#06000853)	86th and 82nd Sts. over the White River; 39°54′43″N 86°06′17″W	Washington	
55	Michigan Road Toll House	Michigan Road Toll House	August 7, 1974 (#74000031)	4702 Michigan Rd., NW. 39°50′29″N 86°11′20″W	Washington	
56	New Augusta Historic District	New Augusta Historic District	July 12, 1989 (#89000780)	Roughly E. 71st St., E. 74th St., Coffman Rd., and New Augusta Rd. 39°53′02″N 86°14′19″W	Pike	
57	Nicholson–Rand House	Nicholson–Rand House	June 22, 2003 (#03000542)	5010 W. Southport Rd. 39°39′38″N 86°14′46″W	Decatur	American Gothic Revival Farmhouse built 1876
58	North Irvington Gardens Historic District	North Irvington Gardens Historic District	June 27, 2008 (#08000557)	Roughly bounded by 11th, 10th, Pleasant Run Golf Course, Arlington Ave., Pleasant Run Parkway N. Drive, and Ritter Ave. 39°46′46″N 86°04′15″W	Warren	
59	North Meridian Street Historic District	North Meridian Street Historic District	September 22, 1986 (#86002695)	4000-5694 and 4001-5747 N. Meridian St. 39°50′33″N 86°09′26″W	Washington	
60	North Pennsylvania Street Historic District	North Pennsylvania Street Historic District	December 11, 2023 (#100009591)	Roughly bound by Westfield Boulevard on the north, the east side of New Jersey Street on the east, 46th Street on the south, and the west side of Pennsylvania Street on the west 39°50′48″N 86°09′26″W	Washington	
61	Oaklandon Historic District	Oaklandon Historic District	September 18, 2013 (#13000724)	6300 and 6400 blocks of Oaklandon Rd., the 6400 block of Maple St., and 11716 Oshawa St. 39°52′30″N 85°57′26″W	Lawrence	
62	Old Pathology Building	Old Pathology Building	April 25, 1972 (#72000011)	3000 W. Washington St. (Central State Hospital); 39°46′12″N 86°12′48″W	Wayne	
63	Old Southport High School	Old Southport High School	September 28, 2003 (#03000982)	6548 Orinoco Ave. 39°40′17″N 86°08′09″W	Perry	
64	Oldfields	Oldfields	June 15, 2000 (#00000676)	1200 W. 38th St. 39°49′32″N 86°10′58″W	Washington	Declared a National Historic Landmark District on July 31, 2003
65	Pleasanton in Irvington Historic District	Pleasanton in Irvington Historic District	December 27, 2010 (#10001083)	Roughly bounded by E. Michigan St., Pleasant Run Parkway North Dr., and Emerson Ave. 39°46′32″N 86°04′53″W	Warren	
66	Carlos and Anne Recker House	Carlos and Anne Recker House	June 13, 1996 (#96000601)	59 N. Hawthorne Ln. 39°46′19″N 86°04′41″W	Warren	
67	St. Timothy’s Episcopal Church	St. Timothy’s Episcopal Church	December 2, 2020 (#100005873)	2601 East Thompson Rd. 39°41′35″N 86°07′01″W	Perry	
68	Speedway Historic District	Speedway Historic District	September 15, 2005 (#05001015)	Roughly bounded by 16th St., Main St., 10th St., and Winton Ave. 39°47′02″N 86°14′38″W	Wayne	
69	Stewart Manor (Charles B. Sommers House)	Stewart Manor (Charles B. Sommers House)	October 8, 1976 (#76000033)	3650 Cold Spring Rd. 39°49′14″N 86°12′10″W	Wayne	
70	Stout Field, Administration Building		May 30, 2018 (#100002491)	Address Restricted	Wayne	
71	Stout Field, Hangar		May 30, 2018 (#100002493)	Address Restricted	Wayne	
72	George Stumpf House	George Stumpf House	May 14, 1979 (#79000039)	3225 S. Meridian St. 39°43′06″N 86°09′29″W	Perry	
73	William N. Thompson House	William N. Thompson House	June 1, 1982 (#82000070)	4343 N. Meridian St. 39°50′06″N 86°09′23″W	Washington	
74	Tobey-Normington House		August 24, 2022 (#100008057)	6090 Fall Creek Rd. 39°52′00″N 86°03′46″W	Lawrence	
75	George Washington Tomlinson House	George Washington Tomlinson House	December 6, 2005 (#05001366)	5140 Reed Rd. 39°50′48″N 86°17′24″W	Pike	
76	Town of Crows Nest Historic District	Town of Crows Nest Historic District	April 13, 2000 (#00000305)	Roughly bounded by Kessler Boulevard, the White River, and Questover Circle; 39°51′25″N 86°10′11″W	Washington	
77	Traders Point Eagle Creek Rural Historic District	Traders Point Eagle Creek Rural Historic District	June 17, 2009 (#09000433)	Roughly between Interstate 865, Interstate 465, and Lafayette Rd. 39°53′53″N 86°17′05″W	Pike	Extends into Eagle Township in Boone County.
78	Washington Park Cemetery		March 2, 2023 (#100012769)	10612 E. Washington St. 39°46′33″N 85°58′39″W	Warren	
79	Washington Park Historic District	Washington Park Historic District	June 24, 2008 (#08000565)	Bounded by Pennsylvania St., Washington Boulevard, New Jersey, and the western side of Central Ave. between 40th and 43rd Sts. 39°49′53″N 86°09′08″W	Washington	
80	Wheeler–Stokely Mansion	Wheeler–Stokely Mansion	December 6, 2004 (#04001312)	3200 Cold Spring Rd. 39°48′44″N 86°12′09″W	Wayne	

== Former listings ==
	Name on the Register	Image	Date listed	Date removed	Location	City or town	Description
1	Cotton–Ropkey House	Cotton–Ropkey House	March 22, 1984 (#84001086)	September 18, 2017	6360 W. 79th St. 39°53′47″N 86°16′24″W	Pike	Demolished in 2016
2	Tee Pee Restaurant	Tee Pee Restaurant	December 11, 1986 (#86003374)	February 21, 1989	3820 Fall Creek Parkway, North Drive; 39°49′33″N 86°07′54″W	Washington	Demolished in 1988

== See also ==
- List of National Historic Landmarks in Indiana
- National Register of Historic Places listings in Indiana
- Listings in neighboring counties: Boone, Hamilton, Hancock, Hendricks, Johnson, Morgan, Shelby
- List of Indiana state historical markers in Marion County
