= Christopher Apple House =

Historic house in Indiana, United States

- U.S. National Register of Historic Places
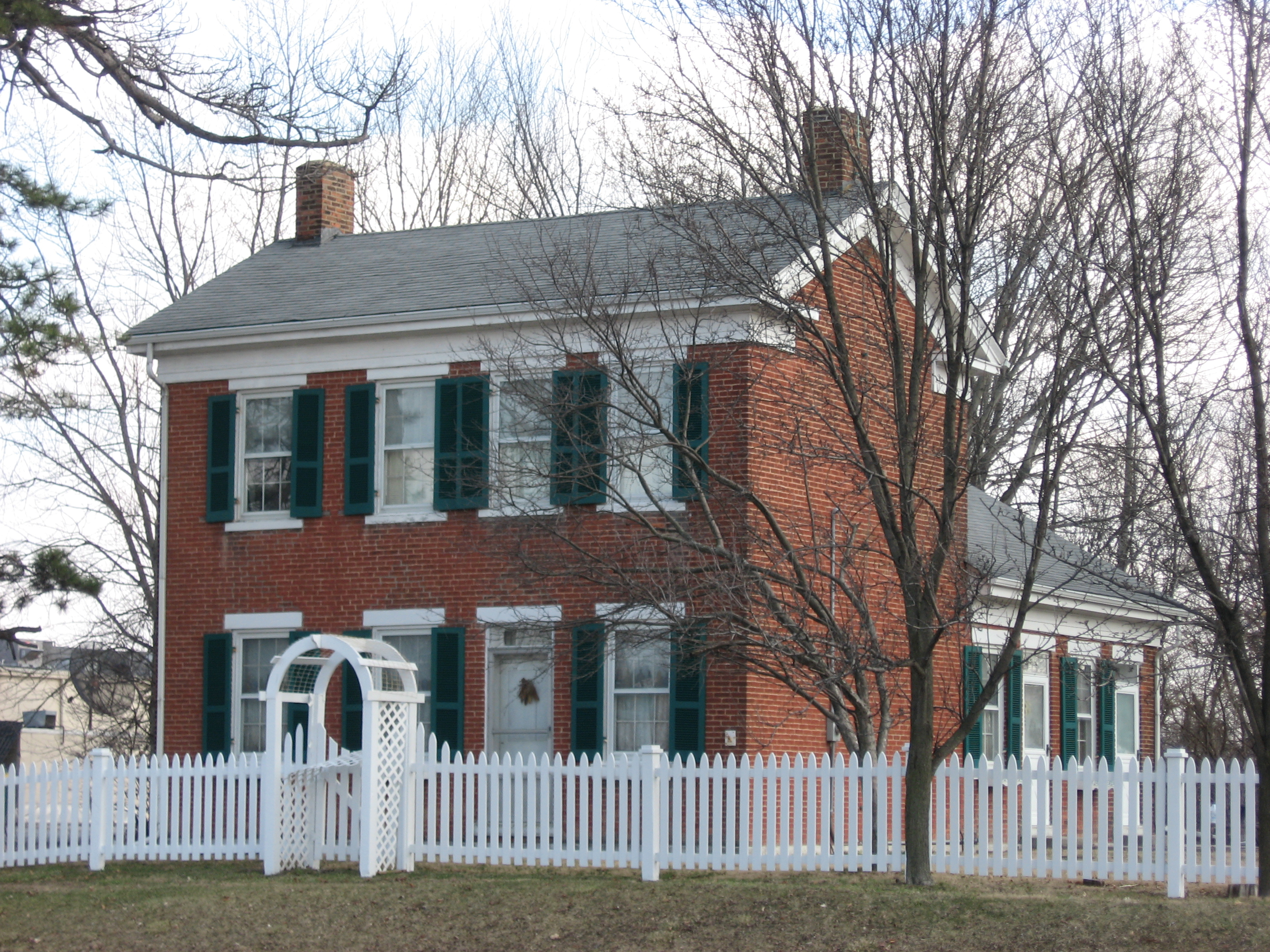
- Christopher Apple House, March 2011

- Location within Indianapolis Location within Indiana Location within the United States
- Location: 11663 Pendleton Pike, Indianapolis, Indiana
- Coordinates: 39°52′12″N 85°57′34″W
- Area: 1.5 acres (0.61 ha)
- Built: 1859
- Built by: Apple, Christopher
- Architectural style: Greek Revival, Federal
- NRHP reference No.: 80000055
- Added to NRHP: September 17, 1980

Christopher Apple House, also known as the Apple Farm House, is a historic home located in Indianapolis, Indiana. It was built in 1859, and is a two-story, four bay Federal style brick dwelling with Greek Revival style design elements. It has a side gable roof and 1 1/2-story rear wing.

It was added to the National Register of Historic Places in 1980.

== See also ==
- National Register of Historic Places listings in Marion County, Indiana
