= Speedway Historic District =

Historic district in Indiana, United States

- U.S. National Register of Historic Places
- U.S. Historic district
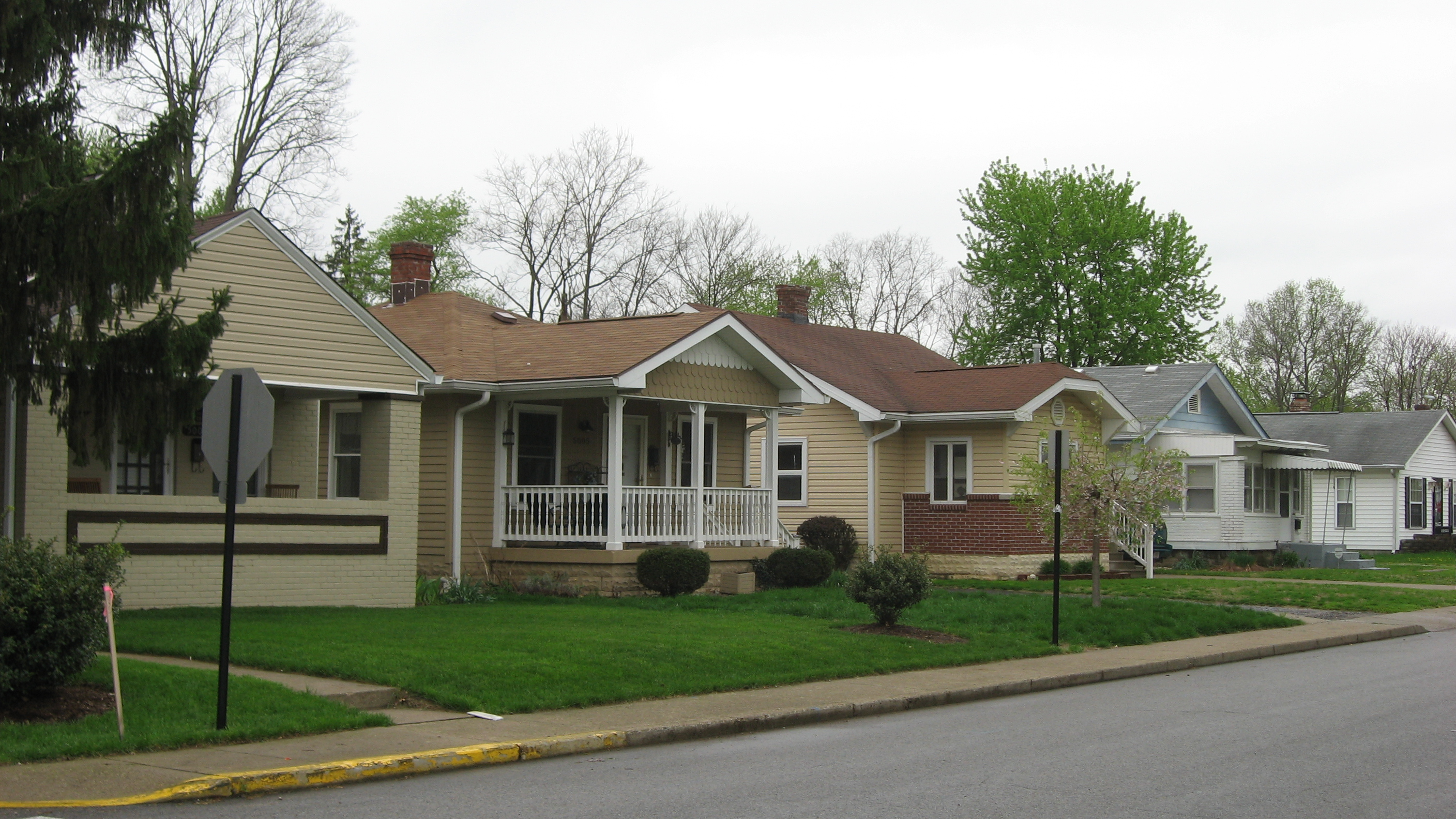
- Speedway Historic District, April 2011

- Location within Indianapolis Location within Indiana Location within the United States
- Location: Roughly bounded by 16th St., Main St. 10th St. and Winton Ave., Indianapolis, Indiana
- Coordinates: 39°47′02″N 86°14′38″W
- Area: 41.6 acres (16.8 ha)
- Architectural style: Late 19th and early 20th century American Movements, late 19th and 20th century Revivals
- NRHP reference No.: 05001015
- Added to NRHP: September 15, 2005

Speedway Historic District is a national historic district located in the Speedway, Indiana, USA It encompasses 304 contributing buildings in a planned residential subdivision of Indianapolis. The district developed between about 1912 and 1955 and includes representative examples of American Foursquare and Bungalow / American Craftsman style architecture.

It was listed on the National Register of Historic Places in 2005.

== See also ==
- National Register of Historic Places listings in Marion County, Indiana
