= Julian–Clark House =

Historic house in Indiana, United States

- U.S. National Register of Historic Places
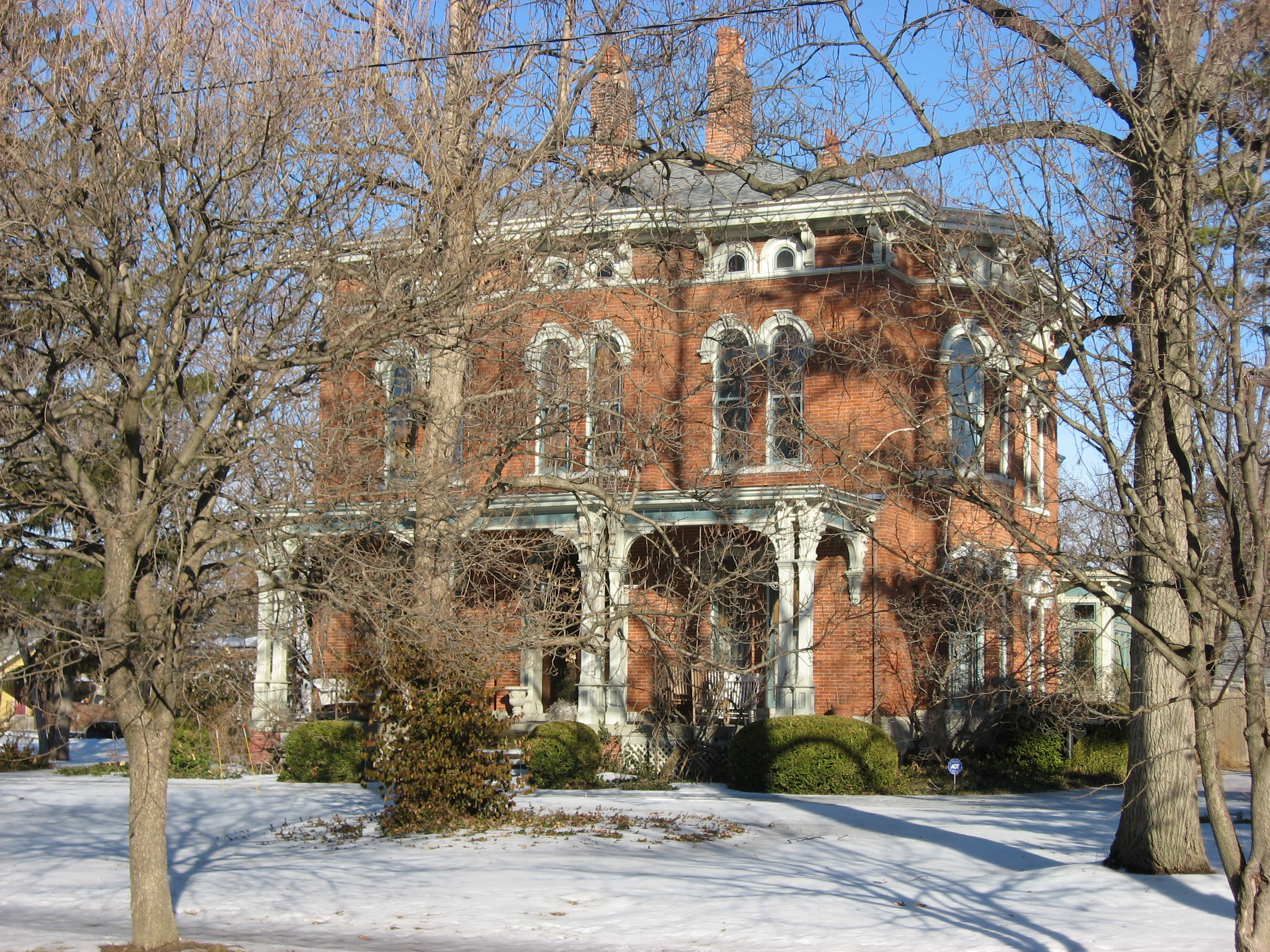
- Julian-Clark House, February 2011

- Location within Indianapolis Location within Indiana Location within the United States
- Location: 115 S. Audubon Rd., Indianapolis, Indiana
- Coordinates: 39°46′7″N 86°4′11″W
- Area: 1 acre (0.40 ha)
- Built: 1873
- Architectural style: Italianate
- NRHP reference No.: 86001335
- Added to NRHP: June 20, 1986

Julian–Clark House, also known as the Julian Mansion, is a historic home located at Indianapolis, Indiana. It was built in 1873, and is a 2 1/2-story, Italianate style brick dwelling. It has a low-pitched hipped roof with bracketed eaves and a full-width front porch. It features a two-story projecting bay and paired arched windows on the second story. From 1945 to 1973, the building housed Huff's Sanitarium.

It was added to the National Register of Historic Places in 1986.

== See also ==
- National Register of Historic Places listings in Marion County, Indiana
