= Hiram A. Haverstick Farmstead =

Historic house in Indiana, United States

- U.S. National Register of Historic Places
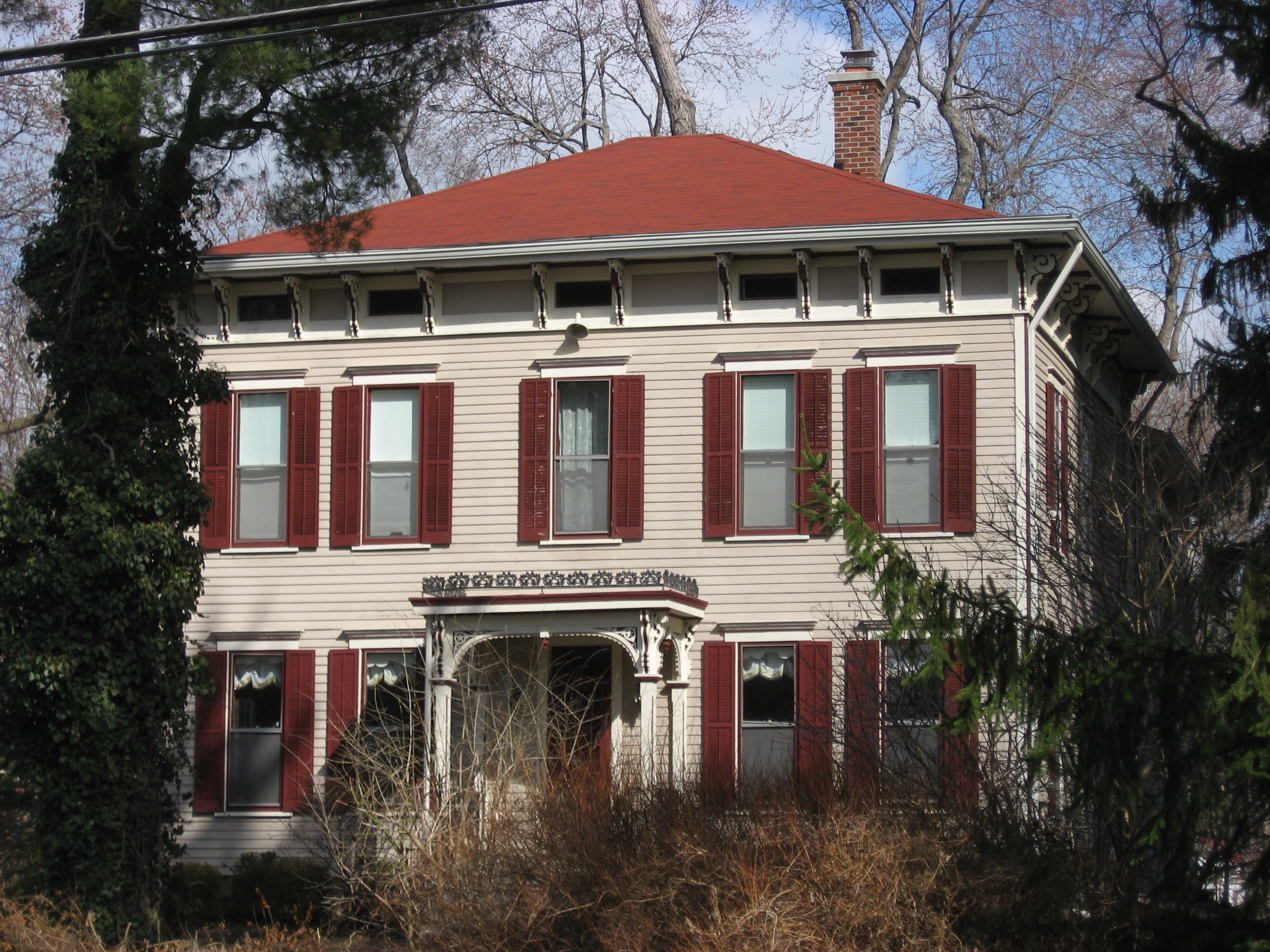
- Hiram A. Haverstick Farmhouse, March 2011

- Location within Indiana Location within the United States
- Location: 7845 Westfield Blvd., Indianapolis, Indiana
- Coordinates: 39°53′48″N 86°8′9″W
- Area: 2.5 acres (1.0 ha)
- Built: 1879
- Architectural style: Italianate
- NRHP reference No.: 85003126
- Added to NRHP: December 26, 1985

Hiram A. Haverstick Farmstead is a historic home located at Indianapolis, Indiana. It was built about 1879, and is a two-story, five-bay, Italianate style stone dwelling faced in brick. It is nearly square and has a summer kitchen attached by an enclosed breezeway. It has a low-pitched hipped roof with wide eaves supported by ornate wooden brackets and an ornate one-bay front porch.

It was added to the National Register of Historic Places in 1985.

== See also ==
- National Register of Historic Places listings in Marion County, Indiana
