= Emerson Avenue Addition Historic District =

Historic district in Indiana, United States

- U.S. National Register of Historic Places
- U.S. Historic district
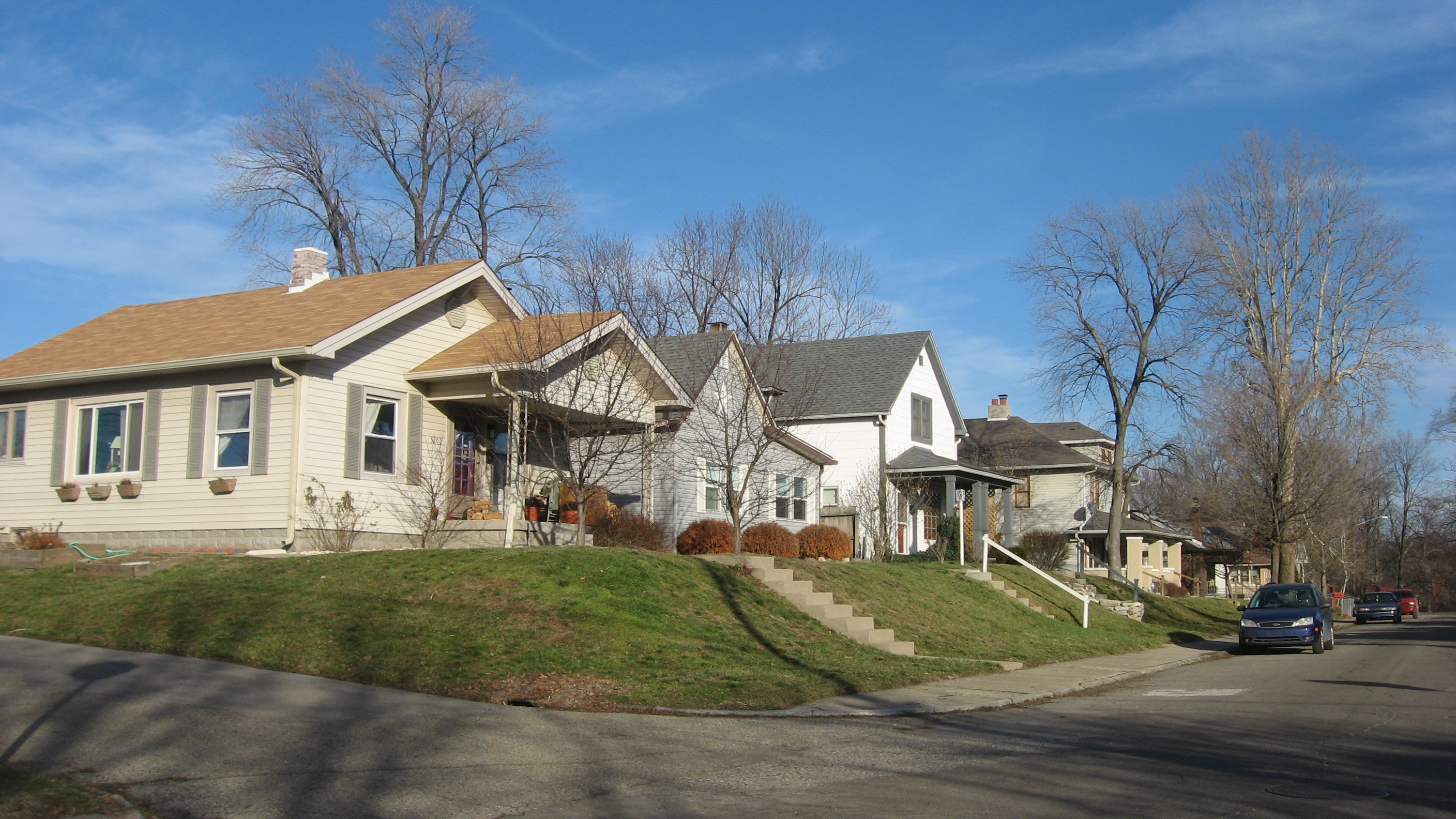
- Walnut east of Leland in Indianapolis, January 2013

- Location within Indianapolis Location within Indiana Location within the United States
- Location: Roughly bounded by E. Michigan and E. St Clair Sts., N. Emerson Ave., and Ellenberger Park, Indianapolis, Indiana
- Coordinates: 39°46′37″N 86°04′52″W
- Area: 143 acres (58 ha)
- Architect: Sears, Roebuck & Co.; Montgomery Ward; Alladin; et al.
- Architectural style: Tudor Revival, Colonial Revival, Bungalow/craftsman
- MPS: Historic Residential Suburbs in the United States, 1830-1960 MPS
- NRHP reference No.: 12001063
- Added to NRHP: December 19, 2012

Emerson Avenue Addition Historic District, also known as Emerson Heights Addition and Charles M. Cross Trust Clifford Avenue Addition, is a national historic district located at Indianapolis, Indiana. It encompasses 1,000 contributing buildings and 9 contributing objects in a planned residential section of Indianapolis. The district developed between about 1910 and 1949, and includes representative examples of Tudor Revival, Colonial Revival, and Bungalow / American Craftsman style residential architecture.

It was listed on the National Register of Historic Places in 2012.

== See also ==
- National Register of Historic Places listings in Marion County, Indiana
