= Irvington Terrace Historic District =

Historic district in Indiana, United States

- U.S. National Register of Historic Places
- U.S. Historic district
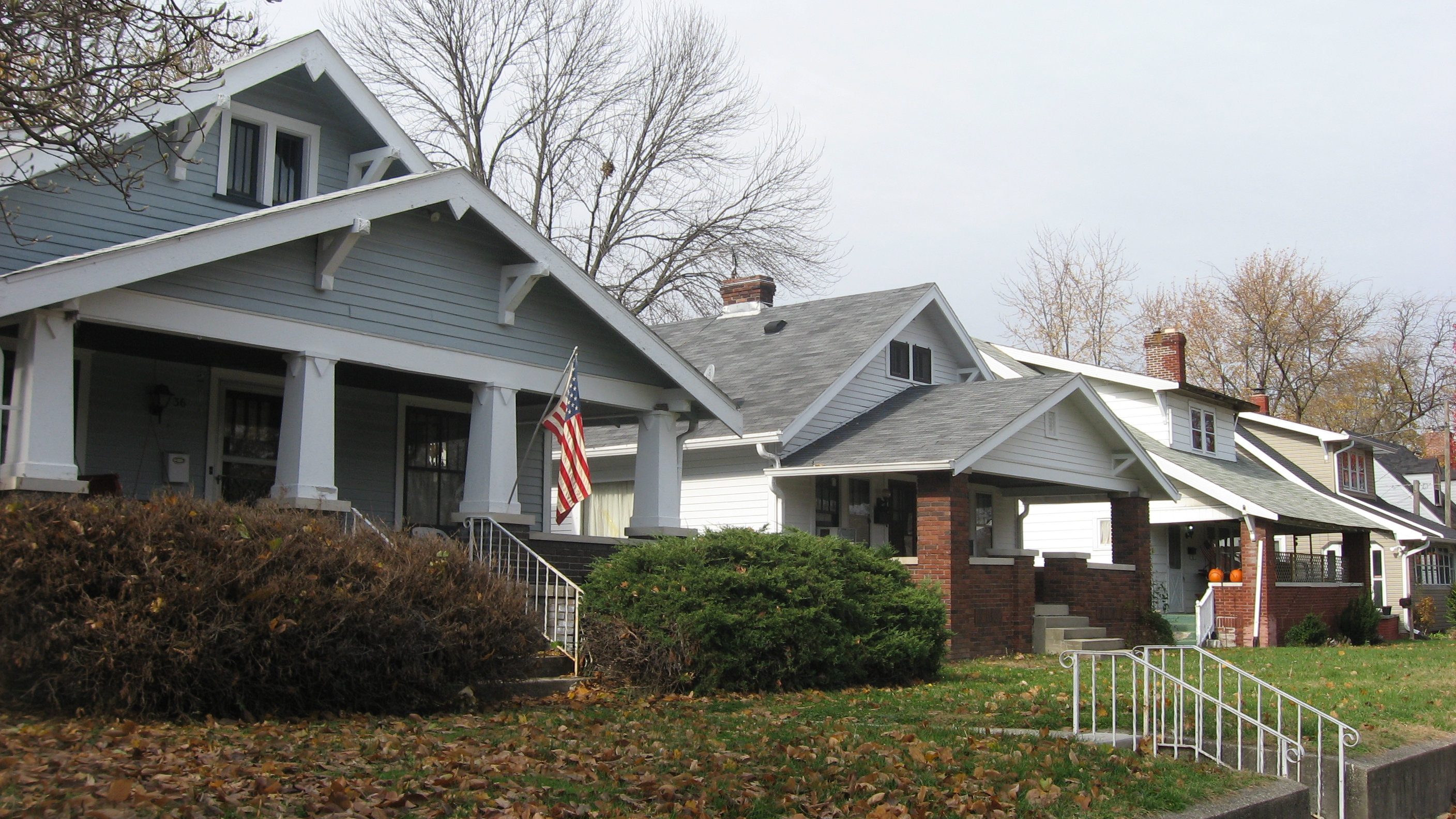
- Webster Avenue in Irvington Terrace, November 2011

- Location within Indianapolis Location within Indiana Location within the United States
- Location: Roughly bounded by E. Washington St., Pleasant Run Parkway, N. Arlington Ave., and the eastern side of N. Irwin St., Indianapolis, Indiana
- Coordinates: 39°46′21″N 86°03′46″W
- Area: 98 acres (40 ha)
- Architectural style: Tudor Revival, Colonial Revival, Bungalow/craftsman
- MPS: Historic Residential Suburbs in the United States, 1830-1960 MPS
- NRHP reference No.: 11000913
- Added to NRHP: December 19, 2011

Irvington Terrace Historic District is a national historic district located at Indianapolis, Indiana. It encompasses 578 contributing buildings and 9 contributing sites in a planned residential section of Indianapolis. The district developed between about 1895 and 1959, and includes representative examples of Tudor Revival, Colonial Revival, and Bungalow / American Craftsman style residential architecture.

It was listed on the National Register of Historic Places in 2011.

== See also ==
- National Register of Historic Places listings in Marion County, Indiana
