= Marion County Bridge 0501F =

- U.S. National Register of Historic Places
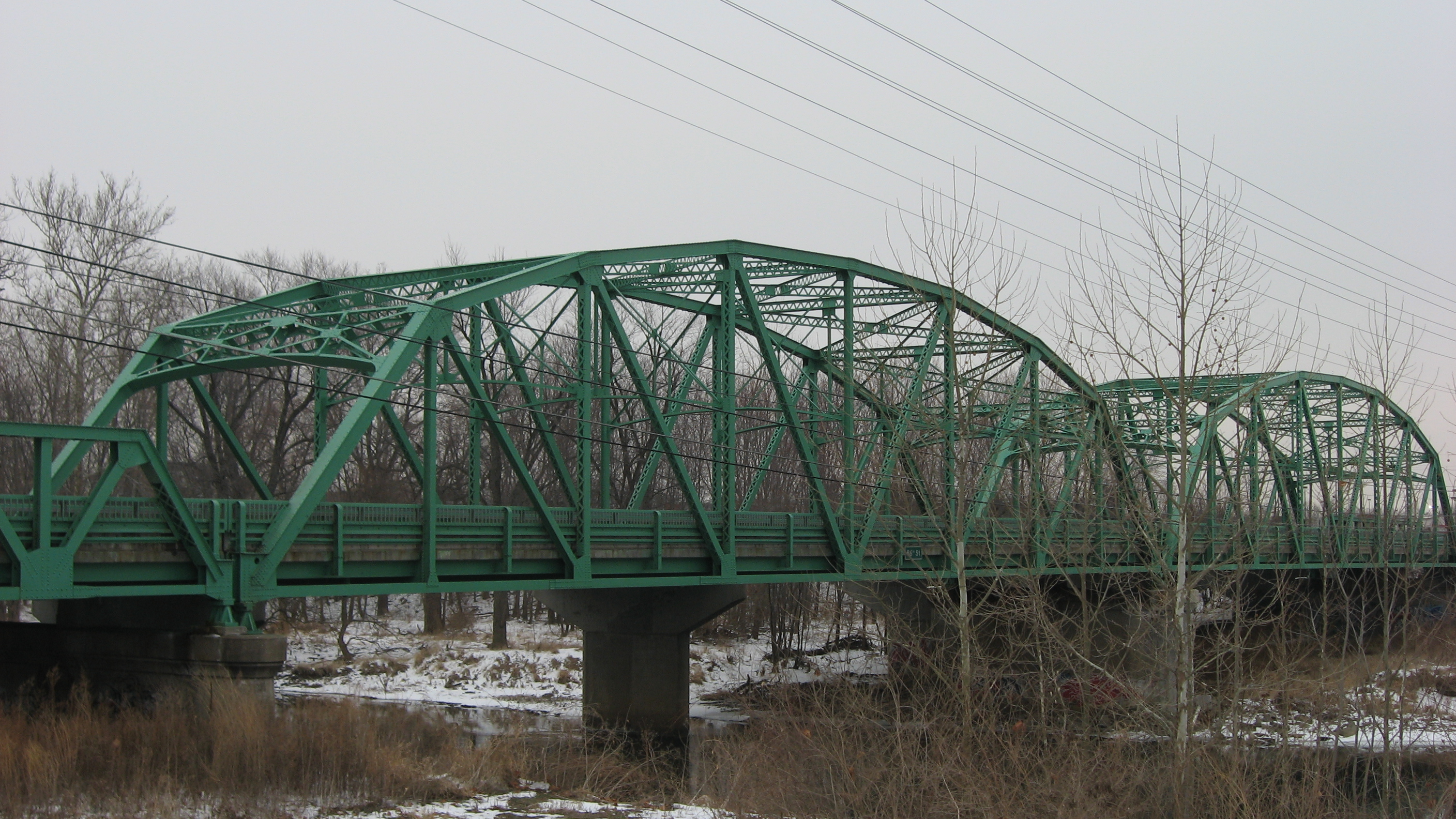
- Marion County Bridge 0501F, January 2011

- Location within Indiana Location within the United States
- Location: 86th and 82nd St. over White River, Indianapolis, Indiana
- Coordinates: 39°54′43″N 86°6′17″W
- Area: less than one acre
- Built: 1941-1942
- Built by: Curry, B.E. Building Co.
- Architectural style: Parker Steel
- NRHP reference No.: 06000853
- Added to NRHP: September 20, 2006

Marion County Bridge 0501F, also known as Indiana State Bridge 534-C-3439 on SR 100, is a historic truss bridge located on the Michigan Road at Indianapolis, Indiana. It was built in 1941–1942, as a bridge along the State Road 100 project. It consists of two identical Warren pony truss sections at each end with two Parker through truss spans at the center. The pony truss sections are each 96 feet long and the through truss spans are 174 feet long.

It was added to the National Register of Historic Places in 2006.

== See also ==
- National Register of Historic Places listings in Marion County, Indiana
