= Henry F. Campbell Mansion =

Historic house in Indiana, United States

- U.S. National Register of Historic Places
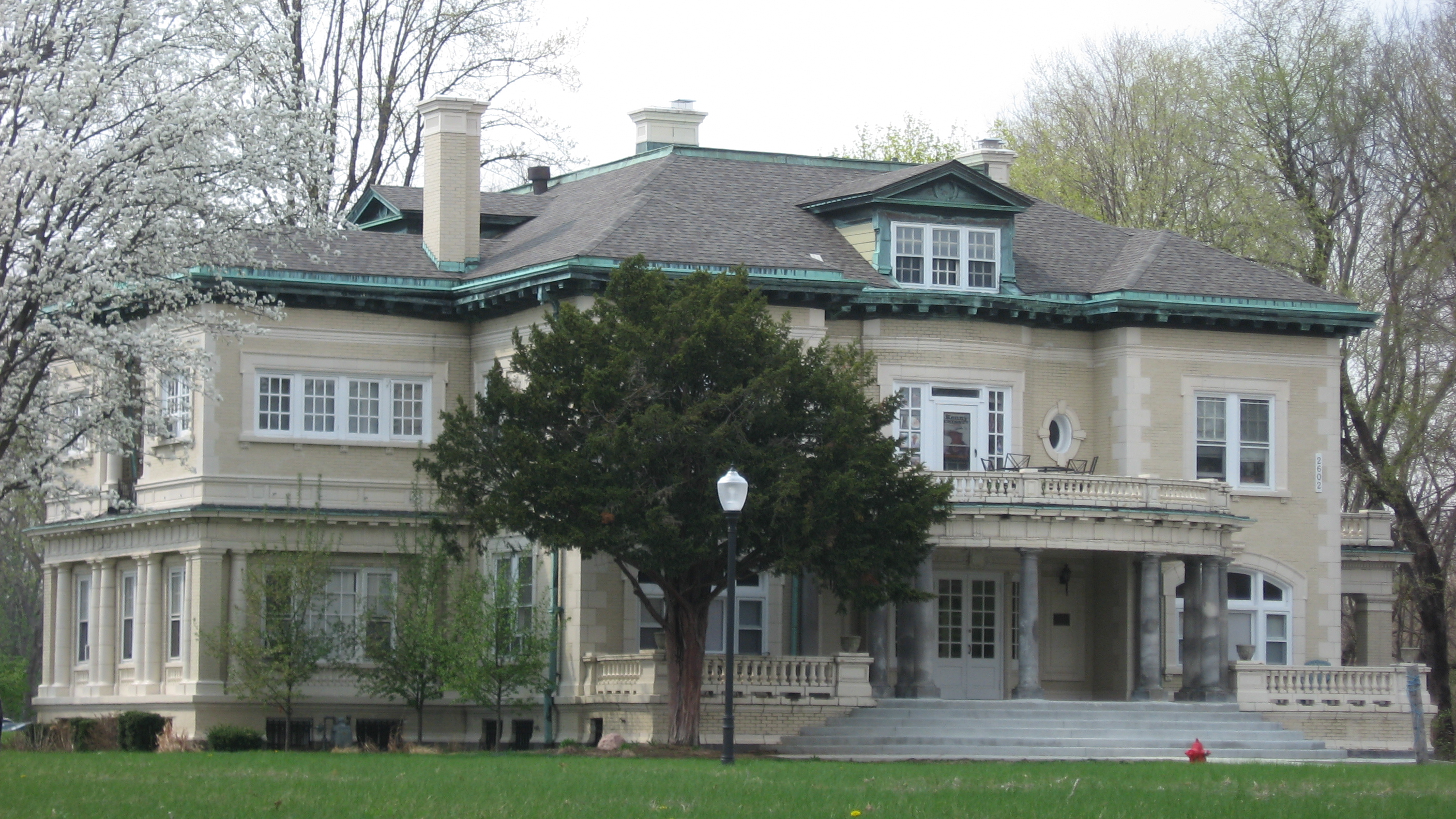
- Henry F. Campbell Mansion, April 2011

- Location within Indianapolis Location within Indiana Location within the United States
- Location: 2550 Cold Spring Rd., Indianapolis, Indiana
- Coordinates: 39°48′7″N 86°12′19″W
- Area: 5.7 acres (2.3 ha)
- Built: 1916-1922
- Architect: Bohlen, D.A.,& Son
- Architectural style: Late 19th And 20th Century Revivals, Italian Renaissance
- NRHP reference No.: 97000305
- Added to NRHP: April 14, 1997

Henry F. Campbell Mansion, also known as Esates Apartments, is a historic home located at Indianapolis, Indiana. It was built between 1916 and 1922, and is a large 2 1/2-story, Italian Renaissance style cream colored brick and terra cotta mansion. It has a green terra cotta tile hipped roof. The house features a semi-circular entry portico supported by 10 Tuscan order marble columns. Also on the property are the contributing gardener's house, six-car garage, barn, and a garden shed.

It was added to the National Register of Historic Places in 1997.

== See also ==
- National Register of Historic Places listings in Marion County, Indiana
