= Big Run Baptist Church and Cemetery =

Historic site in Marion County, Indiana, US

- U.S. National Register of Historic Places
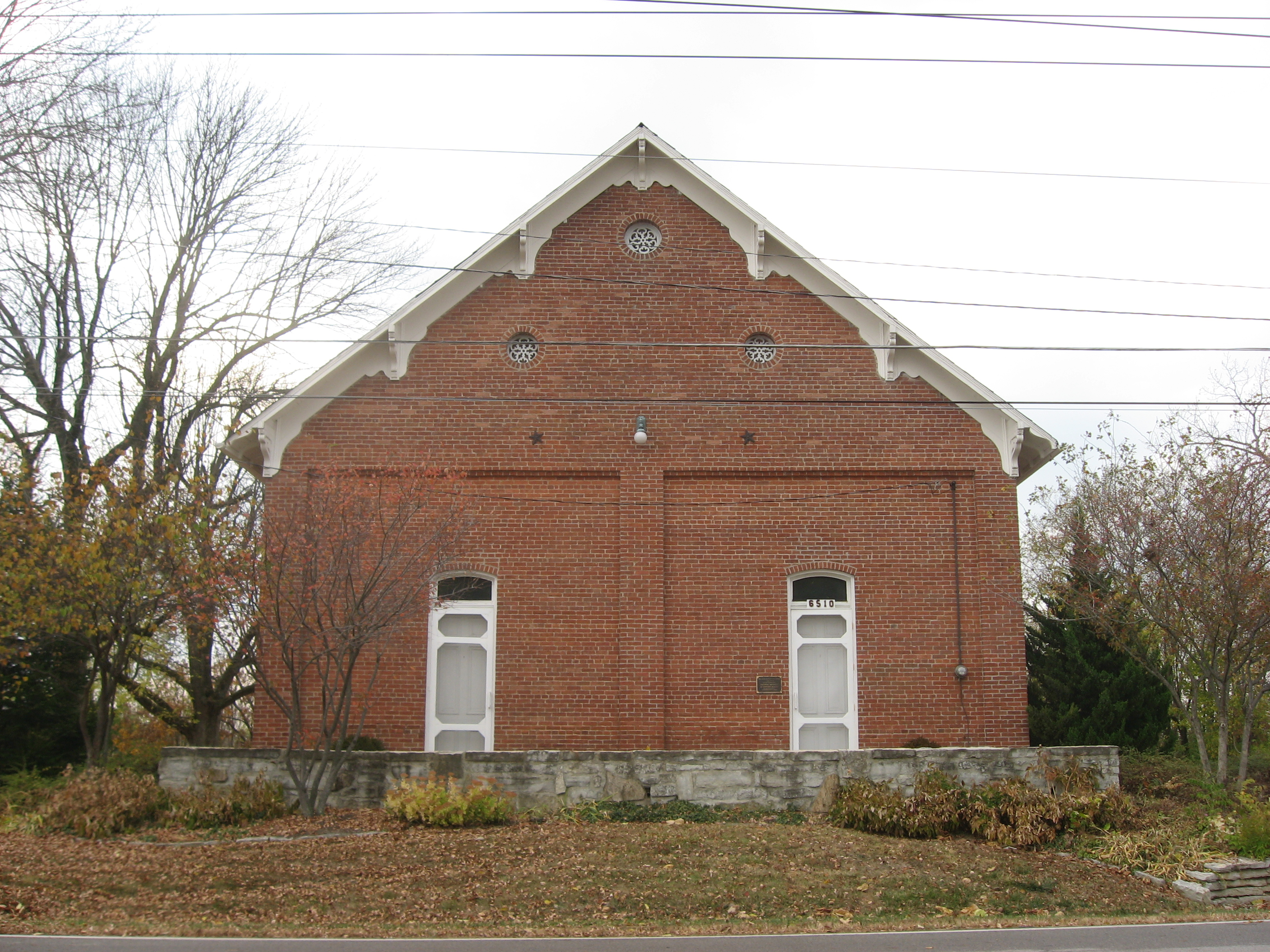

- Location within Indianapolis Location within Indiana Location within the United States
- Location: 6510 S. Franklin Rd., Indianapolis, Indiana
- Coordinates: 39°40′33″N 86°1′8″W
- Area: 2 acres (0.81 ha)
- Built: 1871
- Architectural style: Italianate, Gable-front
- NRHP reference No.: 05001367
- Added to NRHP: December 6, 2005

The Big Run Baptist Church and Cemetery, also known as the Franklin Township Historical Society, is a historic Baptist church and cemetery located at 6510 South Franklin Road in Indianapolis, Indiana. The church was built in 1871 as a Baptist meeting house (replacing an earlier wood-frame building on the same site) and served the church congregation until 1977, when the property was deeded to the Franklin Township Historical Society. It is a one-story, gable front brick building with Italianate style design elements. The bricks used to construct the building were fired onsite. Also on the property is a contributing privy constructed about 1920. The Franklin Township Historical Society acquired the property and now uses the building as a historical museum. It was added to the National Register of Historic Places in 2005.

The associated cemetery was established in 1854, with one stone dated to 1841. Some stones found at nearby sites have also been moved to this cemetery for preservation. Per the terms of its deeding to the Franklin Township Historical Society, the cemetery can still be used by descendants of the original land donors (variously recorded as Samuel and Agnes Smith, who donated the land for the church, or Willis and Mary Smither, who had a family cemetery at this location). The most recent marker is that of Mary Smith (d. 2023). By arrangement with the Franklin Township Historical Society, her memorial service was held at the former church on May 18, 2024.

== See also ==
- National Register of Historic Places listings in Marion County, Indiana
