= Roy and Iris Corbin Lustron House =

Historic home

- U.S. National Register of Historic Places
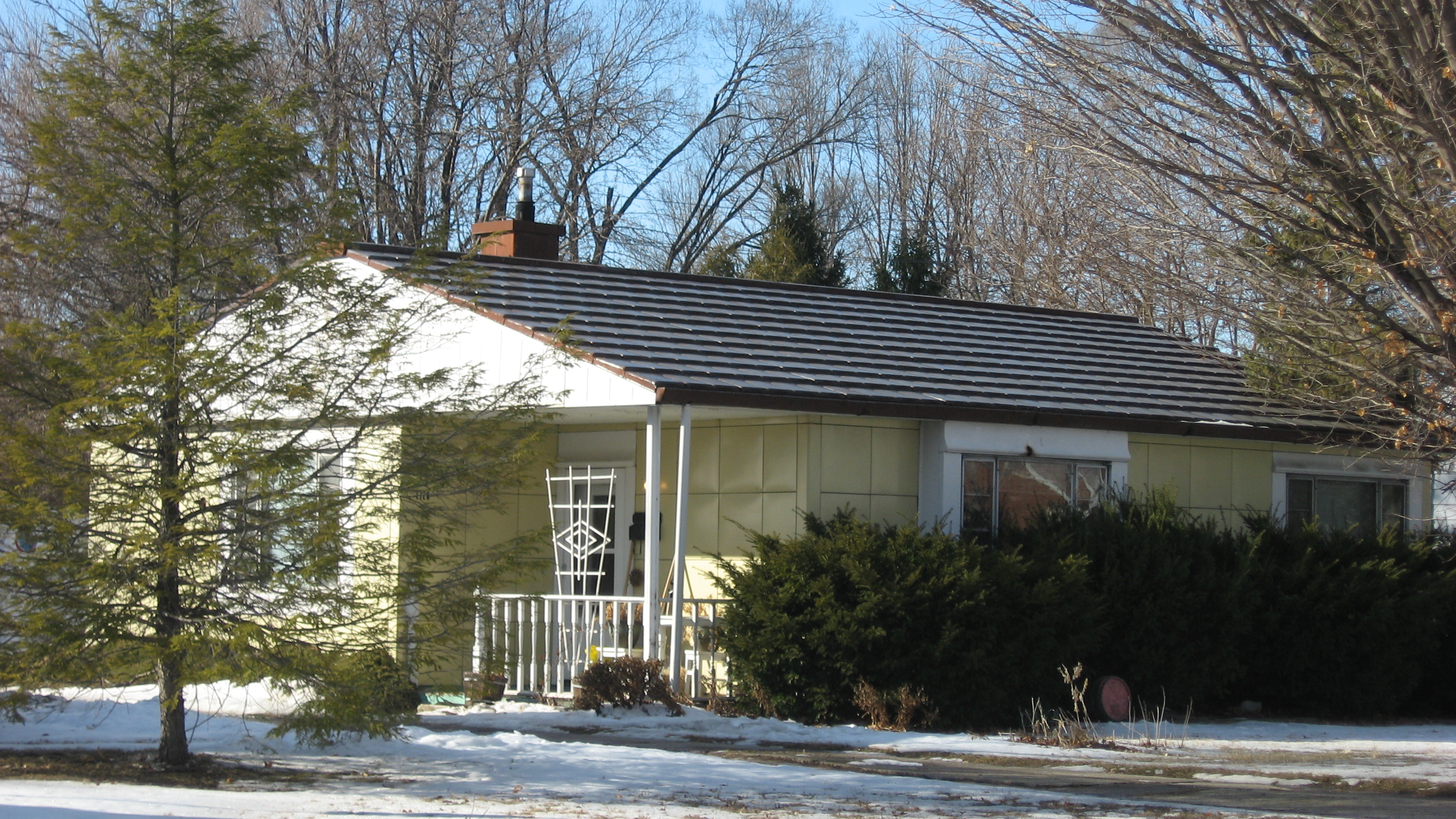
- Roy and Iris Corbin Lustron House, February 2011

- Location within Indianapolis Location within Indiana Location within the United States
- Location: 1728 N. Leland Ave., Indianapolis, Indiana
- Coordinates: 39°47′26″N 86°4′55″W
- Area: less than one acre
- Built: 1949
- Built by: Lustron Corporation, et al.
- Architect: Beckman, Morris
- Architectural style: Moderne, Lustron
- NRHP reference No.: 97001173
- Added to NRHP: October 9, 1997

Roy and Iris Corbin Lustron House, also known as the Corbin-Featherstone House, is a historic home located at Indianapolis, Indiana. It was built in 1949, and is a one-story, side gabled Lustron house. It is constructed of steel and is sided and roofed with porcelain enameled steel panels. It sits on a poured concrete pad and measures 1,085 square feet. A garage was added to the house in the 1950s. It is one of about 30 Lustron houses built in Marion County.

It was added to the National Register of Historic Places in 1997.

== See also ==
- National Register of Historic Places listings in Marion County, Indiana
