= Wheeler–Stokely Mansion =

Historic house in Indiana, United States

- U.S. National Register of Historic Places
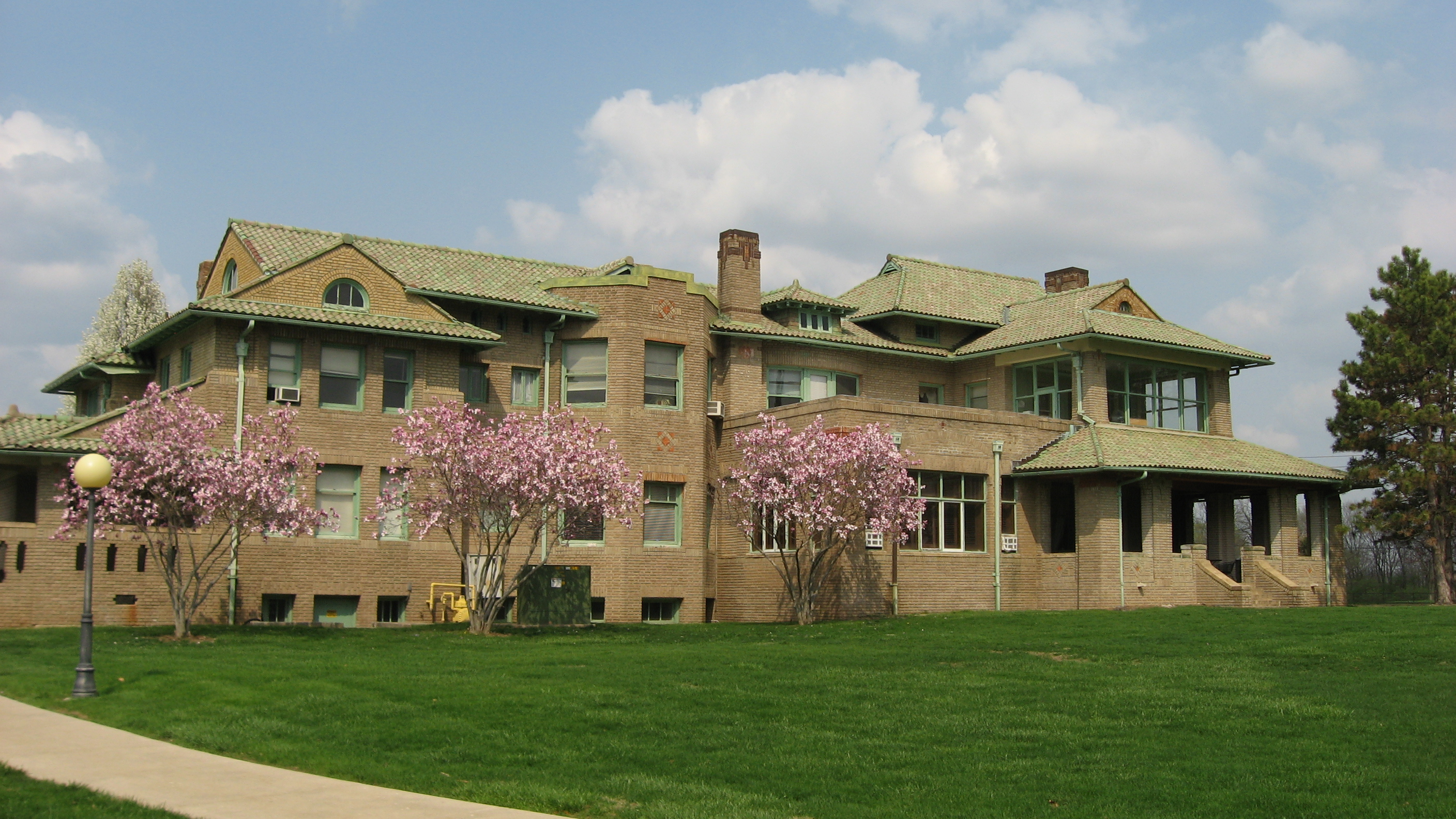
- Wheeler-Stokely Mansion, April 2011

- Location within Indianapolis Location within Indiana Location within the United States
- Location: 3200 Cold Spring Rd., Indianapolis, Indiana
- Coordinates: 39°48′44″N 86°12′09″W
- Area: 8.5 acres (3.4 ha)
- Built: 1912
- Architect: Price, William L.; Price & McLanahan
- Architectural style: Bungalow/craftsman
- NRHP reference No.: 04001312
- Added to NRHP: December 6, 2004

Wheeler–Stokely Mansion, also known as Hawkeye, Magnolia Farm, and Stokely Music Hall, is a historic home located at Indianapolis, Indiana. It was built in 1912, and is a large 2 1/2-story, asymmetrically massed, Arts and Crafts style buff brick mansion. The house is ornamented with bands of ceramic tile and has a tile roof. It features a 1 1/2-story arcaded porch, porte cochere, and porch with second story sunroom / sleeping porch. Also on the property are the contributing gate house, 320-foot-long colonnade, gazebo, teahouse, gardener's house, dog walk, and landscaped property.

It was added to the National Register of Historic Places in 2004.

== See also ==
- Marian University
- National Register of Historic Places listings in Marion County, Indiana
