= Pleasanton in Irvington Historic District =

Historic district in Indiana, United States

- U.S. National Register of Historic Places
- U.S. Historic district
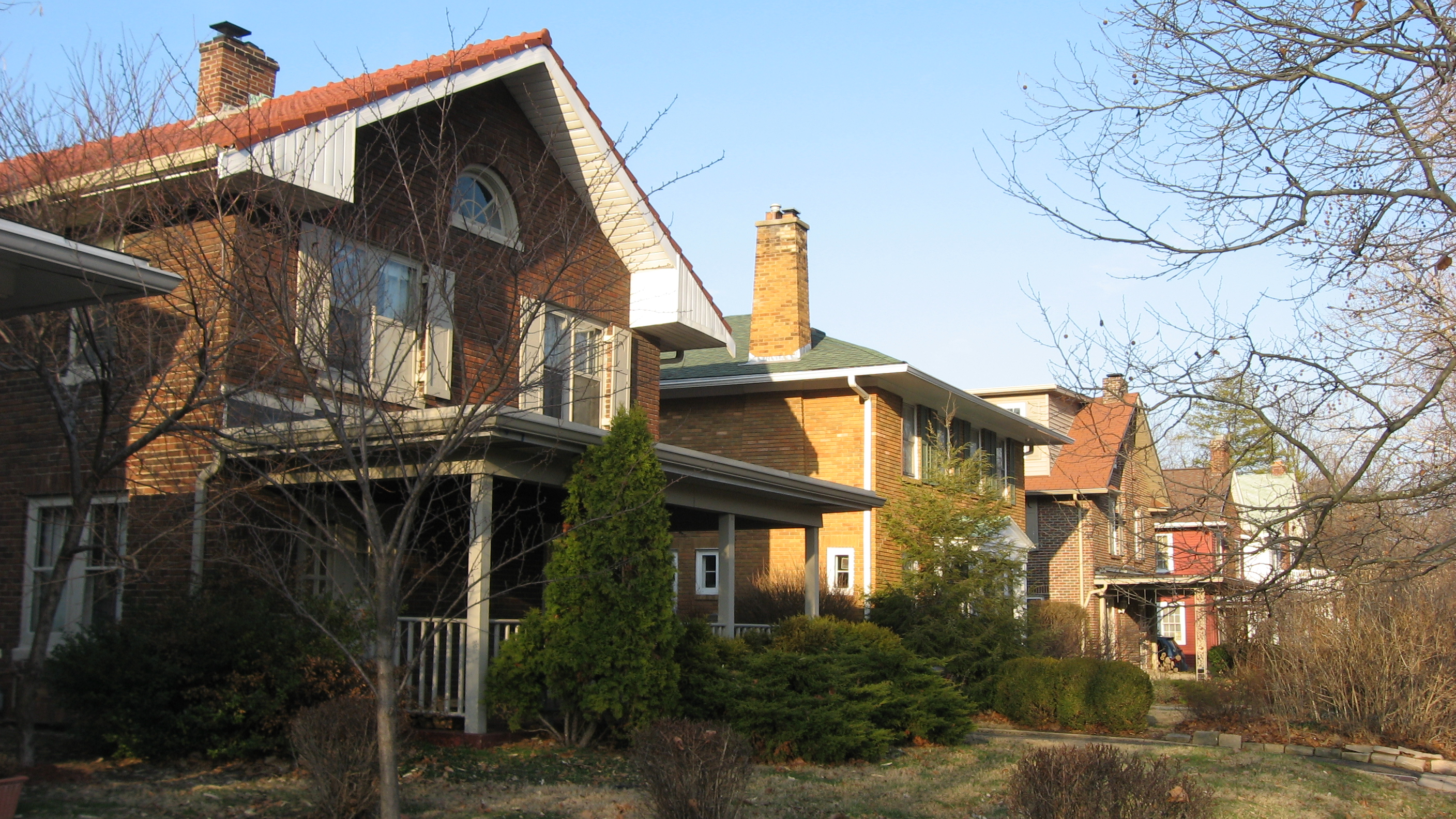
- Pleasanton in Irvington, March 2011

- Location within Indianapolis Location within Indiana Location within the United States
- Location: Roughly bounded by E. Michigan St., Pleasant Run Parkway North Dr., and Emerson Ave., Indianapolis, Indiana
- Coordinates: 39°46′32″N 86°04′53″W
- Area: 18.5 acres (7.5 ha)
- Architect: Architect's Small House Bureau; Hegel, John
- Architectural style: Tudor Revival, Colonial Revival, Bungalow/craftsman
- MPS: Historic Residential Suburbs in the United States, 1830-1960 MPS
- NRHP reference No.: 10001083
- Added to NRHP: December 27, 2010

Pleasanton in Irvington Historic District is a national historic district located at Indianapolis, Indiana. It encompasses 149 contributing buildings and 1 contributing site in a planned residential section of Indianapolis. The district developed between about 1915 and 1959, and includes representative examples of Tudor Revival, Colonial Revival, and Bungalow / American Craftsman style residential architecture.

It was listed on the National Register of Historic Places in 2010.

== See also ==
- National Register of Historic Places listings in Marion County, Indiana
