= Jamieson–Bennett House =

Historic house in Indiana, United States

- U.S. National Register of Historic Places
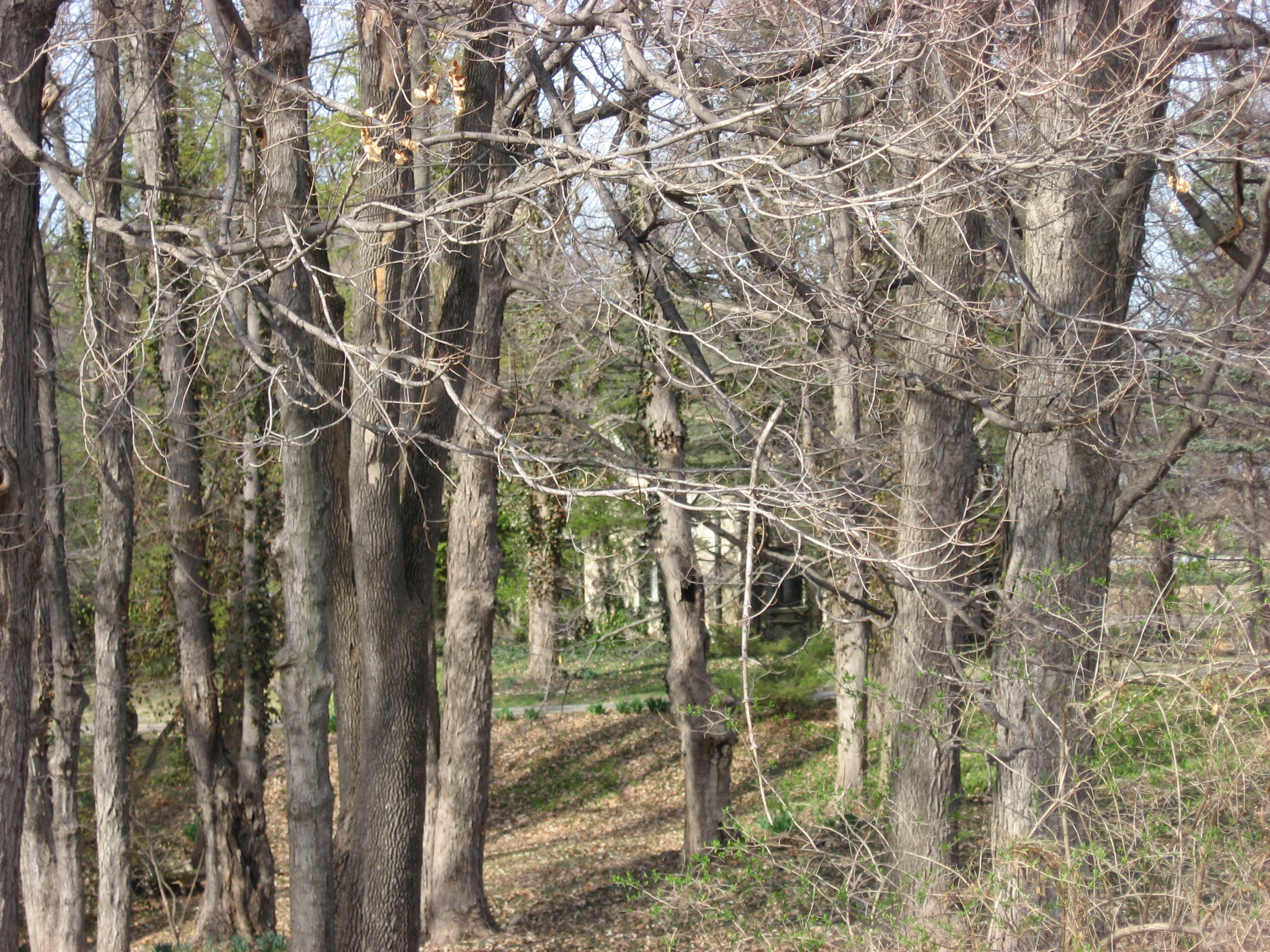
- Jamieson-Bennett House through the trees, March 2011

- Location within Indianapolis Location within Indiana Location within the United States
- Location: 8452 Green Braes North Dr., Indianapolis, Indiana
- Coordinates: 39°50′55″N 86°18′48″W
- Area: 2.1 acres (0.85 ha)
- Built: 1936
- Architect: Federman, Charles R.
- Architectural style: Tudor Revival
- NRHP reference No.: 01000984
- Added to NRHP: September 16, 2001

Jamieson–Bennett House is a historic home located at Indianapolis, Indiana. It was built in 1936, and is a 1 1/2-story, Tudor Revival style dwelling sheathed in a limestone veneer. It has a tiled gable roof, cast stone trim, and leaded glass windows.

It was added to the National Register of Historic Places in 2001.

== See also ==
- National Register of Historic Places listings in Marion County, Indiana
