= Anderson–Thompson House =

Historic house in Indiana, United States

- U.S. National Register of Historic Places
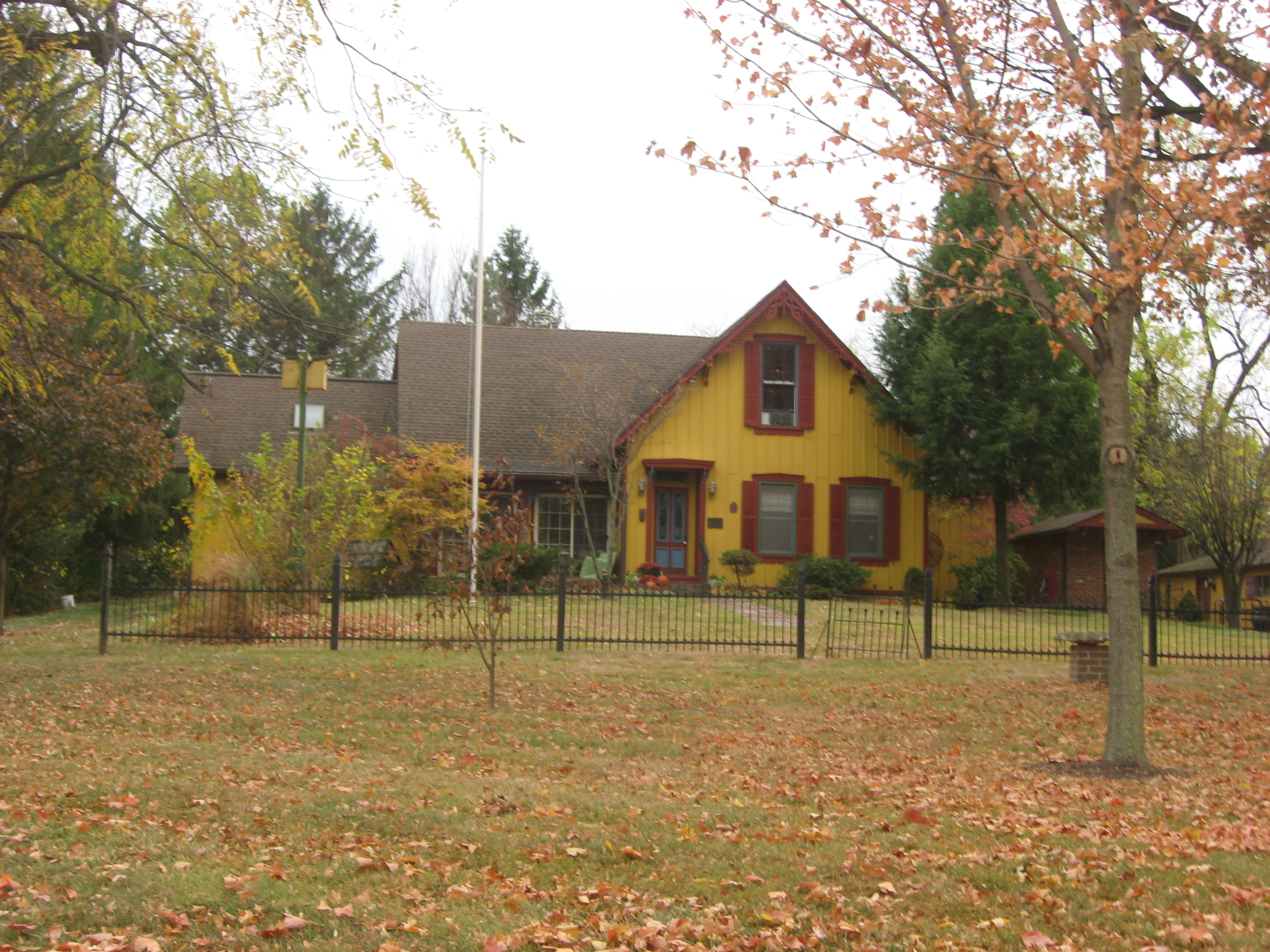
- Anderson–Thompson House, October 2010

- Location within Indianapolis Location within Indiana Location within the United States
- Location: 6551 Shelbyville Rd., Indianapolis, Indiana
- Coordinates: 39°40′2″N 86°3′9″W
- Area: 2.2 acres (0.89 ha)
- Built: c. 1855-1860
- Architectural style: Gothic Revival
- NRHP reference No.: 87000502
- Added to NRHP: March 26, 1987

Anderson–Thompson House, also known as Thompson–Schultz House , is a historic home located in Indianapolis, Indiana. It was built between about 1855 and 1860, and is a 1 1/2-story, ell shaped, Gothic Revival style dwelling. It rests on a low brick foundation, has a steeply pitched gable roof with ornately carved brackets, and is sheathed in board and batten siding.

It was added to the National Register of Historic Places in 1987.

== See also ==
- National Register of Historic Places listings in Marion County, Indiana
