= Camp Edwin F. Glenn =

- U.S. National Register of Historic Places
- U.S. Historic district
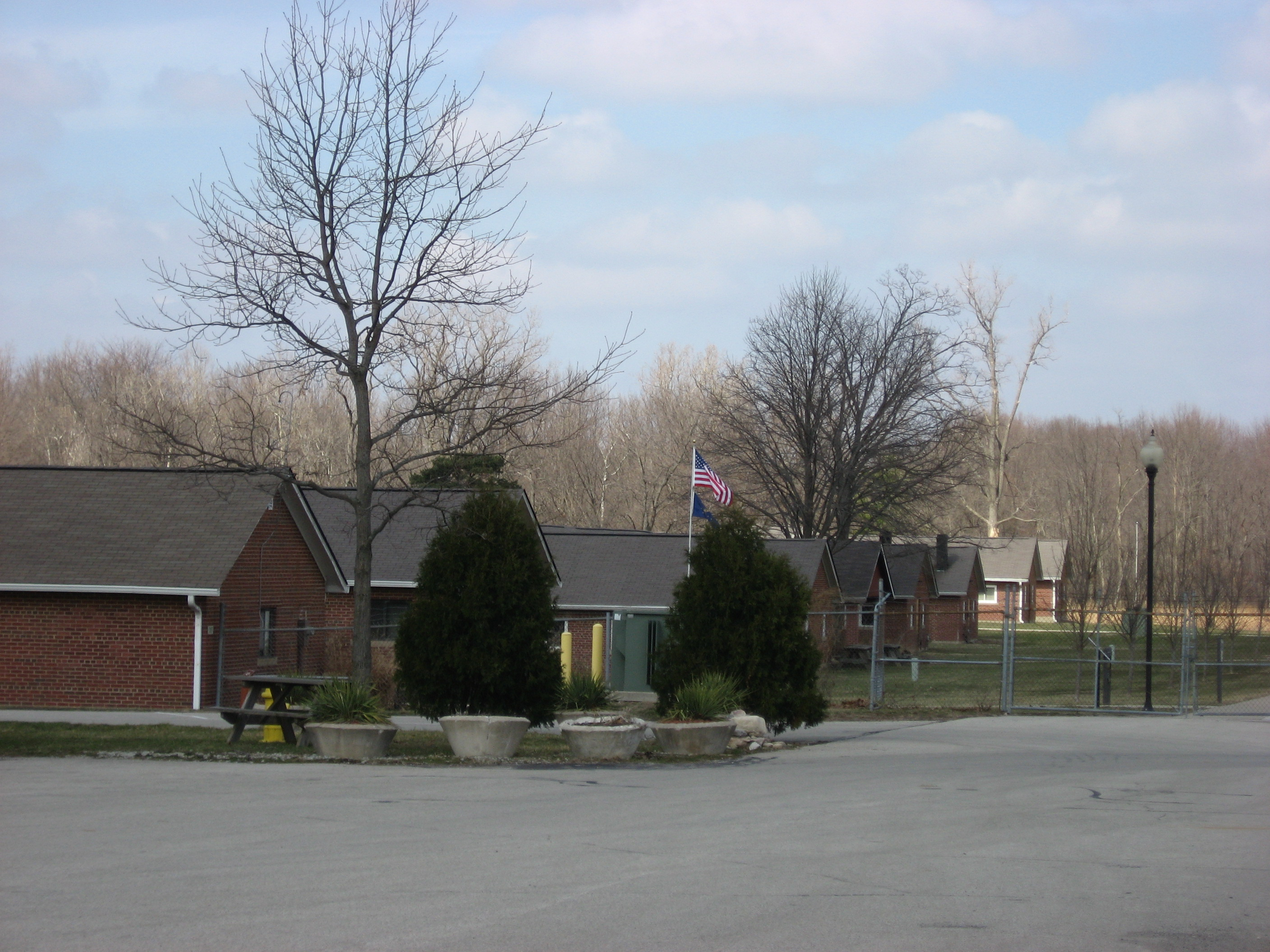
- Barracks at Camp Edwin F. Glenn, March 2011

- Location within Indianapolis Location within Indiana Location within the United States
- Location: Fort Benjamin Harrison, Indianapolis, Indiana
- Coordinates: 39°51′34″N 86°01′16″W
- Area: 18 acres (7.3 ha)
- Built by: United States Army
- NRHP reference No.: 95001360
- Added to NRHP: December 1, 1995

Camp Edwin F. Glenn is a national historic district located at Fort Benjamin Harrison, Indianapolis, Indiana. It encompasses 19 contributing buildings and 360 contributing structures in a former military camp. The district developed between about 1925 and 1941. It originally served as a Citizens' Military Training Camp from 1925 to 1941, a camp for the Civilian Conservation Corps from 1933 to 1941, and a Prisoner of War camp from 1944 to 1945. The district includes six warehouses, five mess halls, five lavatories, a branch exchange, butcher shop, latrine, and 360 concrete tent pads.

It was listed on the National Register of Historic Places in 1995.

== Gallery ==
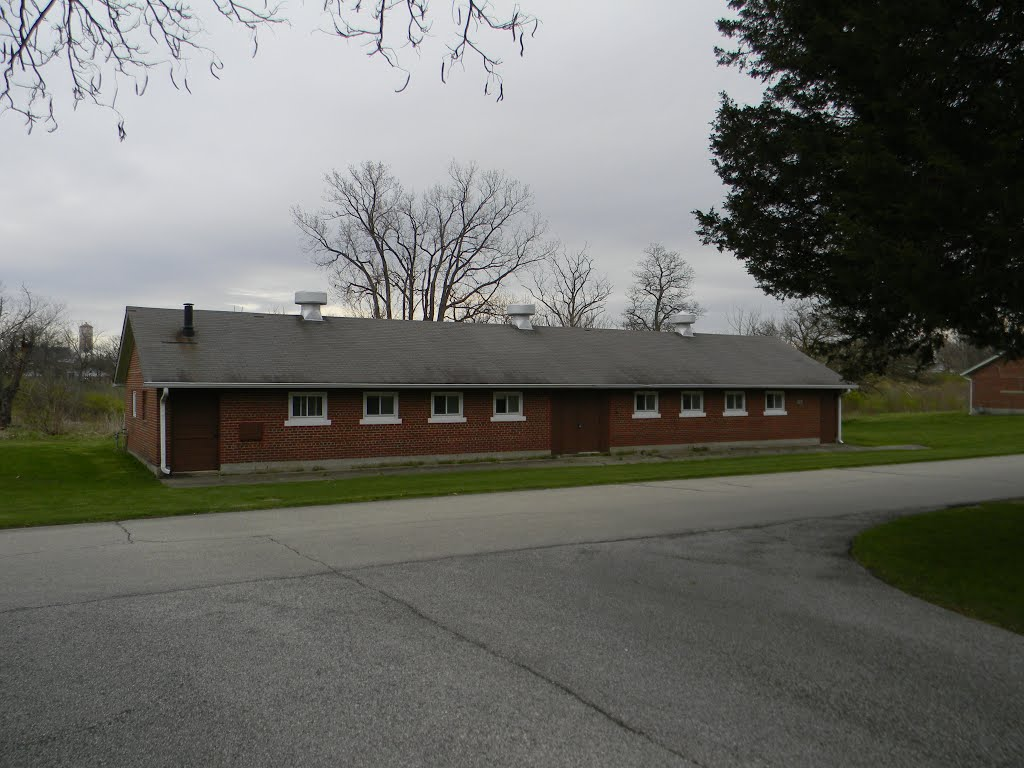
Building 703 – April, 2016

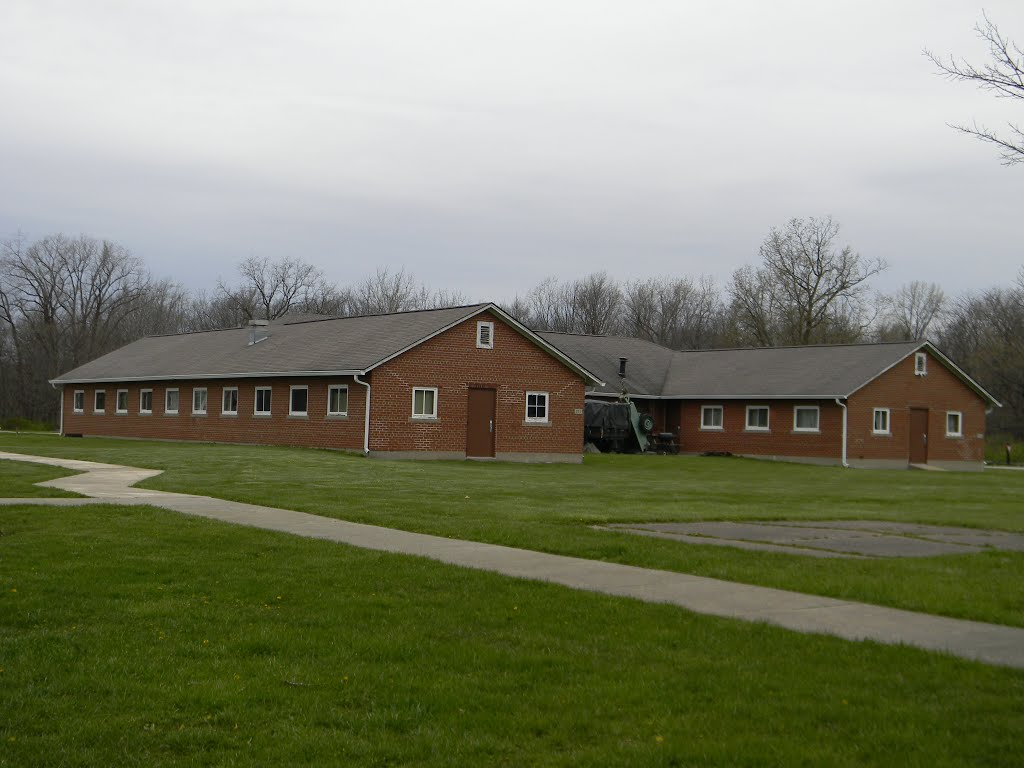
Building 710 – April, 2016

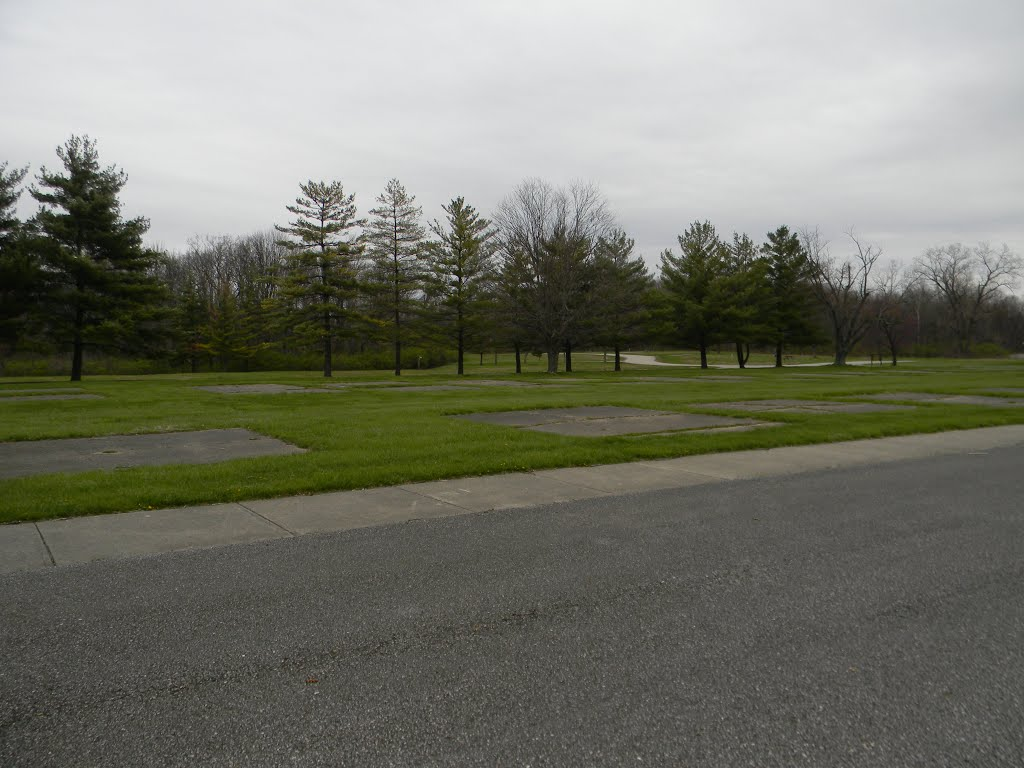
Camp Edwin F. Glenn tent pads utilized by German and Italian WWII POWs – April, 2016

== See also ==
- National Register of Historic Places listings in Marion County, Indiana
