= Broad Ripple Firehouse–Indianapolis Fire Department Station 32 =

- U.S. National Register of Historic Places
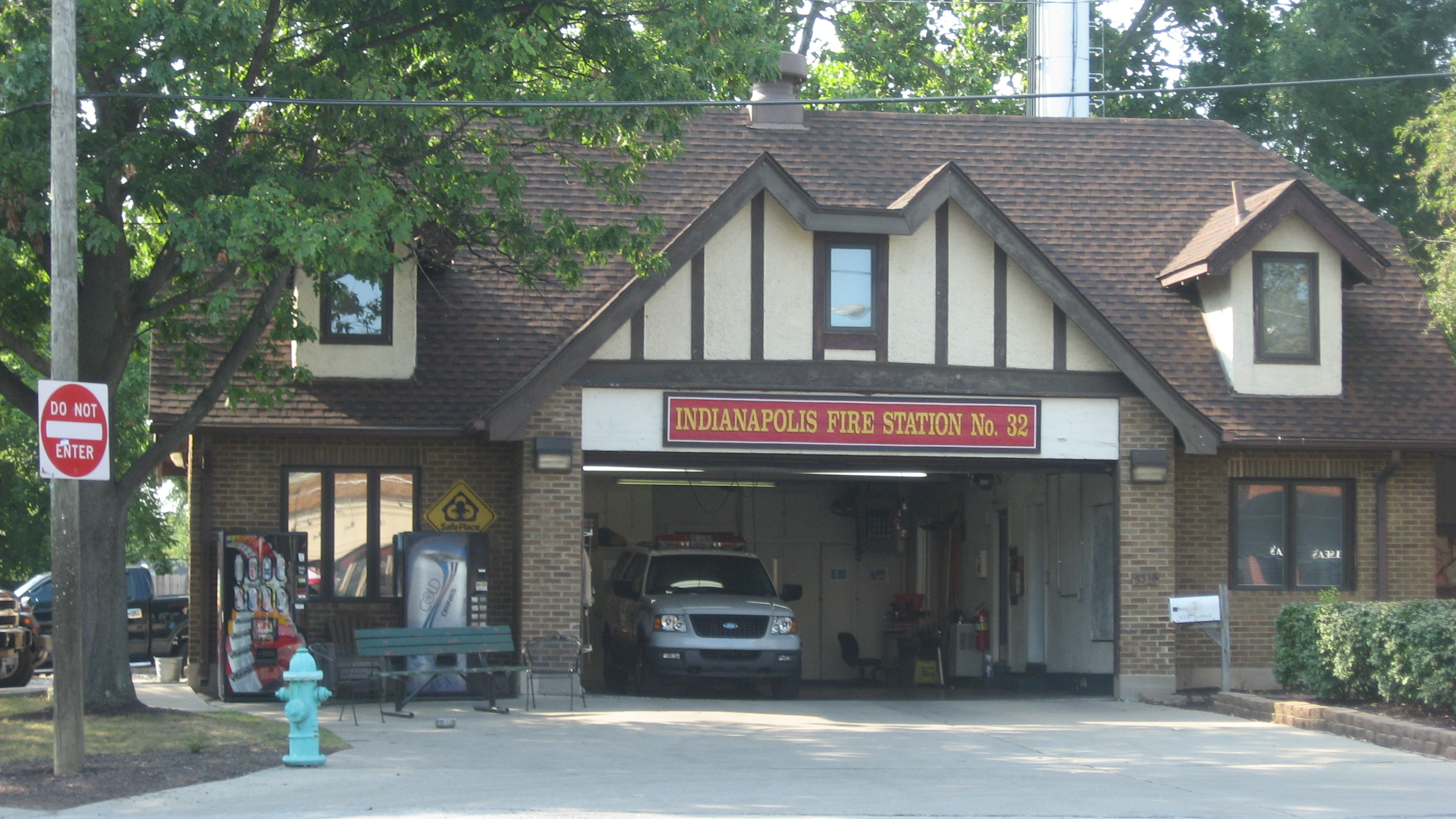
- Broad Ripple Firehouse, July 2011

- Location within Indianapolis Location within Indiana Location within the United States
- Location: 6330 Guilford Ave., Indianapolis, Indiana
- Coordinates: 39°52′15″N 86°8′35″W
- Area: Less than 1 acre (0.40 ha)
- Built: 1922
- Built by: Service Construction Company
- Architect: Parrish, John P.
- Architectural style: Tudor Revival
- NRHP reference No.: 11000658
- Added to NRHP: September 15, 2011

Broad Ripple Firehouse–Indianapolis Fire Department Station 32 is a historic fire station located in Indianapolis, Indiana. It was built in 1922, and is a 1 1/2-story, cross plan, Tudor Revival style brown brick building. It features a jerkinhead roof with deep overhanging eaves and a double peak, half-timbered gable. An addition was constructed in 1980.

It was listed on the National Register of Historic Places in 2011.

== See also ==
- Indianapolis Fire Department
- National Register of Historic Places listings in Marion County, Indiana
