= Forest Hills Historic District (Indianapolis, Indiana) =

Historic district in Indiana, United States

- U.S. National Register of Historic Places
- U.S. Historic district
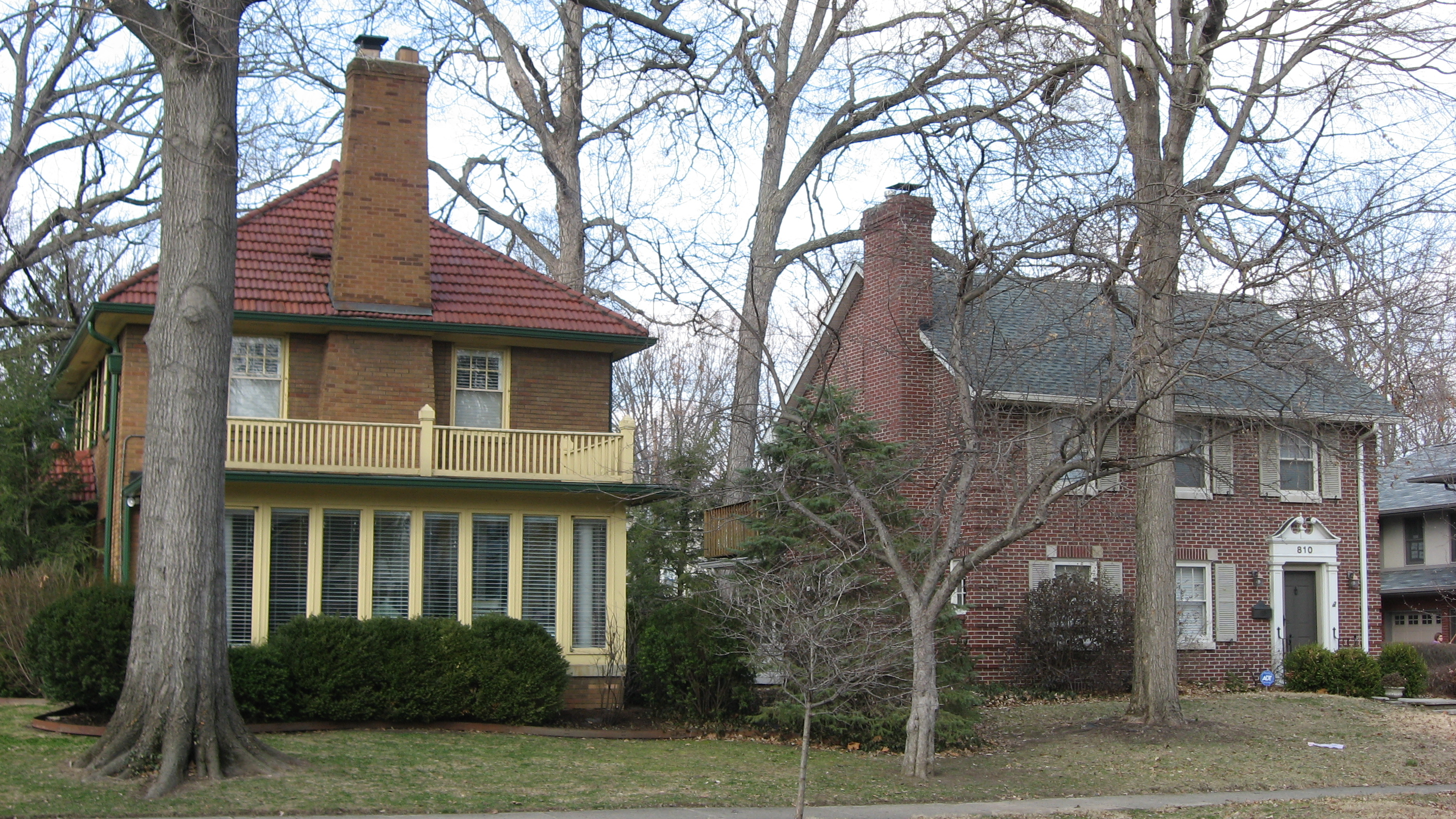
- Houses in the Forest Hills Historic District

- Location within Indianapolis Location within Indiana Location within the United States
- Location: Bounded by the Monon RR Tracks, Kessler Blvd., College and Northview Aves., Indianapolis, Indiana
- Coordinates: 39°51′32″N 86°8′35″W
- Area: 72 acres (29 ha)
- Built: 1911
- Architect: Stevenson, Benjamin
- Architectural style: English Tudor
- NRHP reference No.: 83000130
- Added to NRHP: June 30, 1983

Forest Hills Historic District is a national historic district located at Indianapolis, Indiana. It encompasses 173 contributing buildings and 7 contributing structures in a planned residential section of Indianapolis. It developed between about 1911 and 1935, and includes representative examples of Tudor Revival and English Cottage style architecture.

It was listed on the National Register of Historic Places in 1983.

== See also ==
- National Register of Historic Places listings in Marion County, Indiana
