= Old Southport High School =

- U.S. National Register of Historic Places
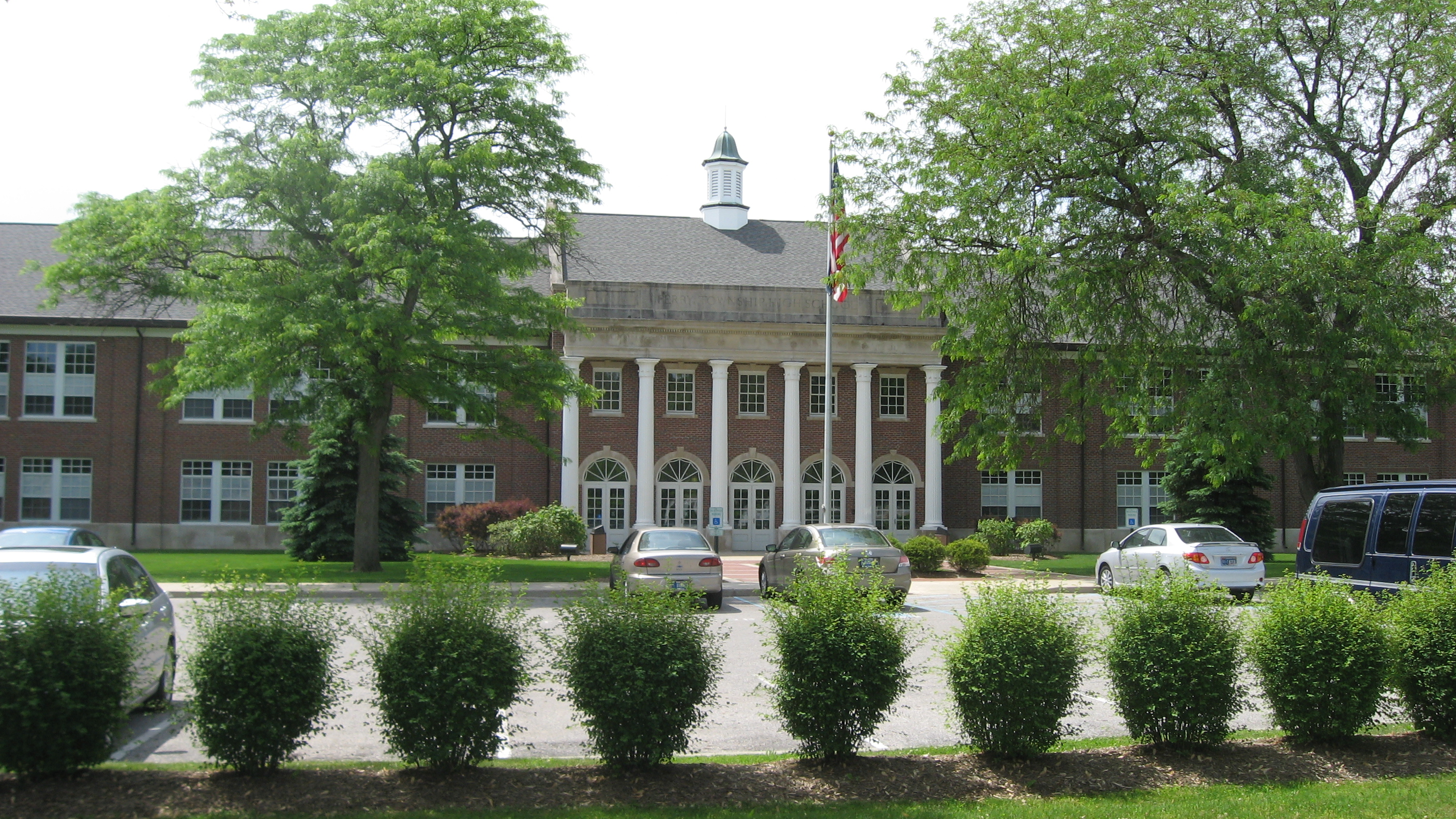
- Old Southport High School, May 2010

- Location within Indianapolis Location within Indiana Location within the United States
- Location: 6548 Orinoco Ave., Indianapolis, Indiana
- Coordinates: 39°40′17″N 86°8′9″W
- Area: 2 acres (0.81 ha)
- Built: 1930
- Built by: Bryant, Roy C.
- Architect: McGuire & Shook
- Architectural style: Colonial Revival
- MPS: Indiana's Public Common and High Schools MPS
- NRHP reference No.: 03000982
- Added to NRHP: September 28, 2003

Old Southport High School, also known as the Old Southport Middle School, is a historic high school building located at Indianapolis, Indiana. It was built in 1930, and is a two-story, U-shaped, Colonial Revival style steel frame and concrete building sheathed in red brick with limestone detailing. It has a side gabled roof topped by an octagonal cupola. The front facade features a grand portico supported by six Corinthian order columns.

It was added to the National Register of Historic Places in 2003.

== See also ==
- National Register of Historic Places listings in Marion County, Indiana
