= George Washington Tomlinson House =

Historic house in Indiana, United States

- U.S. National Register of Historic Places
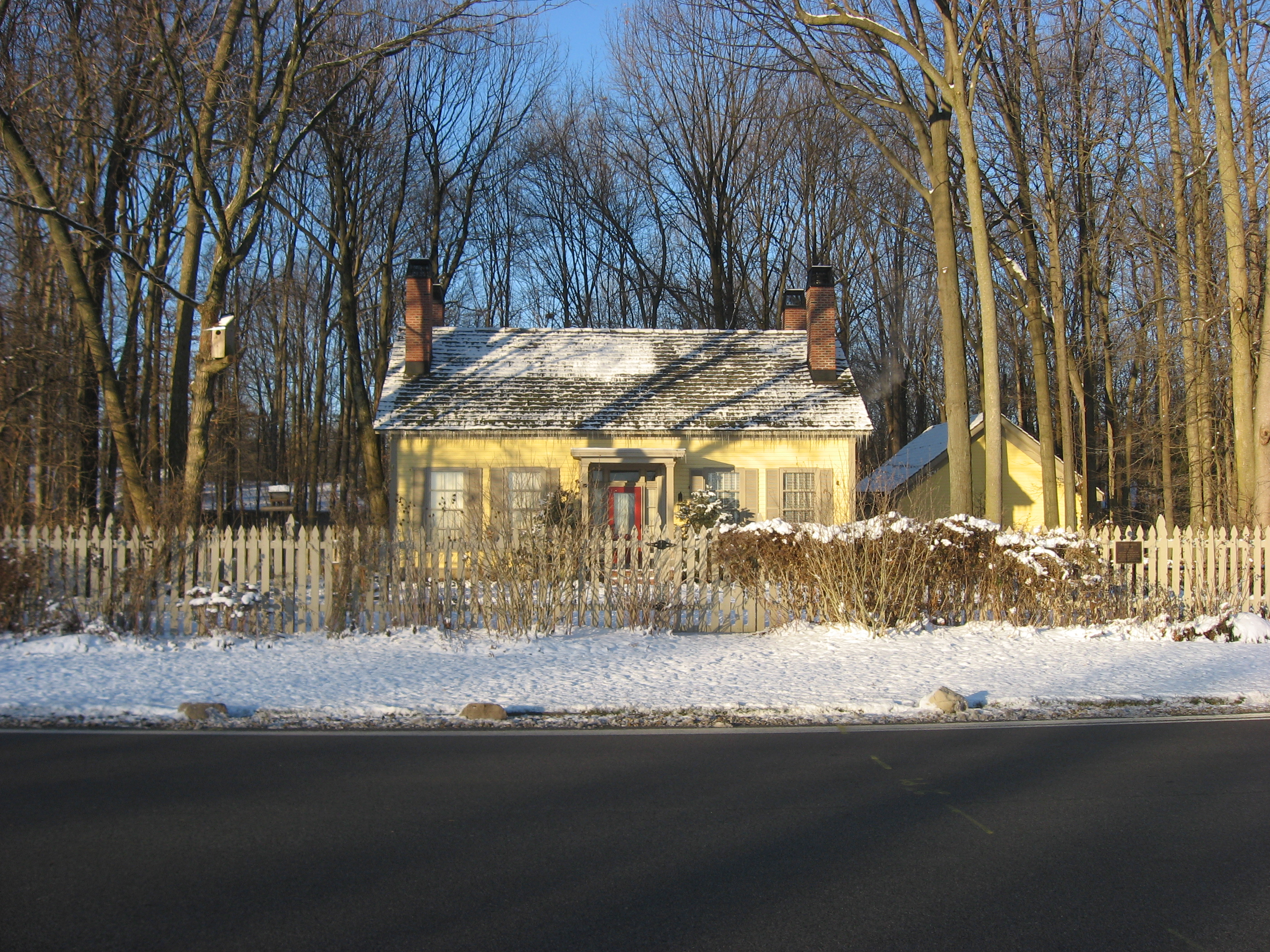
- George Washington Tomlinson House, December 2009

- Location within Indianapolis Location within Indiana Location within the United States
- Location: 5140 Reed Rd., Indianapolis, Indiana
- Coordinates: 39°50′48″N 86°17′24″W
- Area: less than one acre
- Built: c. 1862
- Architectural style: Georgian, Greek Revival
- NRHP reference No.: 05001366
- Added to NRHP: December 6, 2005

George Washington Tomlinson House is a historic home located at Indianapolis, Indiana. It was built about 1862, and is a 1 1/2-story, center passage plan, double pile, frame dwelling with Greek Revival and Georgian style design elements. It is sheathed in clapboard siding, has a side gable roof, and four interior end chimneys. The house was moved to its present site in 1979.

It was added to the National Register of Historic Places in 2005.

== See also ==
- National Register of Historic Places listings in Marion County, Indiana
