= Cotton–Ropkey House =

Historic house in Indiana, United States

- Formerly listed on the U.S. National Register of Historic Places
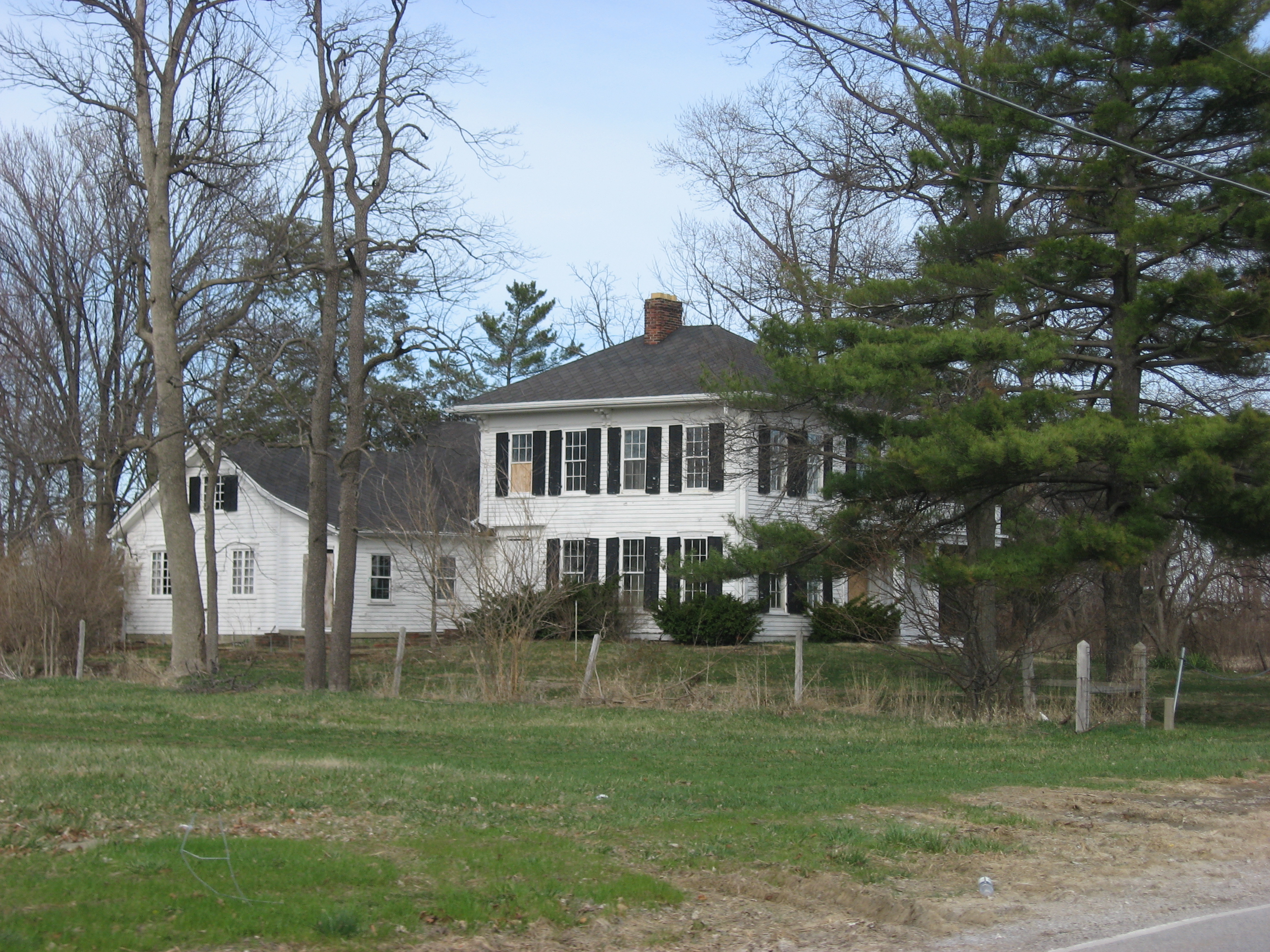
- Cotton-Ropkey House, March 2011

- Location within Indiana Location within the United States
- Location: 6360 W. 79th St., Indianapolis, Indiana
- Coordinates: 39°53′47″N 86°16′24″W
- Area: 5.7 acres (2.3 ha)
- Built: c. 1850
- Architectural style: Greek Revival, Italianate
- NRHP reference No.: 84001086

Significant dates
- Added to NRHP: March 22, 1984
- Removed from NRHP: September 18, 2017

Cotton–Ropkey House, also known as the Ropkey House, is a historic home located at Indianapolis, Indiana. It was built about 1850, and is a two-story, three-bay-by-four-bay, transitional Italianate / Greek Revival style timber frame dwelling. It has a hipped roof and is sheathed in clapboard siding.

It was added to the National Register of Historic Places in 1984, and was delisted in 2017.

== See also ==
- National Register of Historic Places listings in Marion County, Indiana
