= Stewart Manor (Charles B. Sommers House) =

Historic house in Indiana, United States

- U.S. National Register of Historic Places
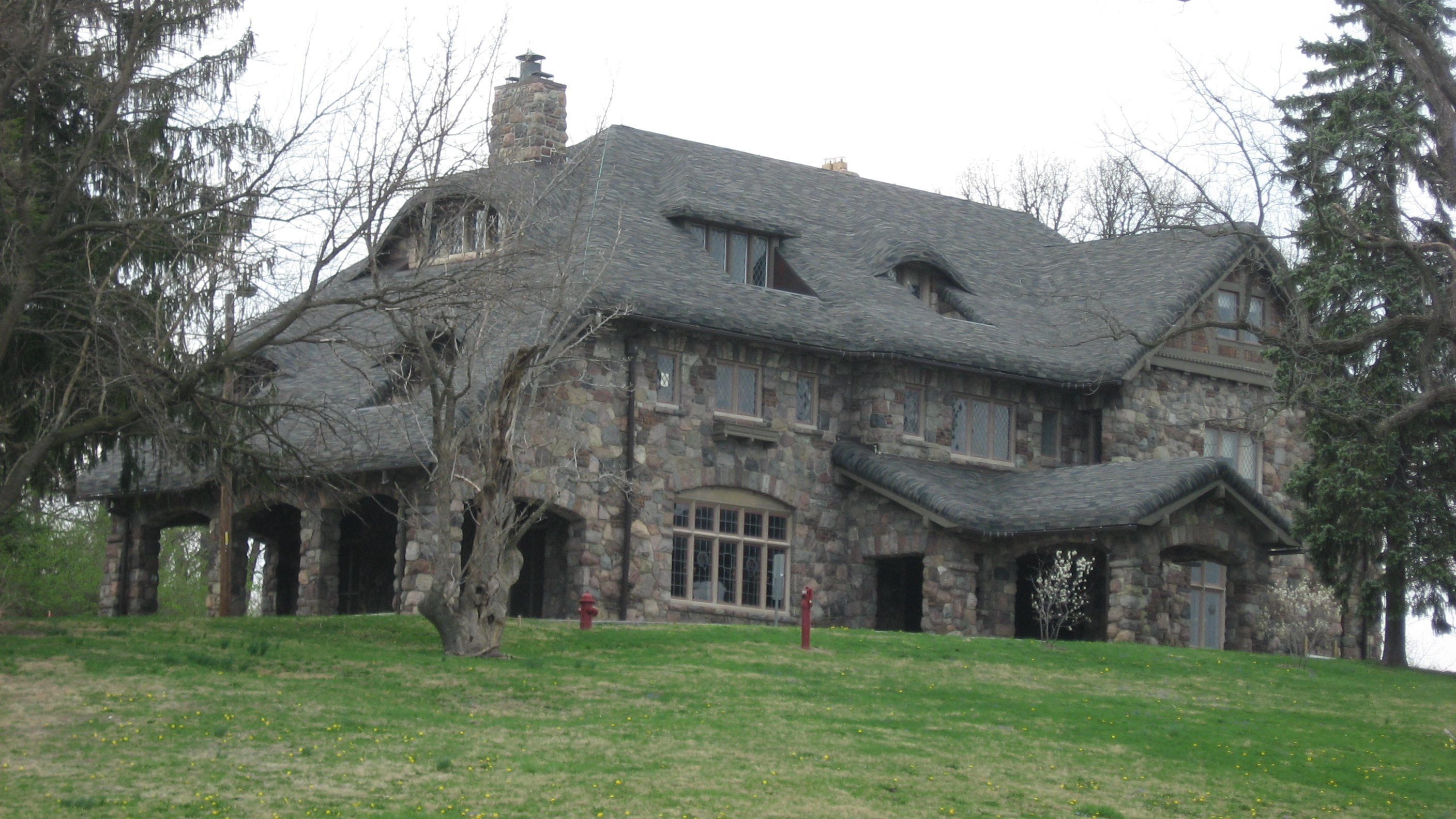
- Stewart Manor, April 2011

- Location within Indianapolis Location within Indiana Location within the United States
- Location: 3650 Cold Spring Rd, Indianapolis, Indiana
- Coordinates: 39°49′14″N 86°12′10″W
- Area: 2 acres (0.81 ha)
- Built: 1923-1924
- Built by: Bedford Stone & Construction
- Architect: Knowton, Bass & Company
- NRHP reference No.: 76000033
- Added to NRHP: October 8, 1976

Stewart Manor (Charles B. Sommers House) is a historic home located at Indianapolis, Indiana. It was built in 1923–1924, and is a large 2 1/2-story, irregularly massed stone mansion. It features a drive through front portico and rounded and segmental arched openings. The house has a shingled gable roof with rounded corners reminiscent of a medieval English country manor.

It was added to the National Register of Historic Places in 1976.

== See also ==
- National Register of Historic Places listings in Marion County, Indiana
