= Carlos and Anne Recker House =

Historic house in Indiana, United States

- U.S. National Register of Historic Places
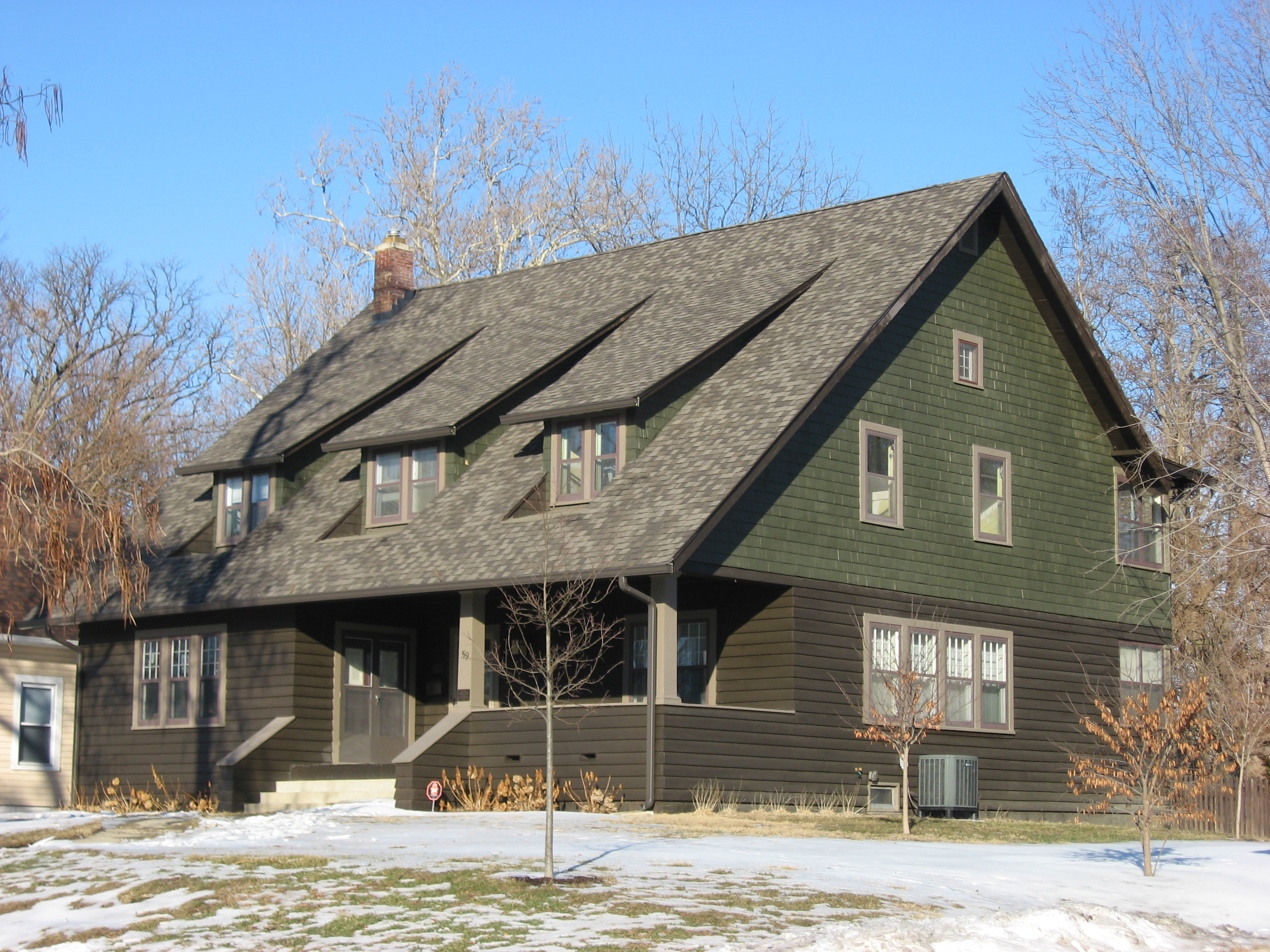
- Carlos and Anne Recker House, February 2011

- Location within Indianapolis Location within Indiana Location within the United States
- Location: 59 N. Hawthorne Ln., Indianapolis, Indiana
- Coordinates: 39°46′19″N 86°3′59″W
- Area: less than one acre
- Built: 1908
- Architect: Craftsman Home Builder's Club
- Architectural style: Bungalow/craftsman
- NRHP reference No.: 96000601
- Added to NRHP: June 13, 1996

Carlos and Anne Recker House, also known as the Recker-Aley-Ajamie House, is a historic home located at Indianapolis, Indiana. It was built in 1908, and is a 1 1/2-story, Bungalow / American Craftsman style frame dwelling. It has a steeply pitched side-gable roof with dormers. The house was built to plans prepared by Gustav Stickley through his Craftsman Home Builder's Club.

It was added to the National Register of Historic Places in 1996.

== See also ==
- National Register of Historic Places listings in Marion County, Indiana
