= Rubush & Hunter =

Former American architectural firm in Indianapolis, Indiana

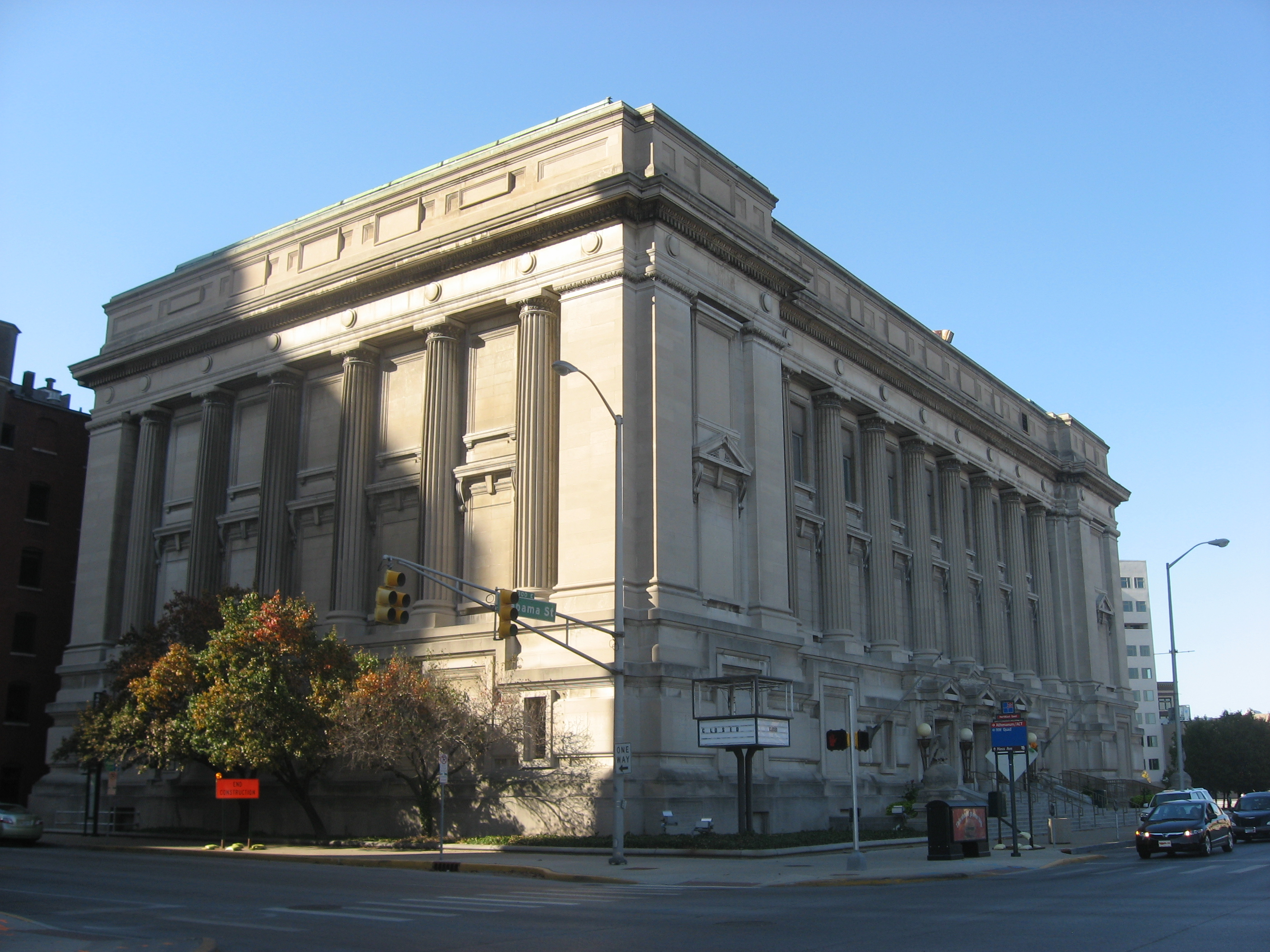
- Indianapolis City Hall, Indianapolis, Indiana, 1909.

Practice information
- Partners: Preston C. Rubush; Edgar O. Hunter
- Founded: 1905
- Dissolved: 1939
- Location: Indianapolis, Indiana

Rubush & Hunter was an architectural firm in Indianapolis, Indiana, in the United States. Established in 1905 by architects Preston C. Rubush and Edgar O. Hunter, Rubush & Hunter operated until 1939.

== Firm history ==
Preston C. Rubush and Edgar O. Hunter formed their partnership in 1905. Previously, Rubush had been a member of the firms of Scharn & Rubush and P. C. Rubush & Company. Rubush and Hunter maintained their partnership until 1939, when both retired. In 1940, the firm was taken over by Philip A. Weisenburgh, chief draftsman and designer of the firm. Weisenburgh retired in 1969.

== Partners ==
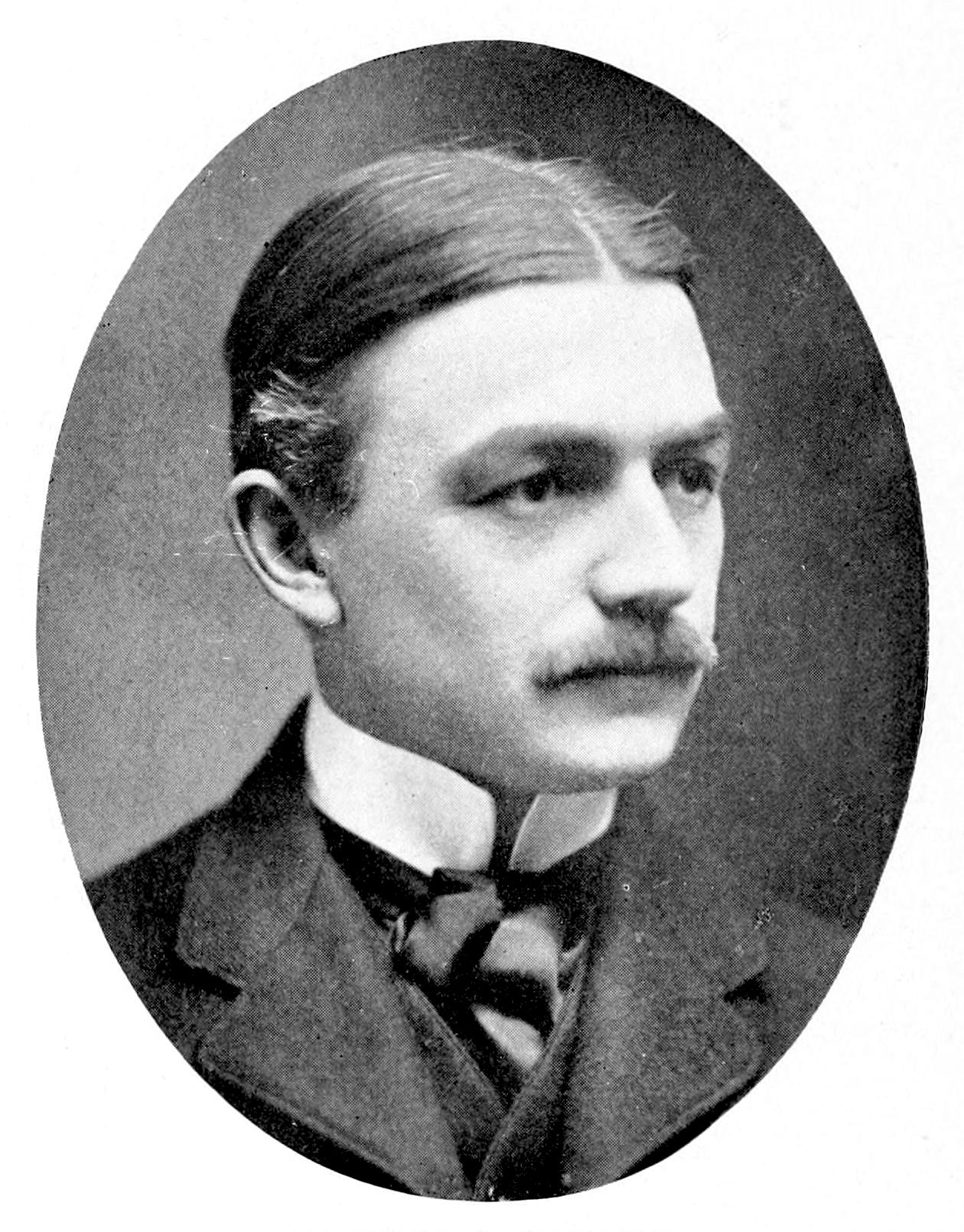
Preston C. Rubush, 1901.

=== Preston C. Rubush ===
Preston C. Rubush was born March 30, 1867, in Oakford, Indiana, to William G. and Marie E. (Wyrick) Rubush. His father was a general contractor. He attended public schools and completed a special course in architecture at the University of Illinois. He initially found employment in the Peoria, Illinois, branch office of architect James F. Alexander, based in Lafayette, Indiana. He worked for Alexander for two years, and then for others until 1893. In that year he came to Indianapolis and formed a partnership, Scharn & Rubush, with John H. Scharn. In 1900, Scharn retired, and Rubush continued the business as P. C. Rubush & Company. In 1905, he formed his partnership with Hunter. They remained together until they retired in 1939.

In 1898, Rubush married Renah J. Wilcox of Nebraska. Rubush died February 4, 1947, at his winter home in Miami Beach, Florida. He was survived by his wife and other family members, but no children.

=== Edgar O. Hunter ===
Edgar Otis Hunter was born in 1873 in Versailles, Indiana. He attended public schools in Indianapolis and the University of Pennsylvania. Upon his return to Indianapolis he worked for Vonnegut & Bohn before joining Rubush. He became partner in the firm in 1905, and like Rubush retired in 1939.

In 1899, Hunter married Anna Blanche Lee. He died in Miami Beach, Florida, on November 20, 1949.

Hunter's younger brother, Frank B. Hunter, was also an architect in Indianapolis.

=== Philip A. Weisenburgh ===
Philip Arthur Weisenburgh was born in 1887 in Frankfort, Kentucky. When he joined Rubush & Hunter is unknown, but he was chief draftsman by 1925. He succeeded to the practice when Rubush and Hunter retired in 1939, He himself retired in 1969. He died in Indianapolis November 12, 1972.

His wife was Louise Weisenburgh, with whom he had a daughter. He was a member of the American Institute of Architects from 1942 until his death.

== Legacy ==
Many of the firm's buildings in Indianapolis have been listed on the United States National Register of Historic Places, and others contribute to listed historic districts.

In addition to their work in Indiana, the firm was hired by Indianapolis developers Carl G. Fisher and Joseph Wesley Young Jr. to do extensive work at their Florida resorts, Miami Beach and Hollywood, respectively. Several of their Hollywood buildings survive, and Rubush and Hunter would both own second homes in Miami Beach.

== Architectural works ==
Year	Building	Address	City	State	Notes	Image	Reference
1905	Knights of Pythias Castle Hall	230 E Ohio St	Indianapolis	Indiana	Presently the Indiana Bar Center.		
1906	Campus development, Indiana School for the Deaf	1200 E 42nd St	Indianapolis	Indiana	Rubush & Hunter were responsible for the initial seven buildings. As of 2020 only Alumni Hall and some service buildings remain. The campus was listed on the National Register of Historic Places in 1991.		
1906	Knights of Pythias Lodge No. 56	121 E Ohio St	Indianapolis	Indiana	Listed on the National Register of Historic Places in 1997 as a contributing property to the Washington Street–Monument Circle Historic District.		
1907	House for William S. Craig	3312 N Washington Blvd	Indianapolis	Indiana	Listed on the National Register of Historic Places in 1990 as a contributing property to the Meridian Park Historic District.		
1907	Odd Fellows Building	1 N Pennsylvania St	Indianapolis	Indiana	Listed on the National Register of Historic Places in 1997 as a contributing property to the Washington Street–Monument Circle Historic District.		
1908	Masonic Temple	525 N Illinois Ave	Indianapolis	Indiana	Listed on the National Register of Historic Places in 2008.		
1908	Kothe, Wells & Bauer Company Building	157 E Maryland St	Indianapolis	Indiana	Listed on the National Register of Historic Places in 1982 as a contributing property to the Indianapolis Union Station-Wholesale District.		
1908	Daniel Stewart Company Building	50 S Meridian St	Indianapolis	Indiana	Listed on the National Register of Historic Places in 1997 as a contributing property to the Washington Street–Monument Circle Historic District.		
1909	The Buckingham	3101-3119 N Meridian St	Indianapolis	Indiana	Listed on the National Register of Historic Places in 1992.		
1909	Indianapolis City Hall (former)	202 N Alabama St	Indianapolis	Indiana	Listed on the National Register of Historic Places in 1974.		
1910	North factory of the H. Lauter Company	35 S Harding St	Indianapolis	Indiana	Listed on the National Register of Historic Places in 2015.		
1910	Sommers Building	143-149 W Washington St	Indianapolis	Indiana	Demolished.		
1911	Hume-Mansur Building	23 E Ohio St	Indianapolis	Indiana	Demolished in 1980.		
1912	University Park Building	333 N Pennsylvania St	Indianapolis	Indiana	In 1929 the building was stripped down to its structure and incorporated into the new Architects and Builders Building. Listed on the National Register of Historic Places in 2019.		
1914	Fidelity Trust Company Building	148 E Market St	Indianapolis	Indiana	Individually listed on the National Register of Historic Places in 1980, and as a contributing property to the Washington Street–Monument Circle Historic District in 1997.		
1915	Henry P. Coburn Public School No. 66	604 E 38th St	Indianapolis	Indiana	Listed on the National Register of Historic Places in 1986.		
1915	Oriental Lodge No. 500	2201 Central Ave	Indianapolis	Indiana	Designed in association with Herbert L. Bass & Company and Herbert W. Foltz. The senior principals of all three firms were members of the lodge. Listed on the National Register of Historic Places in 2016. Presently the Prince Hall Masonic Temple.		
1916	Circle Theatre	45 Monument Circle	Indianapolis	Indiana	Individually listed on the National Register of Historic Places in 1980, and as a contributing property to the Washington Street–Monument Circle Historic District in 1997. Now known as the Hilbert Circle Theatre.		
1919	House for Clark E. Mallery	4160 N Washington Blvd	Indianapolis	Indiana	Listed on the National Register of Historic Places in 2008 as a contributing property to the Washington Park Historic District.		
1920	Nebraska Cropsey School No. 22	1231 S Illinois St	Indianapolis	Indiana	Demolished.		
1920	Flamingo Hotel	1500 Bay Rd	Miami Beach	Florida	Noted hotel architects Price & McClanahan were also hired to prepare a design, but their plans were not used. The hotel was demolished in 1955.		
1920	Manufacturing facilities for the H. C. S. Motor Car Company	1402 N Capitol Ave	Indianapolis	Indiana	Listed on the National Register of Historic Places in 2009.		
1921	Garage for the Hollywood Land and Water Company	2033-2051 Hollywood Blvd	Hollywood	Florida	Remodeled in 1933 into the Ingram Arcade. Listed on the National Register of Historic Places in 1999 as part of the Hollywood Boulevard Historic Business District.		
1921	Hollywood Hotel	Young Circle	Hollywood	Florida	Later known as the Park View Hotel. Demolished.		
1921	Lincoln Hotel	W Washington St and Kentucky Ave	Indianapolis	Indiana	Demolished during the 1970s.		
1922	Guaranty Building	20 N Meridian St	Indianapolis	Indiana	Listed on the National Register of Historic Places in 1997 as a contributing property to the Washington Street–Monument Circle Historic District. The building features architectural carving on the facade by Alexander Sangernebo.		
1922	Masonic Temple (former)	120 W 7th St	Bloomington	Indiana	Listed on the National Register of Historic Places in 1990 as part of the Courthouse Square Historic District.		
1922	Addition to the Murat Shrine (former)	502 N New Jersey St	Indianapolis	Indiana	Listed on the National Register of Historic Places in 1992 as a contributing property to the Massachusetts Avenue Commercial District.		
1923	Stores for the Hollywood Land and Water Company	1940-1948 Hollywood Blvd	Hollywood	Florida	Listed on the National Register of Historic Places in 1999 as part of the Hollywood Boulevard Historic Business District.		
1924	Kagey Home	1650 Harrison Street	Hollywood	Florida	Presently home of the Art and Culture Center Hollywood		
1924	Blue Triangle Hall	725 N Pennsylvania St	Indianapolis	Indiana	Listed on the National Register of Historic Places in 1988.		
1924	Columbia Club	121 Monument Circle	Indianapolis	Indiana	Individually listed on the National Register of Historic Places in 1983, and as a contributing property to the Washington Street–Monument Circle Historic District in 1997. The building features architectural carving on the facade by Alexander Sangernebo.		
1924	Hollywood State Bank Building	2001 Hollywood Blvd	Hollywood	Florida	Listed on the National Register of Historic Places in 1999 as part of the Hollywood Boulevard Historic Business District.		
1924	Reserve Loan Life Insurance Company Building	429 N Pennsylvania St	Indianapolis	Indiana	Listed on the National Register of Historic Places in 1990.		
1925	Hollywood Beach Hotel	101 N Ocean Dr	Hollywood	Florida	Has been stripped of much of its exterior ornament.		
1925	Hollywood Hills Inn	4000 Hollywood Blvd	Hollywood	Florida	Only used as a hotel for one season. Later occupied by the Riverside Military Academy. Demolished.		
1925	House for Joseph W. Young	1055 Hollywood Blvd	Hollywood	Florida	Listed on the National Register of Historic Places in 1989.		
1926	Illinois Building	17 W Market St	Indianapolis	Indiana	Listed on the National Register of Historic Places in 1997 as a contributing property to the Washington Street–Monument Circle Historic District.		
1927	Indiana Theatre	140 W Washington St	Indianapolis	Indiana	Individually listed on the National Register of Historic Places in 1979, and as a contributing property to the Washington Street–Monument Circle Historic District in 1997. The building features architectural carving on the facade by Alexander Sangernebo.		
1927	Madam C. J. Walker Building	617 Indiana Ave	Indianapolis	Indiana	Listed on the National Register of Historic Places in 1980, and a National Historic Landmark in 1991. Now known as the Madam Walker Legacy Center.		
1928	House for Scott C. Wadley	4750 N Meridian St	Indianapolis	Indiana	Since 1973 the house has been the Indiana Governor's Residence.		
1929	Architects and Builders Building	333 N Pennsylvania St	Indianapolis	Indiana	Incorporated the structure of the firm's 1912-built University Park Building. Upon completion the building housed the offices of Rubush & Hunter as well as architects Leslie F. Ayres, Pierre & Wright, contracting firms and architectural and building organizations, among other tenants. Listed on the National Register of Historic Places in 2019.		
1929	Circle Tower	5 E Market St	Indianapolis	Indiana	Listed on the National Register of Historic Places in 1997 as a contributing property to the Washington Street–Monument Circle Historic District.		
1930	Indiana Garage	145 E Market St	Indianapolis	Indiana	Listed on the National Register of Historic Places in 1997 as a contributing property to the Washington Street–Monument Circle Historic District.		
1931	Bottling plant for the Coca-Cola Bottling Company	858-868 Massachusetts Ave	Indianapolis	Indiana	Listed on the National Register of Historic Places in 1992 as a contributing property to the Massachusetts Avenue Commercial District.		
1937	H. P. Wasson & Company Building	2 N Meridian St	Indianapolis	Indiana	Individually listed on the National Register of Historic Places in 1997, and as a contributing property to the Washington Street–Monument Circle Historic District in the same year.		
1938	Remodeling of the Beth-El Zedeck Temple	3359 Ruckle St	Indianapolis	Indiana	Originally designed in 1924 by Vonnegut, Bohn & Mueller. Listed on the National Register of Historic Places in 2019.		
