= American Underslung =

Innovative automobile of 1905-1914 made in Indianapolis

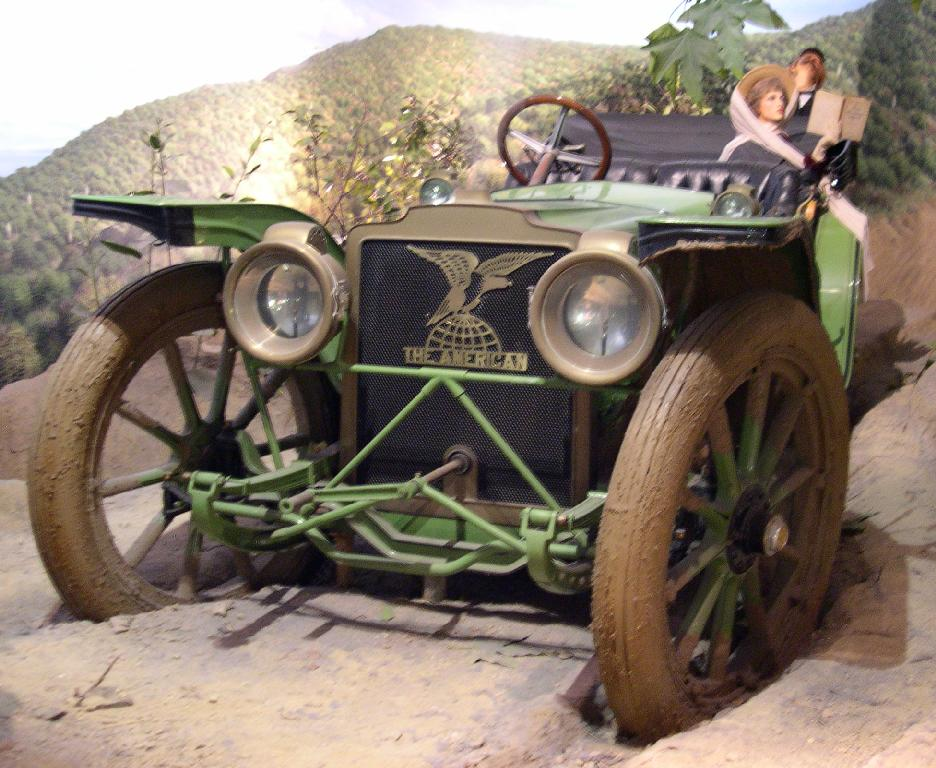
1911 American Underslung in the Petersen Automotive Museum

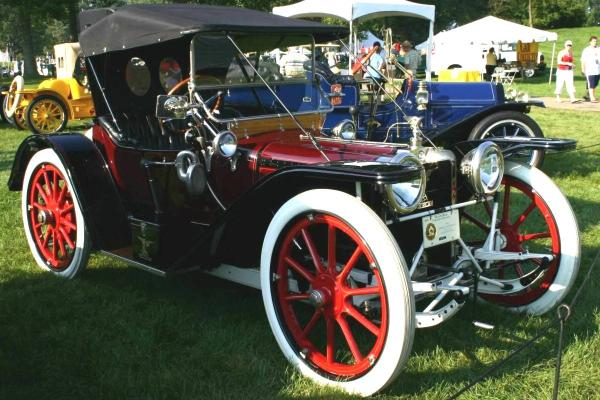
1913 American Underslung

The American Underslung was an American automobile, the brainchild of Harry Stutz and designer Fred Tone, manufactured in Indianapolis from 1905 to 1914 by American Motor Car Company.

== Design ==
The American Underslung's chassis design and huge 40-inch (1,016 mm) wheels gave it a distinctive appearance and it was noticeably lower than other cars from the same era. The chassis was hung below the axles rather than set atop them, with the engine and transmission mass moved closer to the ground lowering the center of gravity and giving sports car appearance and handling. The design mounted the engine and body within the frame rails rather than on the top as with other cars of the era. Developed in collaboration with Harry Stutz, the 1905 Underslung "was one of the most significant, if unsung, automobiles of this century's first decade."

The automobiles were marketed at the upper price range of the market. Prices for the American Underslung ranged from US$1,250 to $4,000. The cars came with Teetor-Harley 6.4 L (391 cu in) straight-4 engines producing 40 hp (30 kW), as measured by an old system, and starting in 1908 a 7.8 L (476 cu in) with 50 hp (37 kW) became available. Additionally, a 9.34 L (570 cu in) six-cylinder engine was capable of 60 hp (45 kW), one of the strongest cars of its time.

== Versions ==
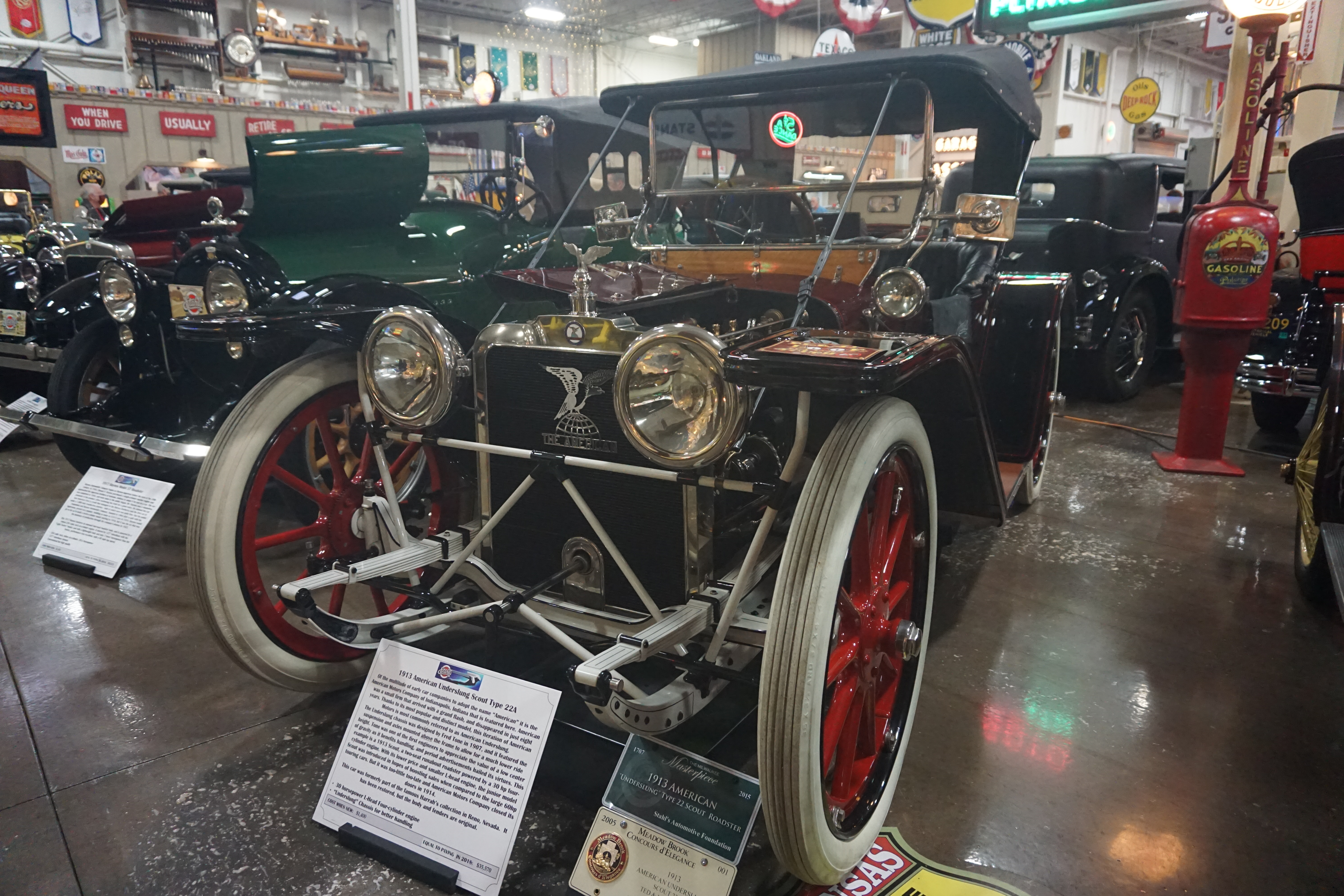
1913 American Underslung Scout Type 22A at Stahls Automotive Collection

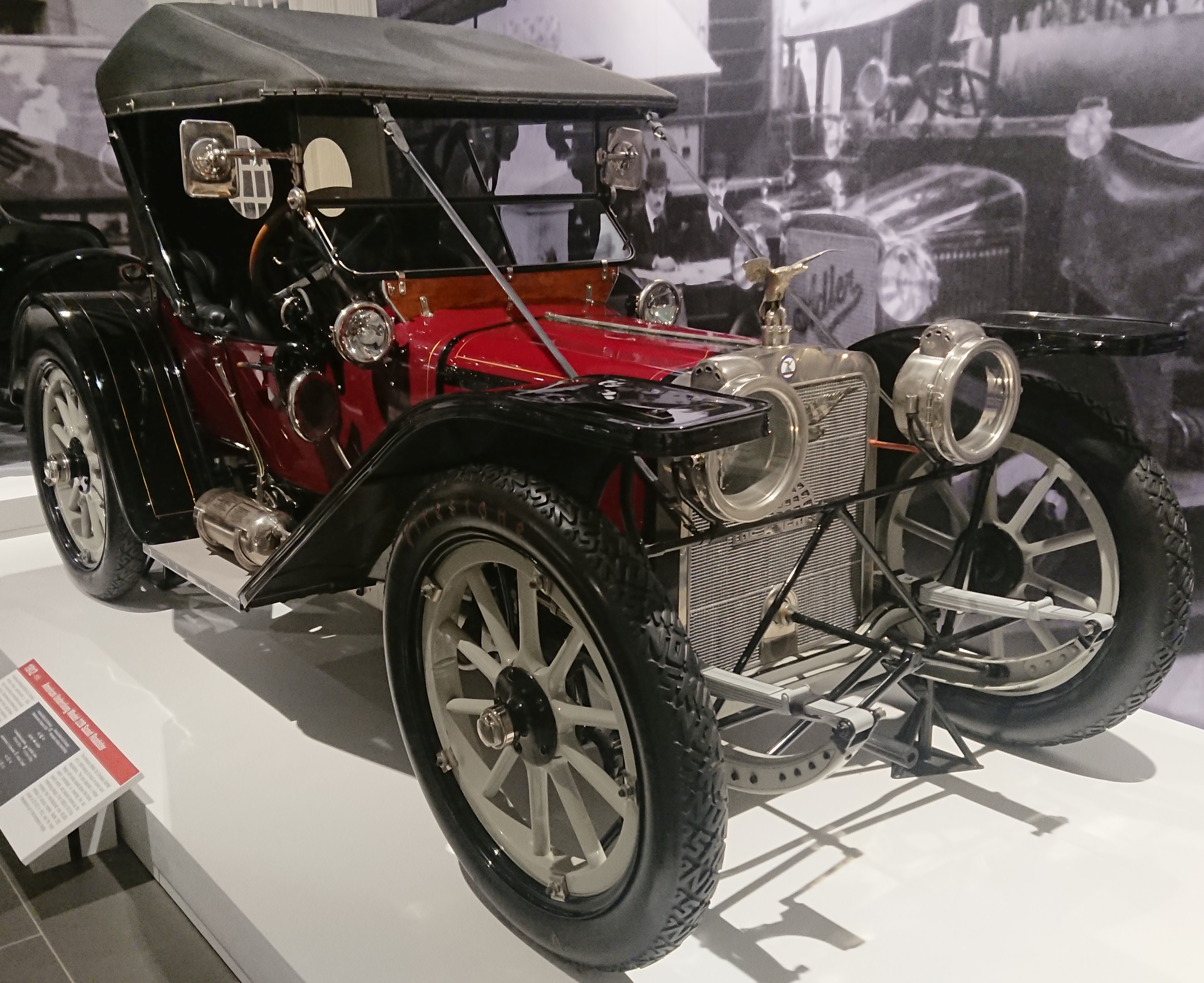
1913 American Underslung Model 22B Scout Roadster

The American Underslung came in several versions:

- A two-door sports version, called the "Scout Roadster".
- Around 1909, American introduced a four-passenger Underslung dubbed "The Traveler." An example of this car, chassis #1687, is on display at the Simeone Foundation Automotive Museum in Philadelphia, PA, USA.
- The car was also available from 1905 to 1908 with a conventional chassis design; this model was called the "American Tourist". It came in another version, a two-door sports version, called the Scout Roadster.

Updates:

- In 1910, the horsepower rating for the engine was increased to 60 hp (45 kW) by enlarging the cylinder bore and adding pressurized lubrication.
- In 1913, electric starters and lights became available on the Underslungs.

== Closure ==
The American Underslung marketing slogan was "The Car For The Discriminating Few" and apparently there were few buyers. Although new models were introduced for 1914 and the company continued to boast the American Underslung was "America’s Most Luxurious Car", the end came when the firm was put into receivership in November 1913.
