= HCS Motor Car Company Building =

- HCS Motor Car Company
- U.S. National Register of Historic Places
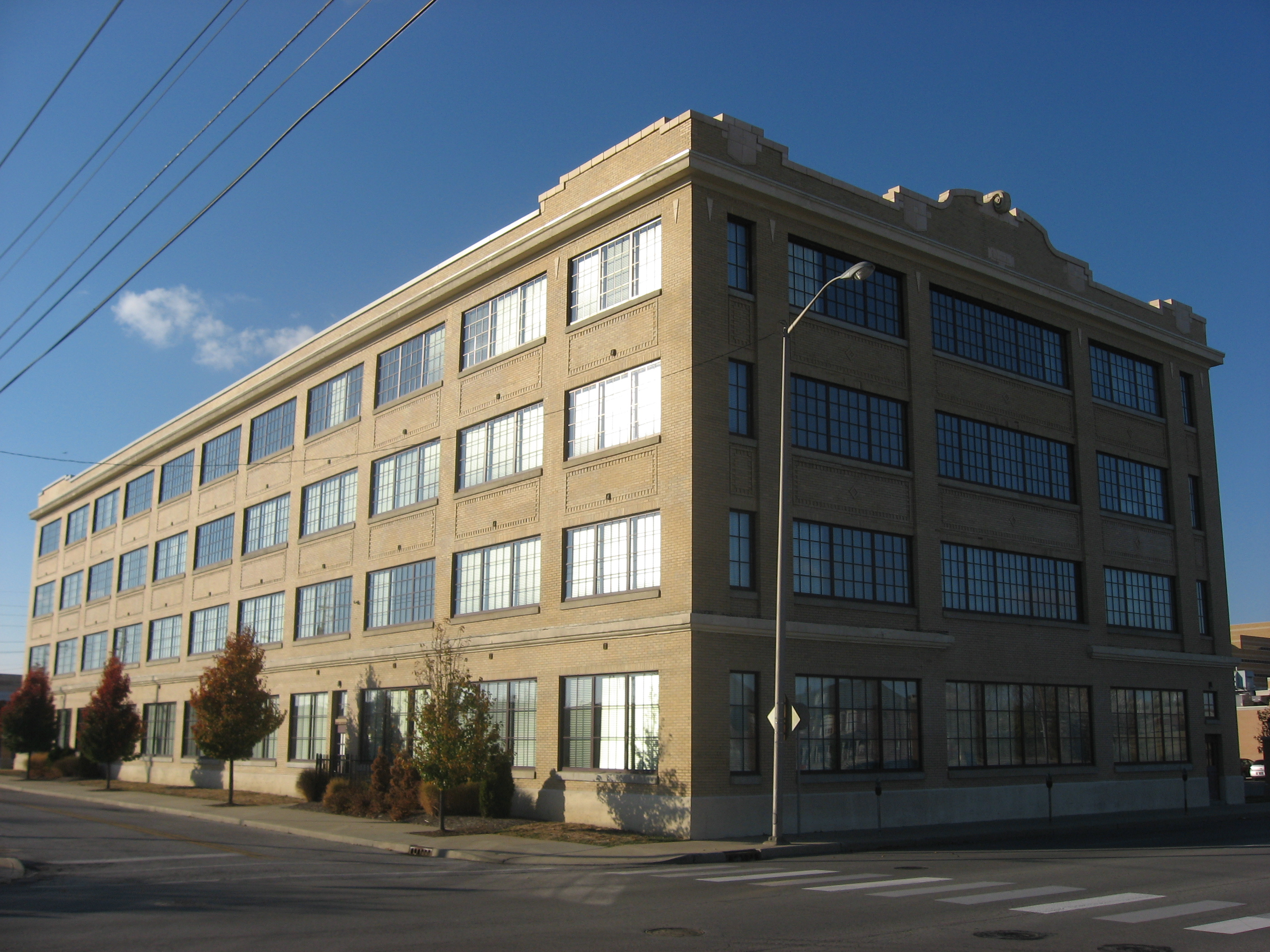
- HCS Motor Car Company Building, November 2010

- Location within Indianapolis Location within Indiana Location within the United States
- Location: 1402 N. Capitol Ave., Indianapolis, Indiana
- Coordinates: 39°47′18″N 86°9′42″W
- Area: less than one acre
- Built: 1920-1921
- Architect: Hunter, Edgar O.; Rubush, Preston C.
- Architectural style: Classical Revival
- NRHP reference No.: 09000432
- Added to NRHP: June 17, 2009

H. C. S. Motor Car Company Building, also known as S. Cohn & Son Inc. and Capital View, is a historic industrial / commercial building located at Indianapolis, Indiana. It was designed by Rubush & Hunter and built in 1920-1921 for its namesake, the H. C. S. Motor Car Company. It is a four-story, rectangular Classical Revival style, reinforced concrete building. It has buff-colored brick curtain walls. It was originally built to house an automobile assembler, supplier, and showroom. The building was renovated for office usage between 2005 and 2007.

It was listed on the National Register of Historic Places in 2009.

== See also ==
- National Register of Historic Places listings in Center Township, Marion County, Indiana
