= The Buckingham (Indianapolis, Indiana) =

- U.S. National Register of Historic Places
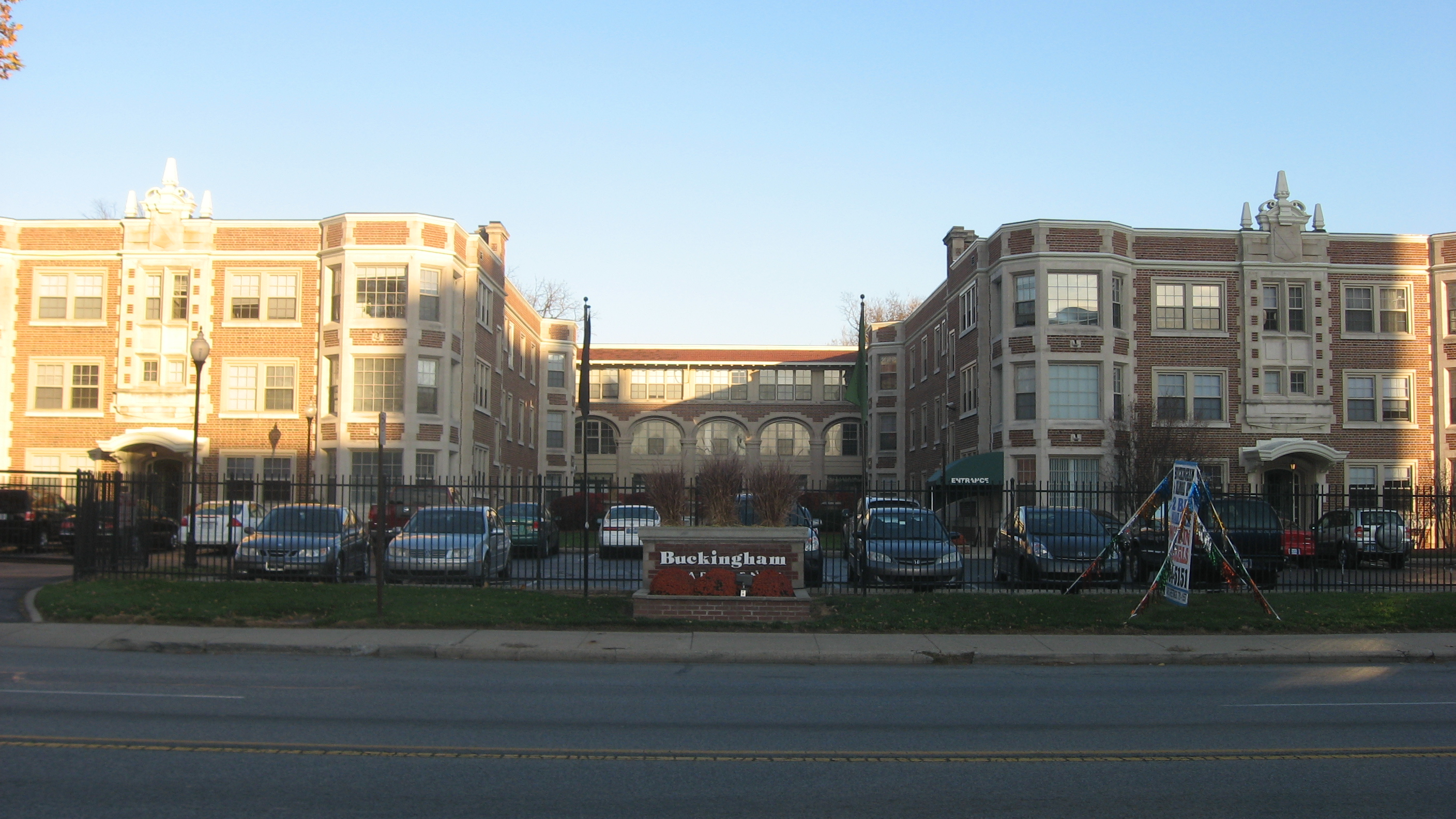
- Front of the Buckingham

- Location within Indianapolis Location within Indiana Location within the United States
- Location: 3101-3119 N. Meridian St., Indianapolis, Indiana
- Coordinates: 39°48′44″N 86°9′22″W
- Area: 1.2 acres (0.49 ha)
- Built: 1909
- Architect: Rubush & Hunter
- Architectural style: Bungalow/craftsman, Tudor Revival
- NRHP reference No.: 92001649
- Added to NRHP: November 27, 1992

The Buckingham is a historic apartment building located at Indianapolis, Indiana. It was built in 1909–1910, and is a three-story, U-shaped, Tudor Revival style brown-red brick building with limestone trim. It features four-sided turrets framing the three-bay entrance facade with loggia and oriel windows.

It was listed on the U.S. National Register of Historic Places in 1992.

== See also ==
- National Register of Historic Places listings in Center Township, Marion County, Indiana
