= Reserve Loan Life Insurance Company =

- U.S. National Register of Historic Places
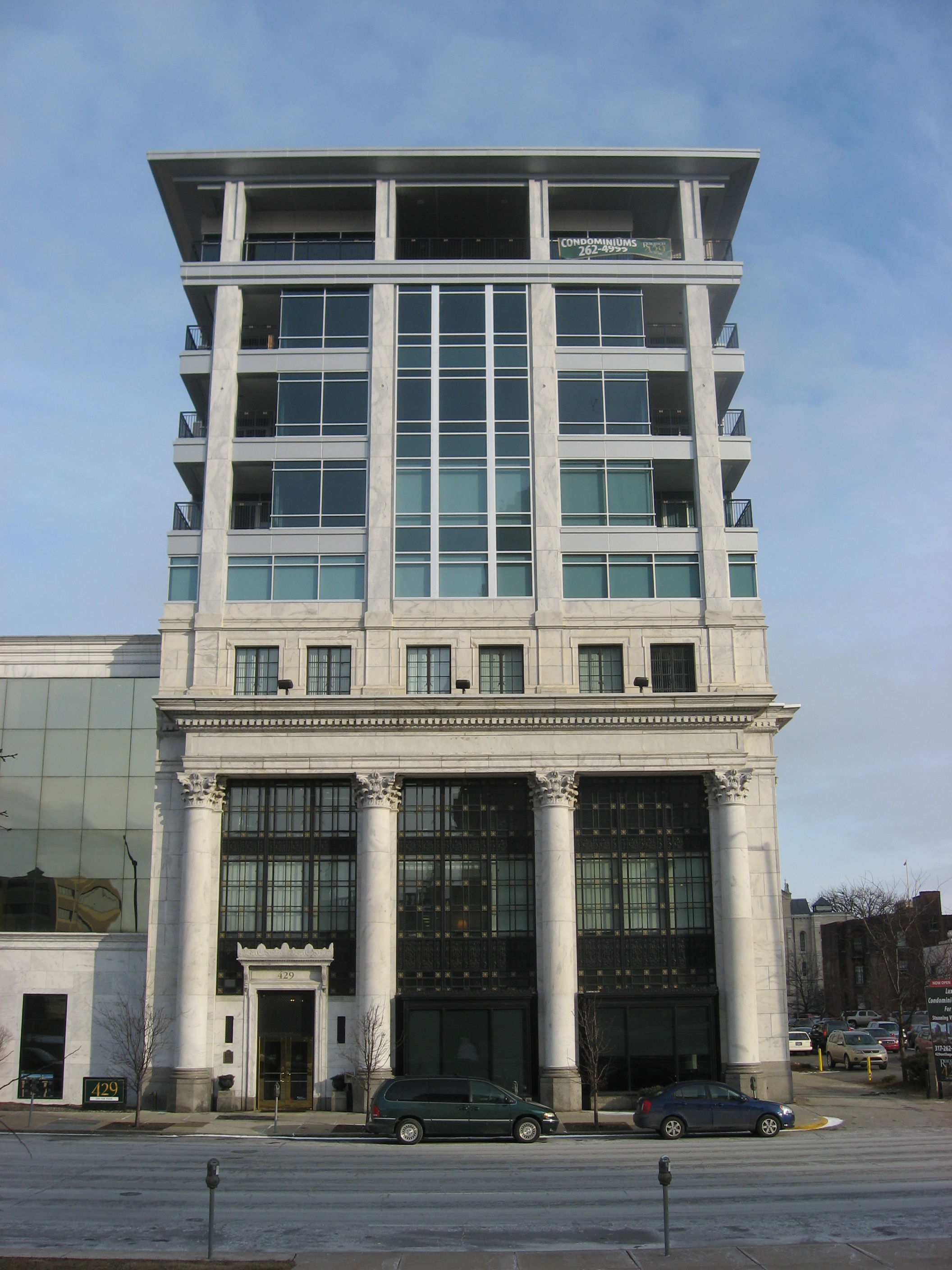
- Reserve Loan Life Insurance Company, January 2010

- Location within Indianapolis Location within Indianapolis Location within Indiana Location within the United States
- Location: 429 N. Pennsylvania St., Indianapolis, Indiana
- Coordinates: 39°46′29″N 86°9′20″W
- Area: less than one acre
- Built: 1924-1925
- Architect: Rubush & Hunter; Jungclaus, William
- Architectural style: Classical Revival
- NRHP reference No.: 90000331
- Added to NRHP: February 23, 1990

Reserve Loan Life Insurance Company is a historic commercial building located at Indianapolis, Indiana. It was built in 1924–1925, and is a four-story, Classical Revival style reinforced concrete building, with a three-story, white marble temple front. It features Corinthian order columns. The building was rehabilitated in 1987. Additional stories were added later and the building converted to a condominium complex.

It was listed on the National Register of Historic Places in 1990.

== See also ==
- National Register of Historic Places listings in Center Township, Marion County, Indiana
