= American Motor Car Company =

Indianapolis, IN, automobile manufacturer, active 1906-1913

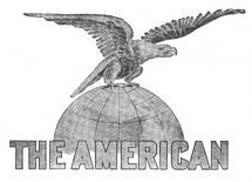
- Industry: Automobile
- Founded: 1906; 120 years ago
- Defunct: 1913; 113 years ago
- Fate: bankrupt
- Headquarters: Indianapolis, Indiana, United States
- Key people: Harry C. Stutz; Fred L. Tone
- Products: automobiles

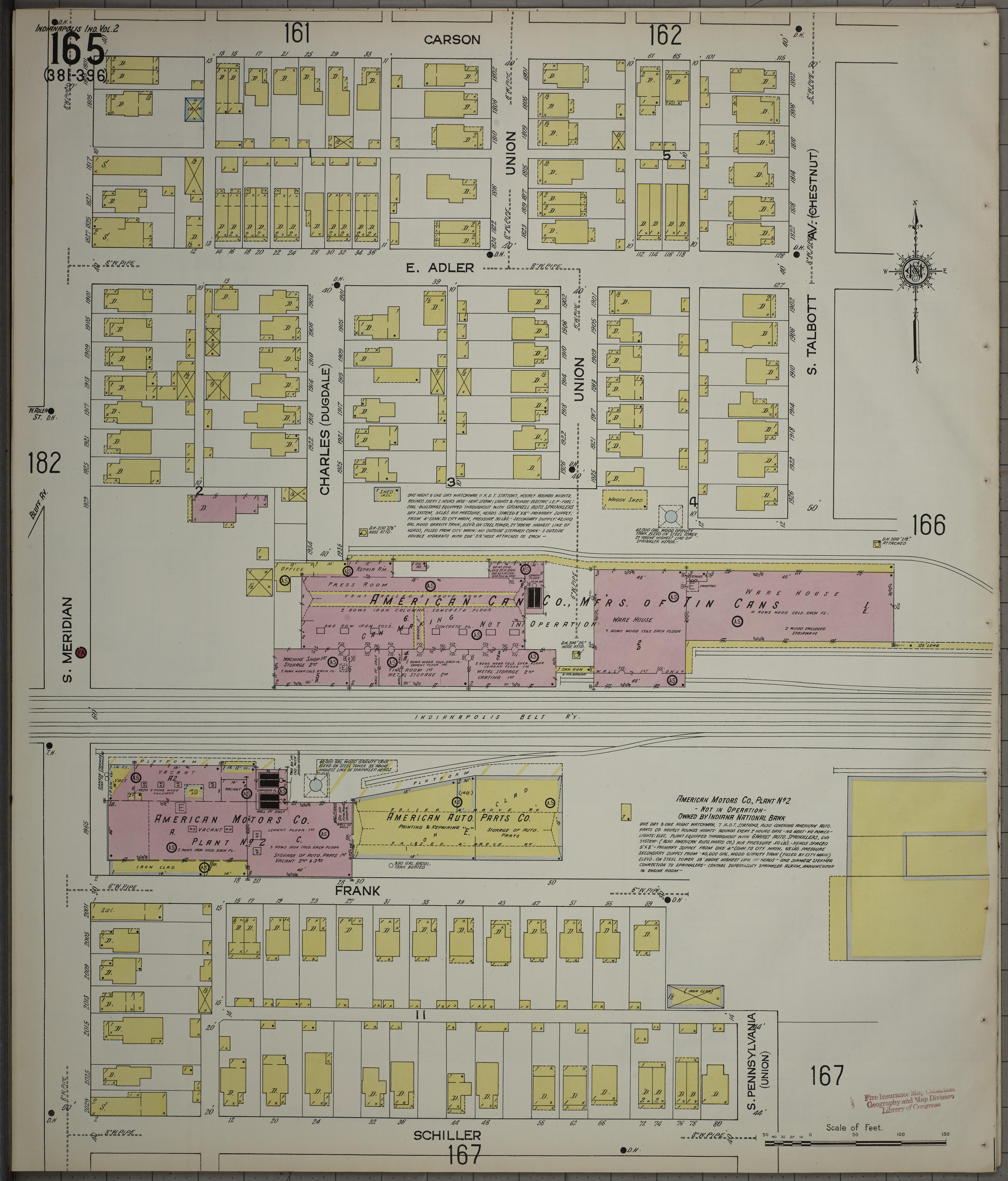
American Motor Car Company Plant No. 2. After the company went bankrupt in November 1913, the buildings were owned by the Indiana National Bank in 1914.

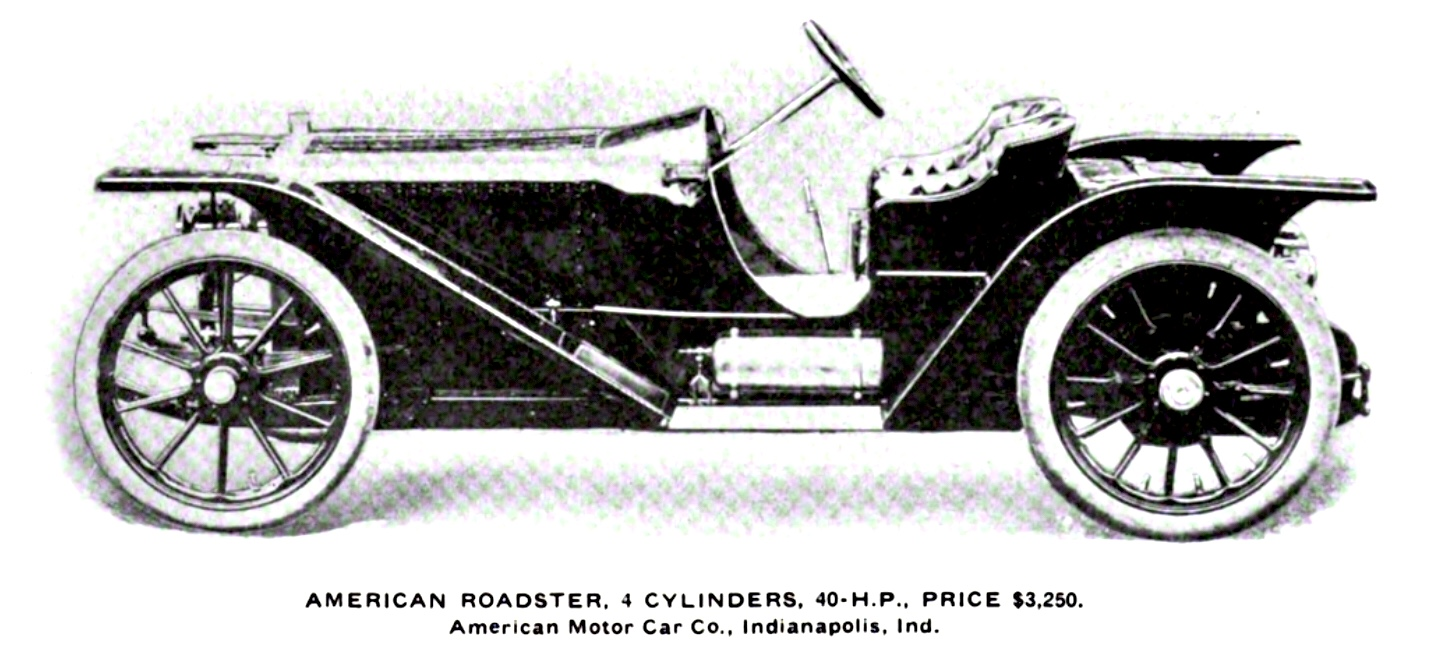
American Roadster (1908)

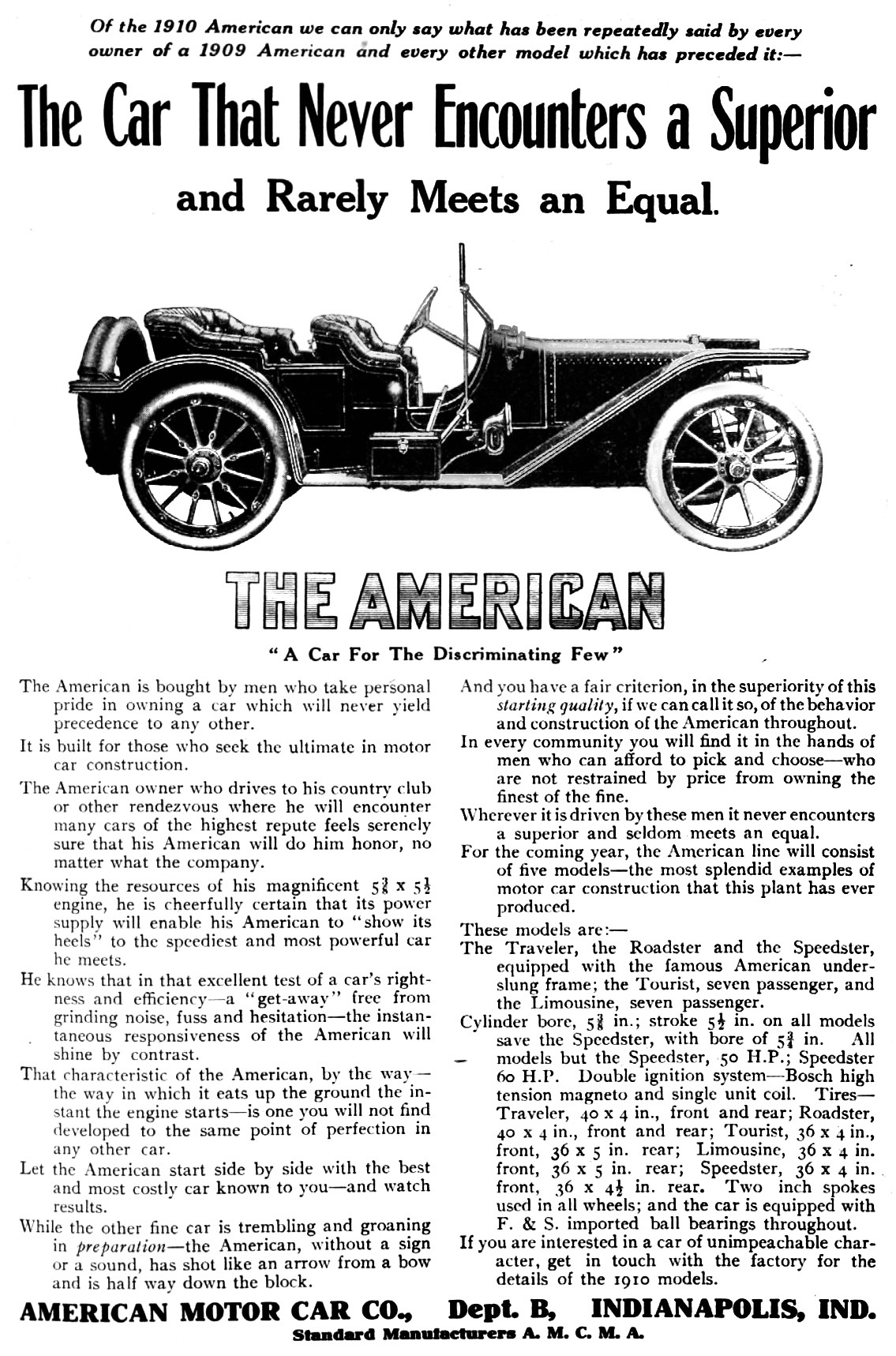
American Motor Car Company advertisement (1909)

The American Motor Car Company was a short-lived company in the automotive industry founded in 1906, lasting until 1913. It was based in Indianapolis, Indiana, United States. The American Motor Car Company pioneered the "underslung" design.

== History ==
Harry C. Stutz, who later formed a company bearing his name, designed the first car for the new enterprise. However, Stutz quickly left and Fred L. Tone took over as chief engineer in 1906. Tone re-designed the chassis (frame) below the axles and the semi-elliptic leaf spring suspension system mounted above.

This upside-down or reverse arrangement became known as the underslung design. It gave the vehicles a lower stance and was an industry first. Because of the lower chassis position, 40 in (1,000 mm) wheels gave the vehicle space between the frame and the ground. The company claimed that the vehicles were safe from rollovers and could be tilted up to 55 degrees.

It was powered by a 6.4 L (390.6 cu in) engine rated at 40 horsepower (by the measurements at that time), but the car was underpowered. By 1908, the engine was enlarged to 7.8 L (476.0 cu in) producing 50 bhp (37 kW). The company entered a large engined roadster in the Savannah Challenge Cup Race held in Savannah, Georgia, but it finished last.

Facing financial problems during 1911, the name was changed to American Motor Company.

In 1912 all of its models featured the distinctive underslung chassis and the cars were officially named American Underslung. However, the new company was still over-extended and inefficient. The relatively small production of its numerous models was divided among three factories.

The company went into bankruptcy in November 1913.

Over an eight-year period, the American Motor Company had produced over 45,000 vehicles.

Like many other automakers during this era, ineffective assembly processes, questionable management practices, as well as a focus on high quality plagued it and expensive models when the market was moving to lower priced utilitarian cars.

== Production models ==
- American Model F (1906)
- American Model G (1907)
- American Model 40 (1908)
- American Model 50 (1908–1911)
- American Model 60 (1911)
- American Traveler (1912)
- American Tourist (1912)
- American Scout (1912) Roadster
- American Model 54 A Traveler (1913)
- American Model 56 A (1913) Torpedo Touring seven seater
- American Model 34 A (1913) Touring
- American Model 32 A (1913) Roadster
- American Model 22 A (1913) Torpedo Roadster
- American Model 22 B (1913) Touring
- American Type 422 (1913–1914) Roadster
- American Type 642 (1914) Roadster
- American Type 644 (1914) Touring
- American Type 666 (1914) Touring

== Gallery ==
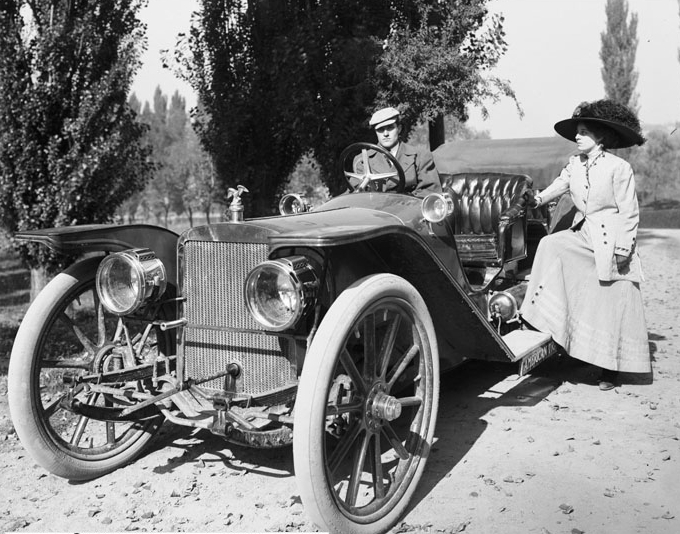
1909 American Traveler

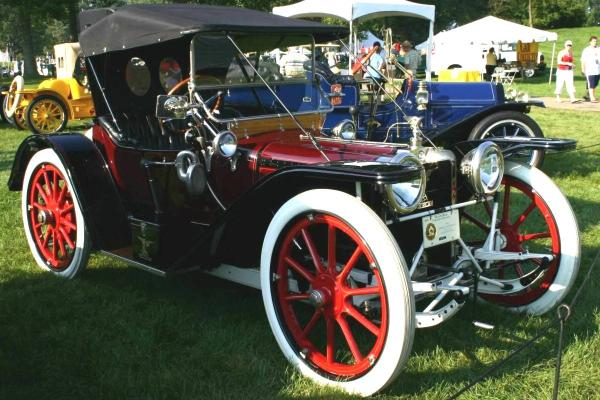
1913 American Underslung

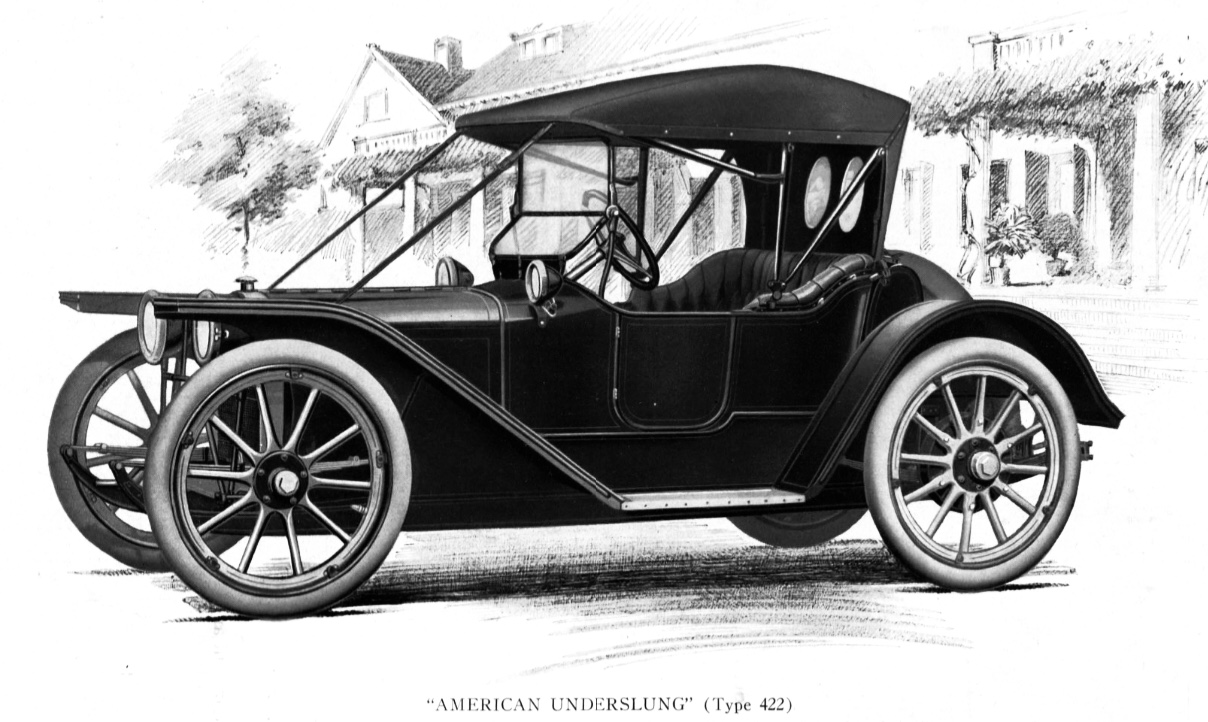
American Underslung Type 422 (1913–1914)

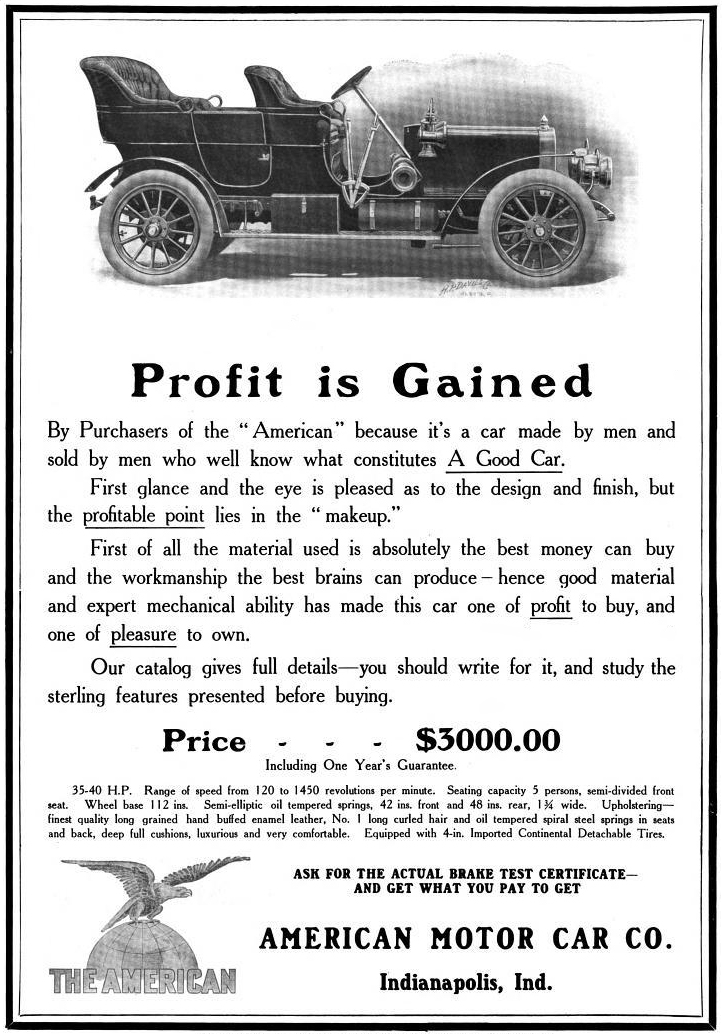
American Motor Car Company of Indianapolis, Indiana – "The American" – 1906

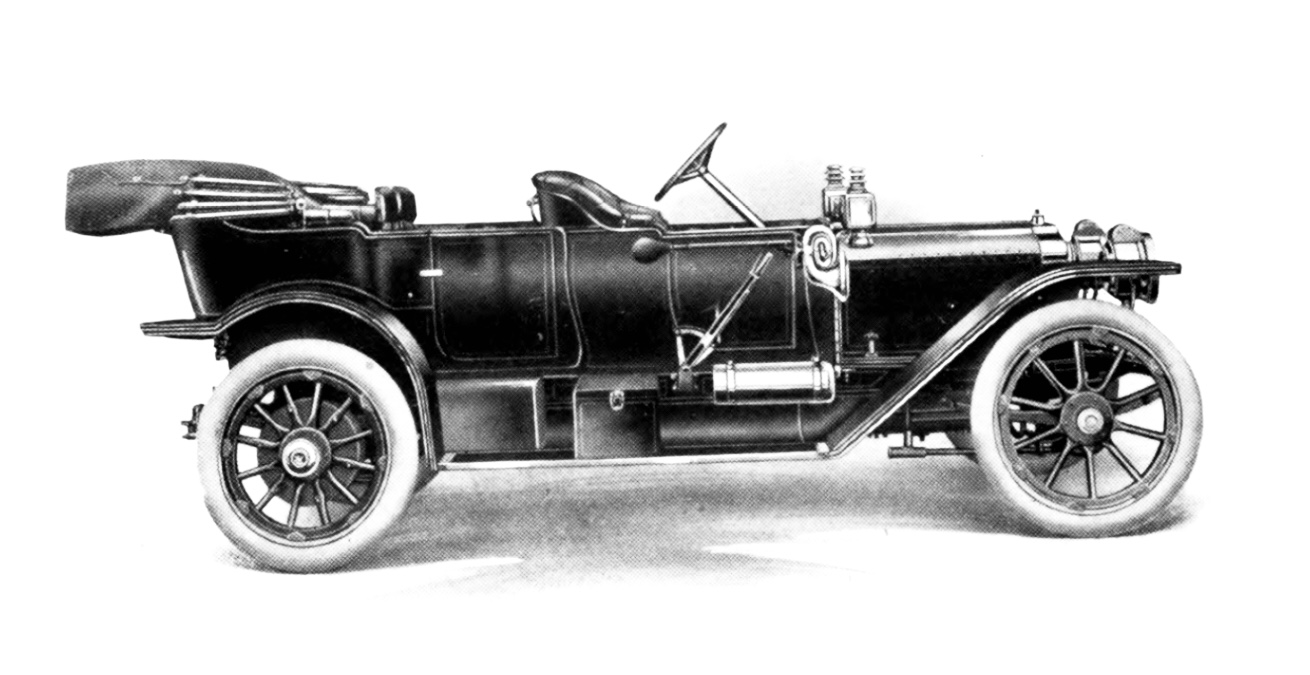
American Tourist (1912)
