= Henry P. Coburn Public School No. 66 =

- U.S. National Register of Historic Places
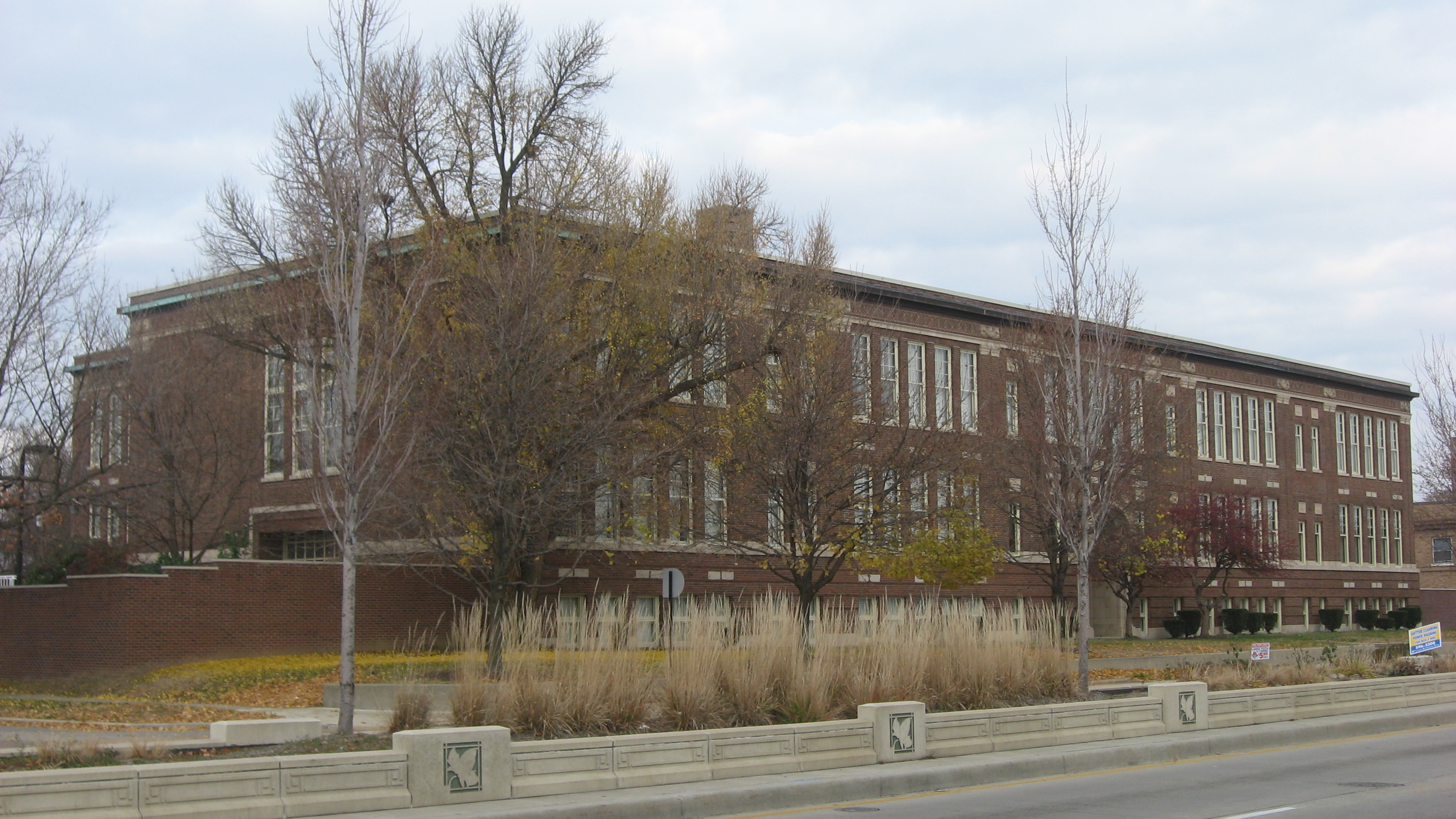
- Henry P. Coburn Public School No. 66, November 2010

- Location within Indianapolis Location within Indiana Location within the United States
- Location: 604 E. Thirty-eighth St., Indianapolis, Indiana
- Coordinates: 39°49′31″N 86°8′47″W
- Area: less than one acre
- Built: 1915, 1929
- Built by: Jungclaus, W. P.
- Architect: Rubush & Hunter; Harrison & Turnock
- Architectural style: Late 19th And 20th Century Revivals, Mediterranean
- NRHP reference No.: 86001267
- Added to NRHP: June 13, 1986

Henry P. Coburn Public School No. 66 is a historic elementary school building located at Indianapolis, Indiana. It was built in 1915, and is a two-story, rectangular, Mediterranean Revival style brown brick building on a raised basement. It has limestone coping and buff terra cotta trim. An addition was constructed in 1929.

It was added to the National Register of Historic Places in 1986.

== See also ==
- National Register of Historic Places listings in Marion County, Indiana
