= Central Court Historic District =

Historic district of Indianapolis, Indiana

- U.S. National Register of Historic Places
- U.S. Historic district
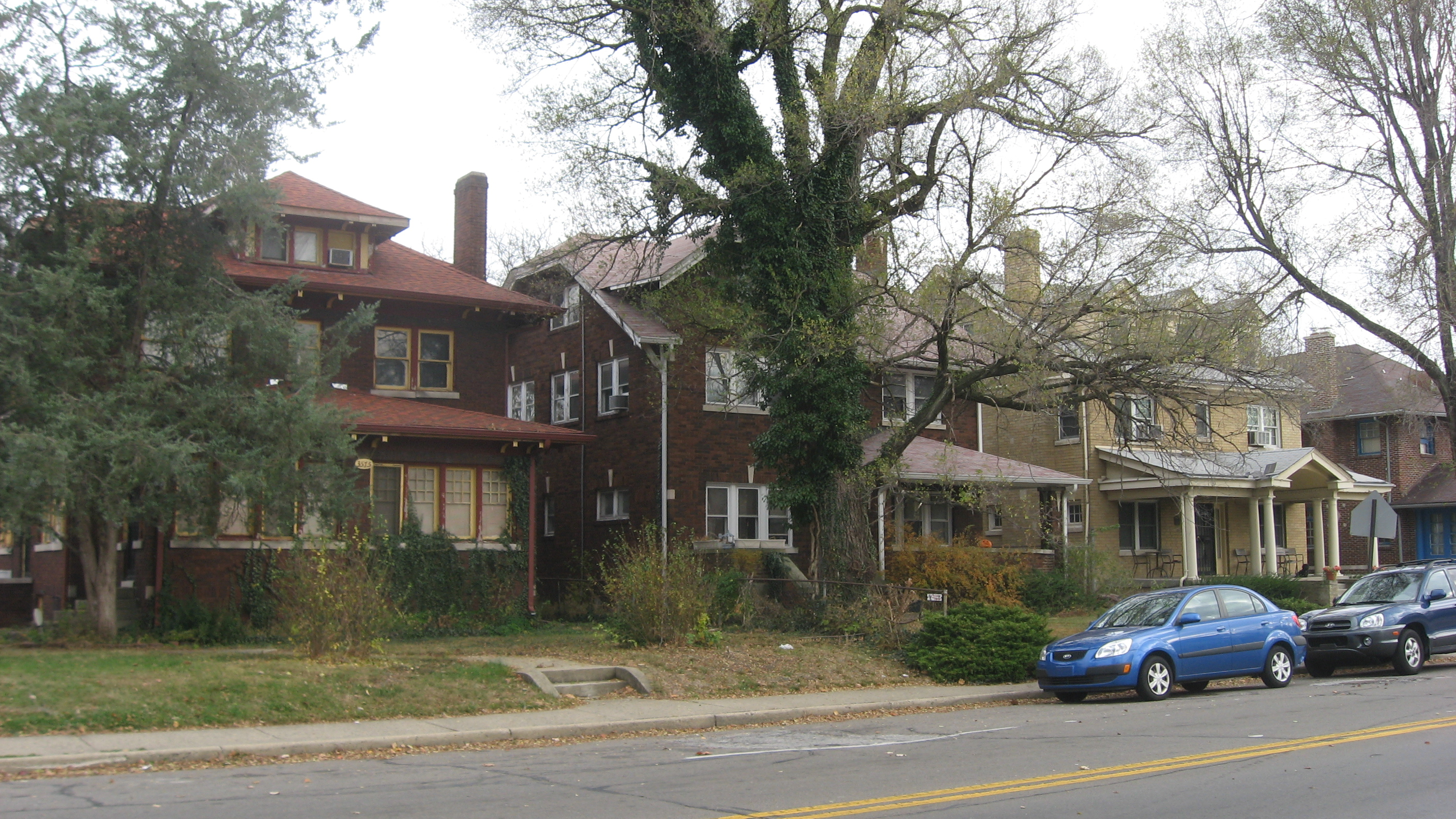
- Houses on Central Avenue in the district

- Location within Indianapolis Location within Indiana Location within the United States
- Location: 3529-3575 Central Ave., 515-551 E. 36th St. and Central Ct., Indianapolis, Indiana
- Coordinates: 39°49′20″N 86°8′53″W
- Area: 9.3 acres (3.8 ha)
- Architect: Oscar A. Jose; Peter Balz
- Architectural style: Prairie School, Bungalow/Craftsman
- NRHP reference No.: 04001101
- Added to NRHP: September 29, 2004

The Central Court Historic District is a historic district and neighborhood of the city of Indianapolis, Indiana, United States. Built around Central Court near the intersection of 36th Street and Central Avenue, the neighborhood consists of seventy-five buildings over an area of 7.6 acres (3.1 ha).

Central Court was platted in 1916 by Oscar A. Jose and Peter J. Balz, local real estate developers who also created such neighborhoods as Meridian Park to the southwest and the neighborhood lining Fall Creek Parkway between Thirty-eighth and Thirtieth Streets. They employed a range of architectural styles for the houses in the neighborhood, including American Craftsman, Colonial Revival, Dutch Colonial Revival, and Prairie School. Many designs were used multiple times in the neighborhood, which has been recognized as one of the area's better examples of early twentieth-century residential architecture. They built forty-seven houses around the U-shaped Central Court and along Thirty-sixth Street and Central Avenue; seven face Central Avenue, ten face Thirty-sixth Street, and thirty face Central Court.

In 2004, Central Court was designated a historic district and listed on the National Register of Historic Places. It is by far the smallest historic district in its portion of the city, being dwarfed by areas such as Meridian Park a short distance to the southwest.

== See also ==
- National Register of Historic Places listings in Center Township, Marion County, Indiana
