= Beth-El Zedeck Temple =

- U.S. National Register of Historic Places
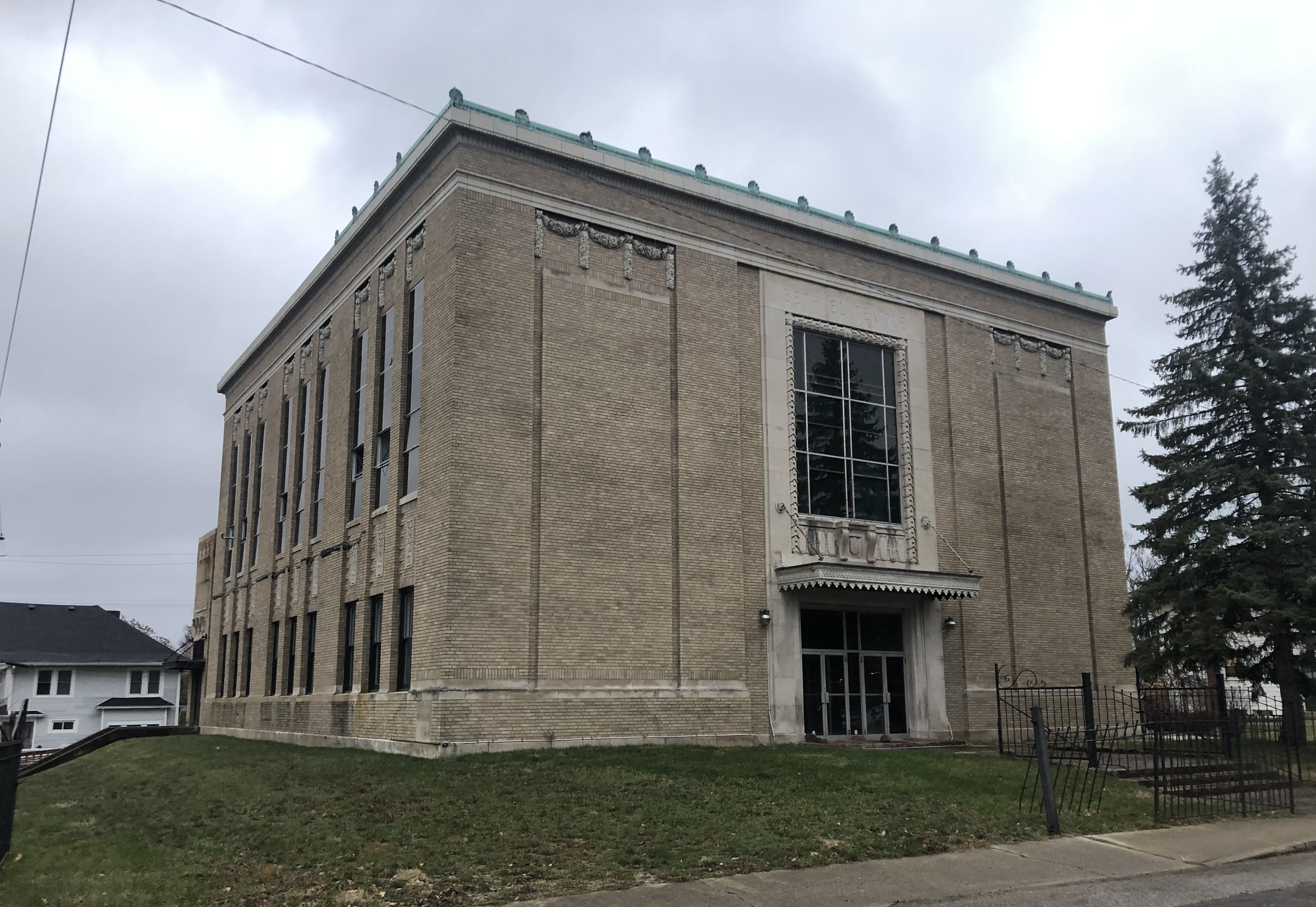
- Beth-El Zedeck Temple

- Location within Indianapolis Location within Indiana Location within the United States
- Location: 3359 Ruckle St., Indianapolis, Indiana
- Coordinates: 39°49′3″N 86°8′55″W
- Area: 0.3 acres (0.12 ha)
- Built: 1924
- Architect: Vonnegut, Bohn & Mueller
- Architectural style: Neoclassical Revival
- NRHP reference No.: 100004362
- Added to NRHP: August 28, 2019

Beth-El Zedeck Temple, originally known as Beth-El Temple, is a historic synagogue located in the Mapleton-Fall Creek neighborhood in Indianapolis, Indiana, United States. The building was completed in 1924, and was originally home to Congregation Beth-El before merging with the Ohev Zedeck congregation in 1928. It is the oldest remaining synagogue structure in Indianapolis.

The building is a two-story, neoclassical structure with a brick exterior and flat roof. It has a terra cotta cornice and ornamental pedestals throughout the roof line. Its entrance features a decorative canopy over the front doors, which is suspended to the building by two steel tension cables. The interior features a large sanctuary space on the second floor and classrooms on the first floor.

The temple was added to the National Register of Historic Places in 2019.

== History ==
Congregation Beth-El was formed in 1915 when a small group of Jewish congregants began meeting in a rented house at 16th and Illinois Streets in Indianapolis. The following year, attendance had grown and the group rented a larger home at 21st and Talbott Streets. The congregation incorporated in 1921.

The congregation chose a property at the southeast corner of 34th and Ruckle Streets for its new synagogue, as the area had a growing Jewish population. The building was dedicated on December 12, 1925, the first night of Hanukah. Governor Edward L. Jackson attended the dedication ceremony.

Congregation Beth-El Zedeck occupied the building until 1958 when it moved north to a new location in the Indianapolis enclave suburb of Meridian Hills, Indiana. Congregation B'nai Torah then occupied the building until 1967. More recently, the building housed various Christian churches, but as of March 2025, it has been vacant for about 20 years. Indiana Landmarks purchased the building in 2014.

Police arrested trespassers who were shooting a rap video in the building in March 2025.

== Restoration ==
Indiana Landmarks, a private historic preservation organization, purchased the building in 2014. Indiana Landmarks raised funds to replace the structure's roof, which had a large hole exposing the interior to water damage. In 2016, a brick addition to the north side of the building was removed to assist with redevelopment.

== See also ==
- National Register of Historic Places listings in Center Township, Marion County, Indiana
