= Mapleton-Fall Creek, Indianapolis =

Neighborhood in Indianapolis, Indiana, US

Coordinates: 39°49′N 86°09′W

Mapleton-Fall Creek (MFC) is a historic neighborhood in Indianapolis, Indiana, United States. It is bounded by Fall Creek Parkway South Drive on the east and south, Meridian Street on the west, and 38th Street on the north. The population was 3,460 as of the 2000 Census.

== History ==
The northern section of the neighborhood along Maple Road (now called 38th Street) at North Meridian Street was first settled in 1843 and called Sugar Grove. The community received a post office in the 1850s, which caused it to be renamed Mapleton. By the 1870s a Mapleton stop had been added to the streetcar system, and by the 1880s the community had a population of about 300. The city of Indianapolis annexed Mapleton in 1902.

In the early 1900s, Fall Creek Parkway was designed by the landscape architect George Kessler as part of the Indianapolis Park and Boulevard System. The construction of the parkway helped to attract wealthy residents who lived south of the creek to the neighborhood, with single-family homes in Arts and Crafts, Colonial Revival, and Tudor Revival styles being built. In 1915, the first Indiana Governor's Residence was established on 27th Street overlooking Fall Creek. Duplexes and apartment buildings were also constructed. The Marott Hotel (now converted to apartments) was opened in 1926. By the 1930s there were 27 luxury apartment buildings between 30th and 38th streets.

The neighborhood began to decline in the 1940s and 1950s as residents began moving to newer neighborhoods north of 38th Street. As new residents moved in, the racial composition also changed. In 1960, only 2 percent of the inhabitants were Black, but by 1983, 87 percent of the 12,000 residents were Black. The Mapleton-Fall Creek Neighborhood Association was formed in 1962 to help residents and improve neighborhood conditions. The Mapleton-Fall Creek Development Corporation has led efforts to redevelop the area. Compared with other Indianapolis neighborhoods, Mapleton Fall-Creek has retained much of its original infrastructure and housing stock.

=== Today ===
The neighborhood is characterized by mature trees, curving boulevards, and a collection of early-20th-century residences reflecting Tudor Revival, Colonial Revival, and Arts and Crafts design traditions. It encompasses four national historic districts: the Central Court Historic District, Historic Meridian Park, Shortridge–Meridian Street Apartments Historic District, and Watson Park Historic District.

Residents have access to several thoroughfares (Fall Creek Parkway, Meridian Street, and Central Avenue), as well as IndyGo bus routes, the Monon Trail, and the Fall Creek Trail. Most recently, the process of gentrification has begun to attract professionals who take advantage of the neighborhood's character, housing stock, and proximity to the city center.

Mapleton-Fall Creek is adjacent to the Butler-Tarkington, Meridian-Kessler, Fall Creek Place, and Crown Hill neighborhoods.

== See also ==
- List of neighborhoods in Indianapolis
