= Oriental Lodge No. 500 =

- U.S. National Register of Historic Places
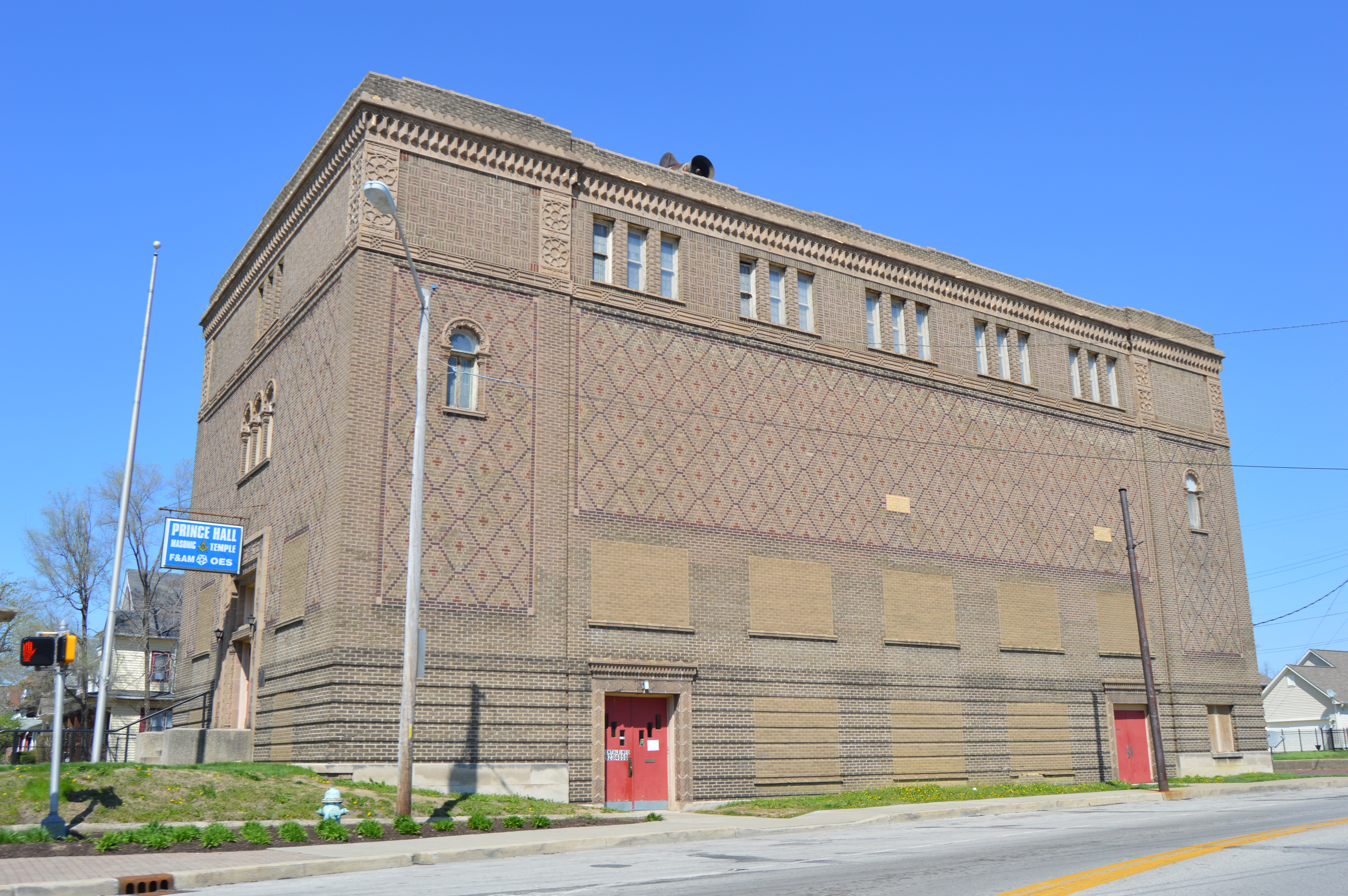
- Oriental Lodge No. 500, April 2016

- Location within Indianapolis Location within Indiana Location within the United States
- Location: 2201 Central, Indianapolis, Indiana
- Coordinates: 39°47′52″N 86°08′57″W
- Area: Less than 1 acre (0.40 ha)
- Built: 1916
- Architect: Herbert L. Bass and Company; Foltz, Herbert; Rubush & Hunter
- Architectural style: Exotic Revival
- NRHP reference No.: 16000079
- Added to NRHP: March 15, 2016

Oriental Lodge No. 500, known today as Prince Hall Masonic Temple, is a historic building located in Indianapolis, Indiana, United States. It was designed by Rubush & Hunter and others and completed in 1916. It is a four-story, rectangular, steel frame and reinforced concrete structure with brick exterior walls. It has terra cotta decorative elements that are interpretations of Islamic architecture of the Middle East, North Africa, and Spain.

It was listed on the National Register of Historic Places in 2016.

== See also ==
- National Register of Historic Places listings in Center Township, Marion County, Indiana
