= YWCA Blue Triangle Residence Hall =

- U.S. National Register of Historic Places
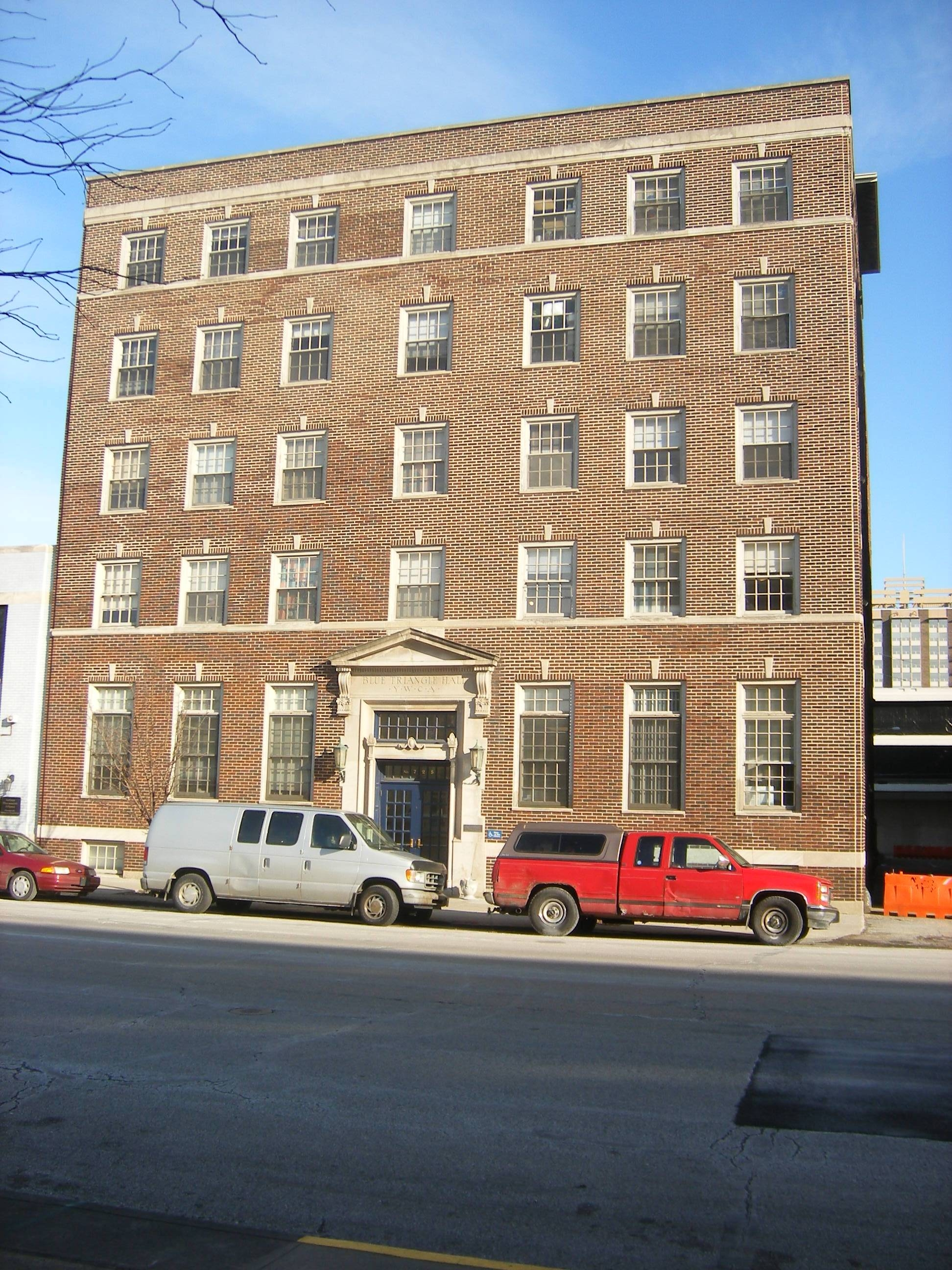
- YWCA Blue Triangle Residence Hall, January 2010

- Location within Indianapolis Location within Indiana Location within the United States
- Location: 725 N. Pennsylvania St., Indianapolis, Indiana
- Coordinates: 39°46′39″N 86°9′19″W
- Area: less than one acre
- Built: 1924
- Built by: Jungclaus, William & Co.
- Architect: Rubush, Preston C. & Hunter, Edgar O.
- Architectural style: Classical Revival
- NRHP reference No.: 88001574
- Added to NRHP: September 27, 1988

YWCA Blue Triangle Residence Hall is a historic YWCA residence hall located at Indianapolis, Indiana. It was designed by the architecture firm Rubush & Hunter and built in 1924. It is a five-story, "L"-plan, Classical Revival style steel frame building clad in red brick. It has a raised brick faced foundation and central entrance with a carved limestone surround.

It was listed on the National Register of Historic Places in 1988.

== See also ==
- National Register of Historic Places listings in Center Township, Marion County, Indiana
