= Leslie Ayres =

American architect (1906–1952)

Leslie F. Ayres
- Born: 1906; Indianapolis, Indiana
- Died: September 6, 1952 (aged 45–46); Indianapolis, Indiana
- Occupations: Architect and Renderer
- Known for: Well-known Indianapolis architect and artist

Leslie F. Ayres (1906–1952) was an American architect active in Indianapolis, Indiana from 1926 to 1945. Leslie F. Ayres was a well known architect and artist in Indianapolis, Indiana. He was known within the architectural circles for his highly refined and exquisite renderings. Ayres began his career early with the firm of Pierre and Wright. During his time with the firm he was awarded the Princeton Prize in Architecture in 1926, which allowed him to attend Princeton University, and eventually earn his certificate of proficiency in 1927. Upon his graduation from Princeton, he moved back to Indianapolis, and started his own firm. His renderings often done in watercolor and colored pencil were often used to sell the client on a project, and in 1948 National Architect stated he was “just about the only professional renderer in Indiana.

== Personal life ==
Ayres was born in 1906 in Indianapolis, Indiana to Frank and Bertha Wolf Ayres. The Ayres also had a younger son named Robert. The two brothers both attended Arsenal Technical High School where Leslie learned to draw and developed a passion for architecture.

In 1937, Ayres married Edna C. Silcox. The two were together until he died of a heart attack in 1952 at the age of 46. They had no children. He is buried in Indianapolis, in the Washington Park East Cemetery

== Practice ==
Leslie F. Ayres was recruited out of high school, by a young Indianapolis architect by the name of Edward Pierre. Pierre recognized his talent for rendering, and in 1925 he quickly gave Ayres a job in his newly formed company, Pierre & Wright. He would later become Ayres’ mentor, and Ayres stayed with the company until 1926, when he received the prestigious Princeton Prize in architecture. The award allowed him to attend Princeton University for one year for free tuition. During his time at Princeton, professors lauded him for his natural drawing ability, but his performance was somewhat lackluster, and professors often complained about his lack of focus on assignments. Despite his difficulties during his year there, Ayres earned his Certificate of Proficiency in 1927, and returned to Indianapolis.

Upon his return to Indianapolis, Leslie Ayres began working as an architect and renderer in the area. He received work from his former employers, Pierre & Wright, as well as other prominent Indianapolis architectural firms such as Rubush & Hunter, A. M. Strauss, and Robert Frost Daggett. His renderings were very popular, often made in watercolor and colored pencil; they were used by architects to lend an air of sophistication to their projects, and were used to sell the client on the project. His early drawings depict a wide variety of subjects including: power plants, high schools, monuments, clubs, civic structures, and religious buildings. His professional drawings in the 1930s and 1940s depicted residences, apartment buildings, and churches. During a visit to the Chicago World's Fair in 1933, Ayres sketched scenes from Belgian Village. In 1948, National Architect magazine described him as “just about the only professional renderer in Indiana.” His most celebrated work was the design for the Wilkinson House in Muncie, Indiana, which he did in the early 1930s. An Art Moderne masterpiece, the house was, and still is, celebrated as one of the best examples of this style of residential architecture in Indiana. Ayres was also an active leader in the Indianapolis Home Show between 1940 and 1947. He designed many of the model homes used in the show during this time. His focus was on small sophisticated homes that did not trade style for square footage.

== Works ==
- Depew Memorial Fountain, University Park, Indianapolis, IN,
- En-Ar-Co and White Rose Service Stations, c. 1930s
- Columbia Club Sketch, Monument Circle, Indianapolis, IN, c.1930s
- Polar Ice and Fuel Company, Indianapolis, IN, 1927
- Wilkinson House, 3100 West University Avenue, Muncie, IN, c. 1933
