= Harry C. Stutz =

American automotive industry pioneer (1876–1930)

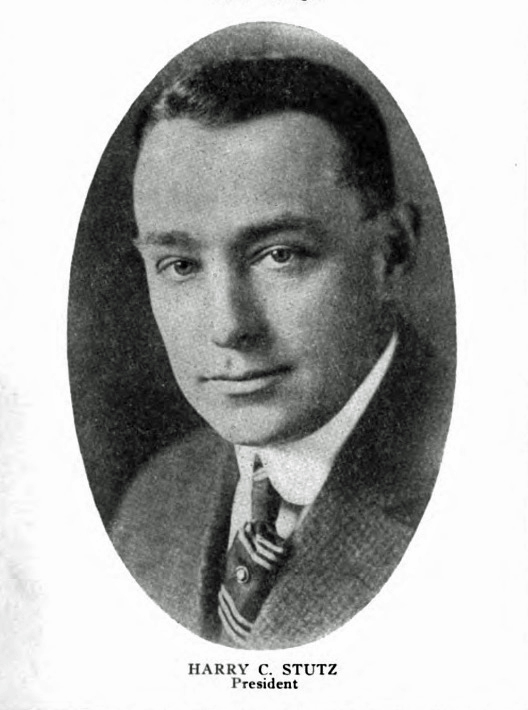
- Harry C. Stutz, c. 1920
- Born: September 12, 1876; Darke County, Ohio, U.S.
- Died: June 26, 1930 (aged 53); Indianapolis, Indiana, U.S.
- Resting place: Crown Hill Cemetery and Arboretum, Section 47,Niche Lot 334; Indianapolis, Indiana, U.S.
- Occupations: Automotive entrepreneur; businessman
- Known for: Stutz Motor Car Company; H. C. S. Motor Car Company
- Spouses: Clara Marie Dietz (m. 1897; div. 1925) Blanche Clark Miller (m. 1926)
- Children: 1 (Emma, 1901-1992)

Harry Clayton Stutz (September 12, 1876 – June 26, 1930) was an American automobile manufacturer, entrepreneur, self-taught engineer, and innovator in the automobile industry. Stutz was part of the burgeoning Indianapolis automotive industry of the early 20th century, where he founded the Ideal Motor Car Company, later known as the Stutz Motor Car Company, and the short-lived H. C. S. Motor Car Company.

== Early life ==
Harry Stutz was born On September 12, 1876, near Ansonia, Ohio, to farmer Henry J. Stutz and his wife Elizabeth (née Schneider). Upon finishing his schooling, Stutz moved to Dayton, Ohio. He worked for the Davis Sewing Machine Company and National Cash Register before he opened a machine shop and repair business in 1897.

Stutz grew up caring for and repairing agricultural machinery on the family farm and was fascinated by automobiles. Stutz built his first car in 1897, and in 1900 he built a second automobile using a gasoline engine of his own design and manufacture. In 1899, Stutz established the Stutz Manufacturing Company in Dayton to produce engines. In 1902, the Lindsay Automobile Parts Company of Indianapolis sought to use his engines at their Indianapolis manufacturing facility. The two companies merged that year, bringing Stutz to Indianapolis.

== Move to Indianapolis ==
Upon arrival in Indianapolis, Stutz continued to work within the newly founded automotive industry. With two other investors he established Central Motor Car Company but moved on to the Schebler Carburetor Company at the end of 1904 to sell their carburetors.

In 1905, Stutz designed a car for the American Motor Car Company. In 1907, Stutz became the chief engineer and factory manager at the Marion Motor Car Company. At Marion, he became one of the company's racing drivers competing in local Indianapolis races.

Stutz formed the Stutz Auto Parts Company in 1910 to manufacture his newly patented transaxle design. Stutz came to the attention of the founders of the Indianapolis Motor Speedway, who had formed the Empire Motor Car Company in 1909. Stutz was brought on as the designer of the group's first automobile, the Empire.

== Stutz Motor Car Company ==
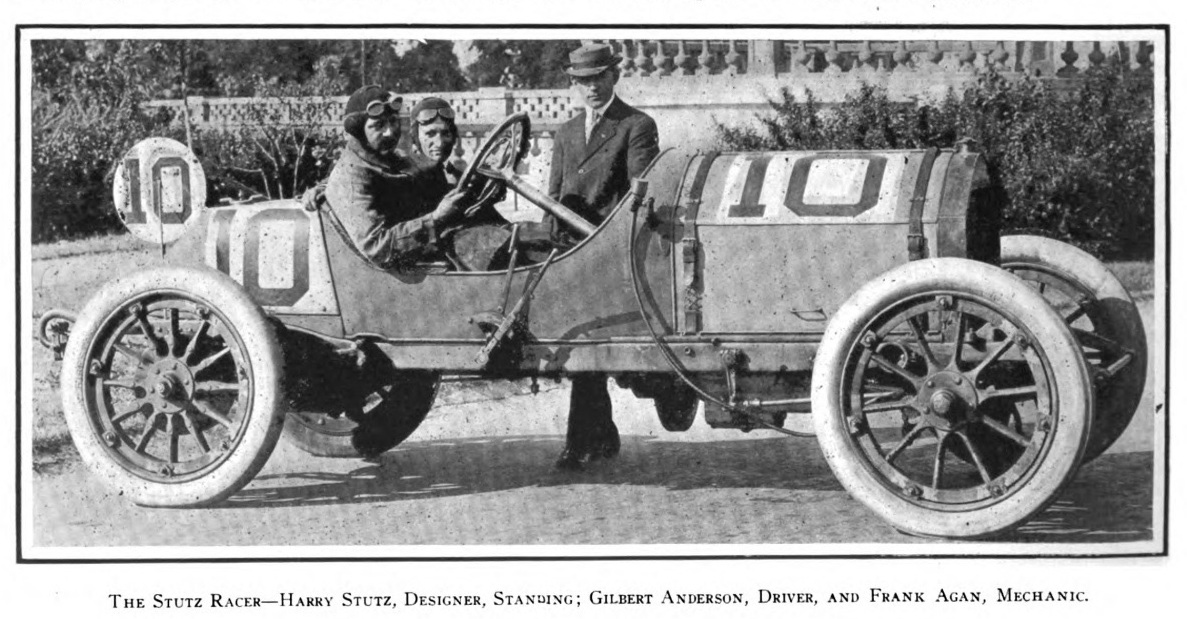
Stutz (standing), with his Bear Cat automobile at the 1911 Indianapolis 500

Building upon his success with the Empire, Stutz sought to enter a car in the upcoming Indianapolis 500-mile race. In a five-week period, Stutz designed and built his own car and entered it in the race. This car was named the Bear Cat, a prototype of what later became the Stutz Bearcat. Stutz's car was driven by Gil Andersen with mechanic Frank Agan and placed 11th in the inaugural Indianapolis 500-mile Race. The Bear Cat suffered no mechanical defects, with Andersen and Agan only stopping for tires and fuel. Stutz immediately set about putting his Bear Cat into production, with the slogan "the car that made good in a day."

Stutz, with financial backing from Henry F. Campbell, founded the Ideal Motor Car Company in June 1911 to begin production of their new automobile. The Ideal Motor Car Company opened a factory on the northwest side of downtown Indianapolis. In 1913, Stutz merged Ideal with the Stutz Auto Parts Company to create the Stutz Motor Car Company.

In the first four years of production Stutz sold over 3,000 vehicles and expanded its operations. By 1920, the manufacturing factory encompassed an entire city block.To find more capital for his prospering business, Stutz fell in with a New York stockbroker, Allan A. Ryan. In 1916, Stutz Motor Car Company of America was listed on the New York Stock Exchange. Ryan now controlled the business, with Stutz staying on as president. Uncomfortable with Ryan's business style, Harry Stutz resigned from the Stutz Motor Car Company in 1919. Ryan lost his controlling interest and was forced to sell the company to an investment group that included Charles M. Schwab. The company remained solvent throughout the 1920s, but various lawsuits and contract disputes, coupled with the weakened automobile market from the Great Depression, caused the company to fold by the end of the 1930s.

== H. C. S. Motor Car Company ==
Shortly after leaving the Stutz Motor Car Company, Harry Stutz re-entered the automotive industry by founding the H. C. S. Motor Car Company. Stutz reenlisted the help of Henry Campbell, and was able to raise $1,000,000 in capital by late 1919. H. C. S. focused on sportscars and roadsters, and by 1920 had vehicles available for dealers. The first H. C. S. vehicle, named the H. C. S. Special, was advertised beginning in February 1920, with Stutz's cousin, Charles E. Stutz, listed as the sole Indiana distributor.

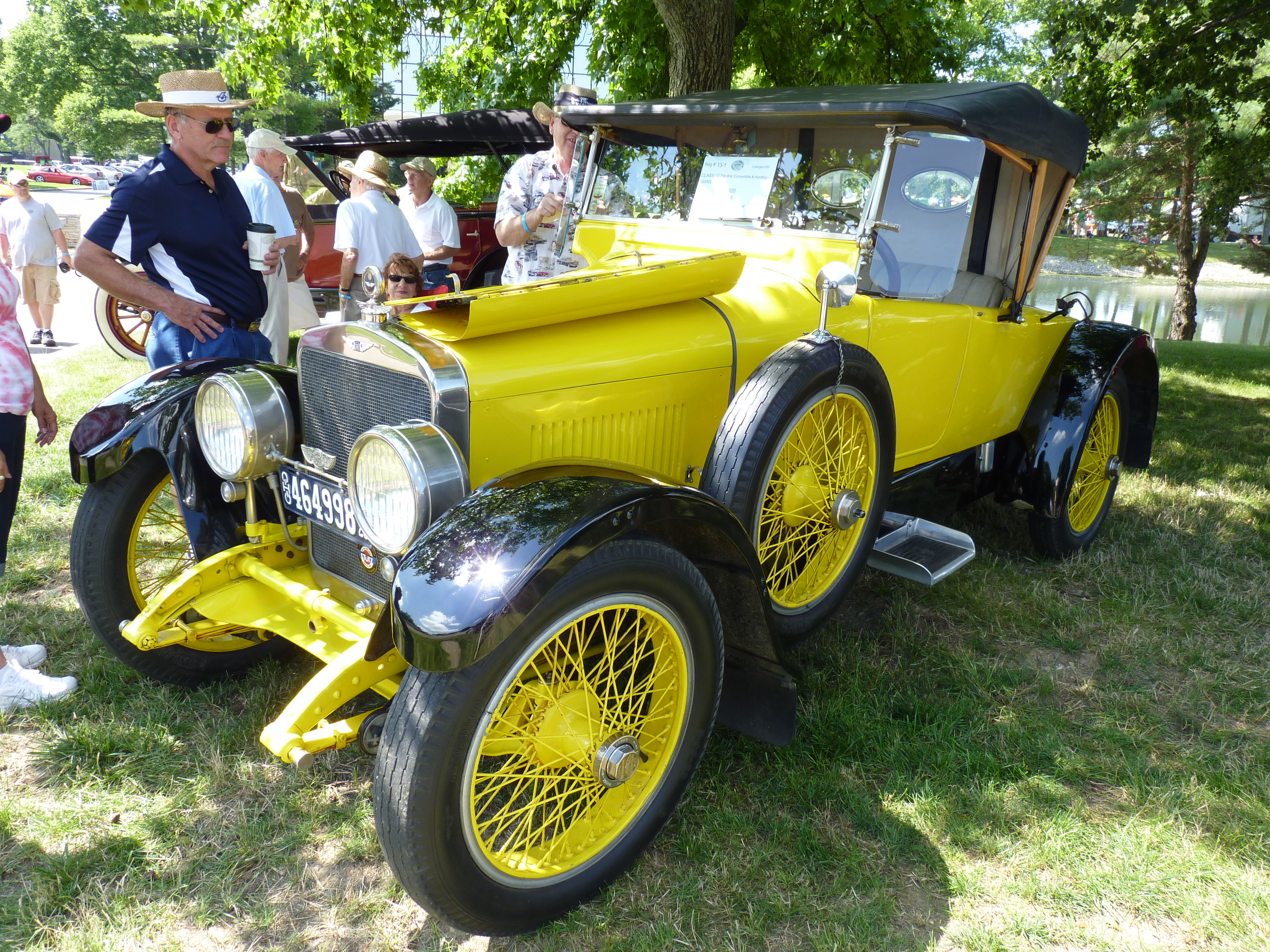
1920 H.C.S. Series 2 Roadster, shown in 2013

In 1924, Stutz expanded the H. C. S. business, introducing the new H. C. S. taxicab. Stutz sought to corner the market on wholesale buying of taxis as their demand grew in the 1920s. The H. C. S. Motor Car Company was purchased by the newly-formed H. C. S. Cab Manufacturing Company. Stutz and Campbell continued to run the operation from their North Capitol Avenue manufacturing plant, manufacturing both taxicabs and automobiles. The H. C. S. taxicabs were met with positive reception and Stutz showcased the newly designed vehicles in New York City.

In 1926, Stutz closed H. C. S. Motor Car Company and moved to Florida.

== Other automotive ventures ==
Stutz began manufacturing fire engines with the Stutz Fire Engine Company in 1920. The Stutz Fire Engine Company ran concurrently with the H. C. S. Motor Car Company, occupying two buildings in the same complex on North Capitol Avenue in Indianapolis. Stutz sold the fire engines to several fire departments in Indiana and the coasts as municipal firefighting services began to switch to motorized vehicles in the 1920s. Stutz sold his interest in the fire engine company in 1926. In 1937, the company produced America's first diesel-powered fire truck.

In 1929, Stutz designed a four-cylinder engine for the Stutz-Bellanca Airplane Company.

== Personal life ==
In 1898, Stutz married Clara Marie Dietz (1880–1956). Clara and Harry had one daughter, Emma (1901–1992). Harry and Clara followed Indiana automotive pioneer Carl G. Fisher by moving to Florida, where they settled in Miami. They maintained a residence in Indianapolis, a sprawling 10-bedroom mansion at 3172 North Meridian Street (now 3190 North Meridian Street). Harry and Clara divorced in 1925.

Stutz remarried to Blanche Clark Miller in 1926, and they subsequently moved to Orlando, Florida. Their marriage was the subject of national news, as Blanche's former husband sued Stutz for "alienation of affection," seeking $50,000 in damages.

Stutz was an active member of Indianapolis society. He belonged to the Indianapolis Athletic Club, and was elected its vice-president in 1920 and again in 1925.

== Death and legacy ==
Stutz suffered an inflamed appendix during a June 1930 car trip from Orlando to Indianapolis. Upon arrival in Indianapolis, Stutz was admitted to Methodist Hospital where he underwent surgery to remove his appendix. The surgery was initially reported as successful, and Stutz was listed in fair condition. Despite the initial report, Stutz died the following day, June 26, 1930. Stutz is buried at Crown Hill Cemetery in Indianapolis.

Stutz was inducted into the Automotive Hall of Fame in 1993.
