= Hollywood Boulevard Historic Business District =

Historic district in Florida, United States

- U.S. National Register of Historic Places
- U.S. Historic district
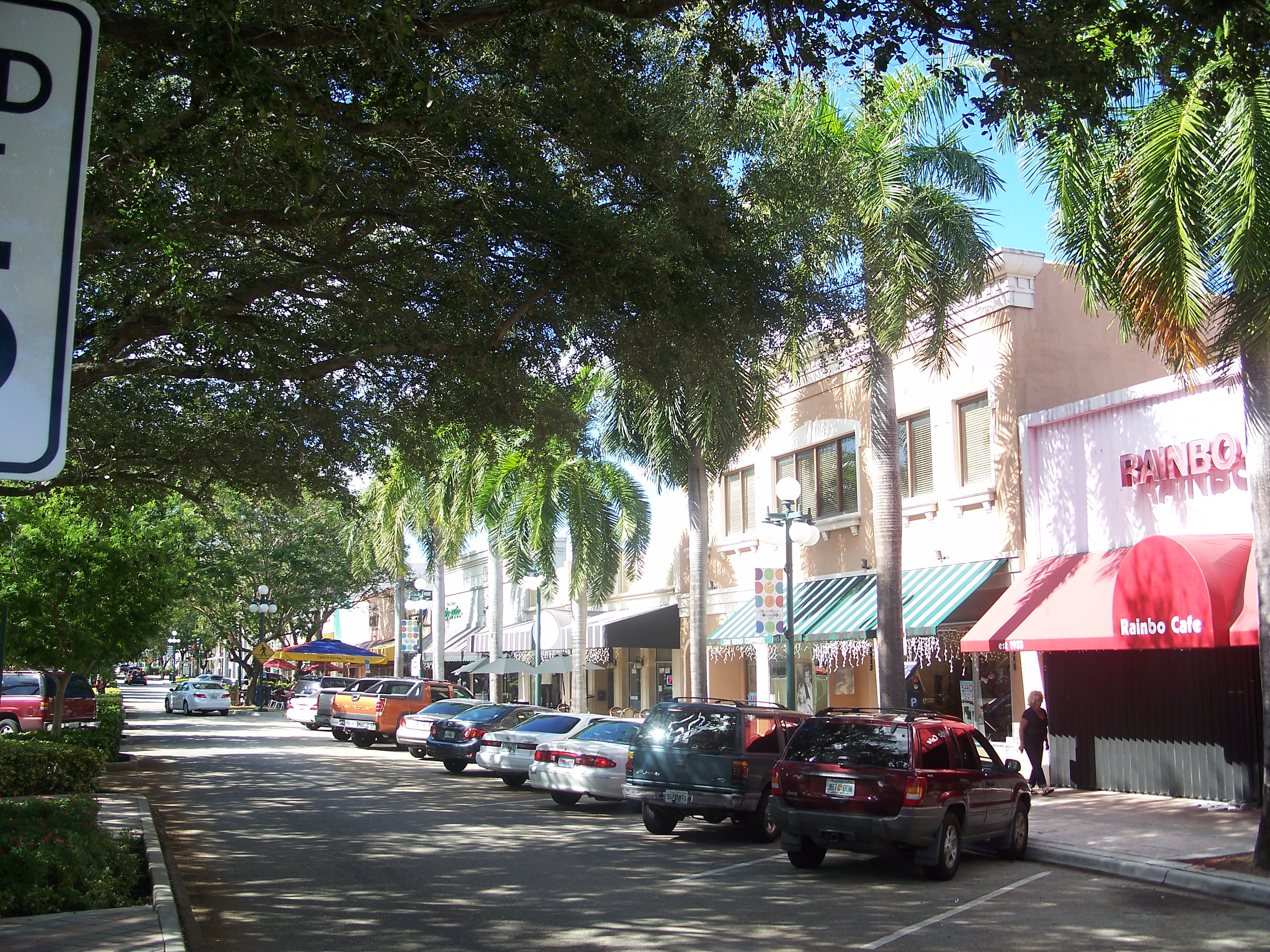

- Location within Florida Location within the United States
- Location: Hollywood, Florida
- Coordinates: 26°00′41.10″N 80°08′49.07″W
- Area: 180 acres (0.73 km^{2})
- NRHP reference No.: 99000231
- Added to NRHP: 18 February 1999

The Hollywood Boulevard Historic Business District is a U.S. historic district (designated as such on February 18, 1999) located in Hollywood, Florida. The district runs along Hollywood Boulevard, between 21st Avenue and Young Circle. It contains 34 historic buildings and two historic sites. The sites are Young Circle Park and Anniversary Park. Planning for the historic district began in 1995 at the approach of the 70th anniversary of the city.

== The Great Southern Hotel ==
The US Department of the Interior identified the Great Southern Hotel as the most notable structure in the area. The hotel was featured in the 1969 film Midnight Cowboy. The building has been vacant since 1991 and has become dilapidated. It has been owned by local developer Chip Abele since 2002 and now with Peter Jago and the entire GCFRC. Proposals for a building that would incorporate and preserve the hotel have been discussed since 2005 as of 2018 a 19-story mixed use development is slated for construction. The planned development includes a Hilton hotel and will be named Young Circle Commons.
