= H. C. S. Motor Car Company =

Car manufacturer

- U.S. National Register of Historic Places
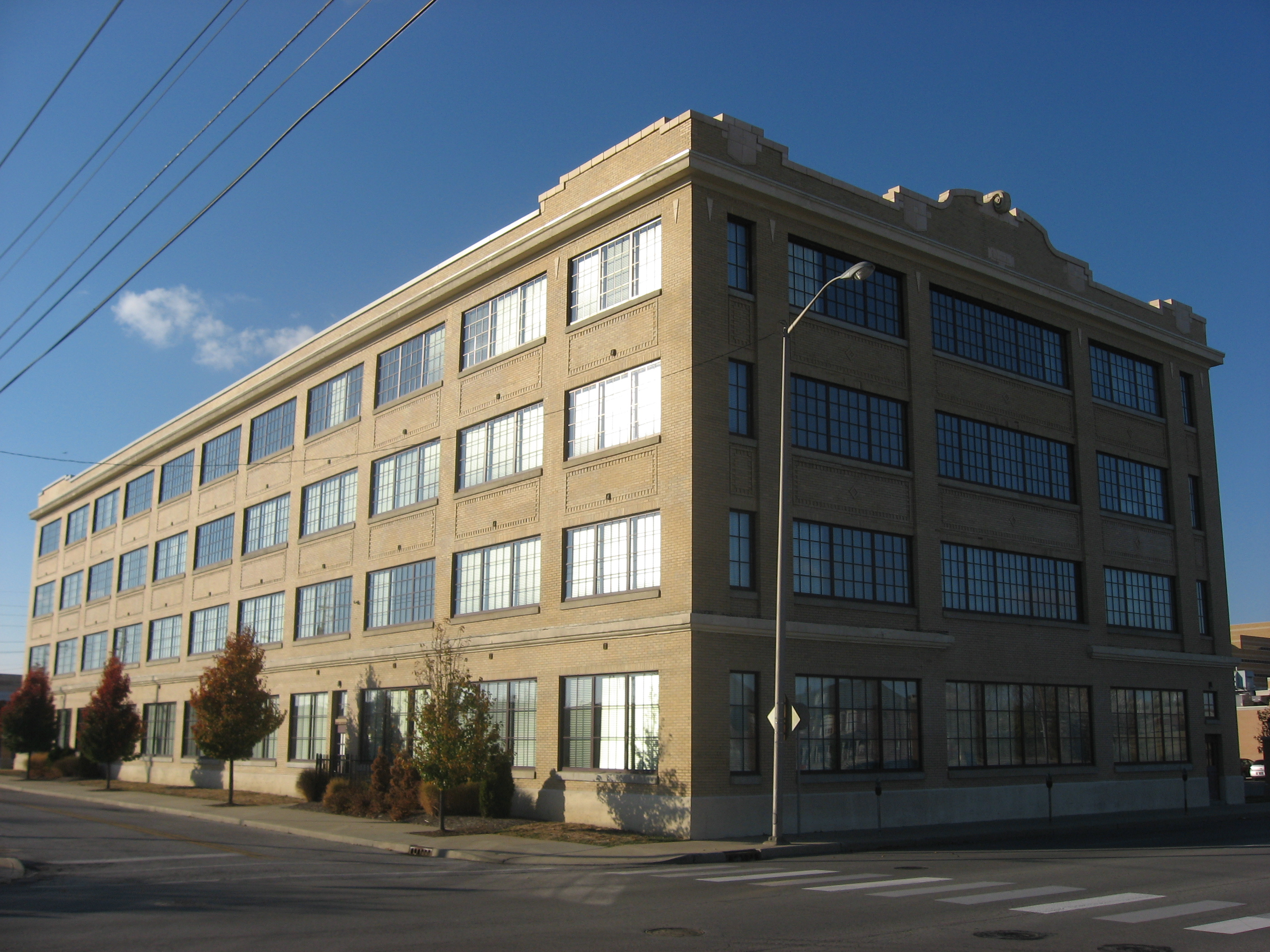
- H.C.S. Motor Car Company Building

- Location within Indianapolis Location within Indiana Location within the United States
- Location: 1402 N. Capitol Avenue, Indianapolis, Indiana
- Coordinates: 39°47′10″N 86°9′42″W
- Area: Less than 1 acre (0.40 ha)
- Built: 1920-1921
- Architect: Rubush & Hunter
- Architectural style: Classical Revival
- NRHP reference No.: 09000432
- Added to NRHP: June 17, 2009

H. C. S. Motor Car Company was an automobile manufacturer in Indianapolis, Indiana, United States. It may have built as many as 3,000 cars between the summer of 1920 and 1926, when its doors were closed by its creditors.

== Incorporation ==
H. C. S. Motor Car Company was incorporated with $1,000,000 in capital in late 1919 by Harry C. Stutz, founder and former president of the Stutz Motor Car Company, with his friend Harry Campbell as treasurer and Samuel T Murdock as vice-president. Stutz served as president and managing director. He also was the majority stockholder and chairman of the board of directors.

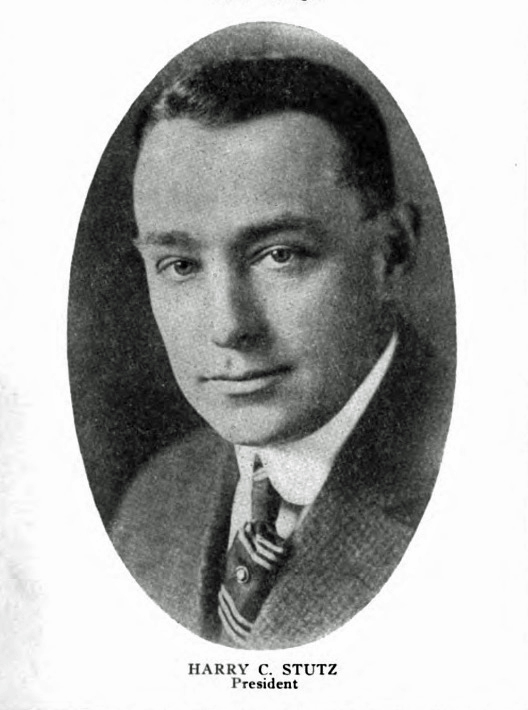
Harry C. Stutz

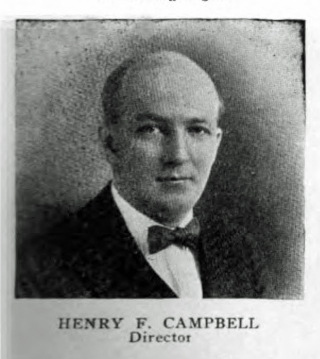
Harry F. Cambell

== Early models ==
A prototype was displayed at the end of 1919. The press noted the hand embossed leather upholstery was on very low seats, the cushions sat directly on the floor. Others reported the center of gravity was very low and the top of the windshield was less than the height of the average man. Demonstrators did not go to dealers until May 1920 because the new factory building was not progressing as it should and production was restricted by difficult conditions in the busy factory of the Stutz Fire Engine Company.

=== Production ===
The first production cars were roadsters and touring cars. A coupe was added in late 1920 and a 4-door sedan was added to the catalogue in July 1921. The body height of the sedan was "low with a European look" but "ample head room" remained.

=== Prices ===
The economic climate of the early 1920s was unstable, with very damaging short sharp booms and busts. Production was cut back from the planned ten cars per day to only five and prices were cut by $200 on all models as of August 1. 1921. Rolls-Royce had announced a $1250 cut in their chassis price two weeks earlier. Further price cuts were announced with effect from March 4, 1922. It was noted they were an approximate reduction of $500 to $600 from the prices at August 1. The new prices were:

$2400	Touring	$3150	Sedan
$2400	Roadster	$2600	All Weather Touring
$2850	Coupe	$2550	All Weather Roadster

== Series 4 ==
A new series 4 model was announced in August 1922 with enlarged cylinder bores giving more horsepower with improved gas consumption. Pistons had been lightened and an automatic spark advance and a new exhaust muffler fitted. There was a larger steering wheel and changes had been made to the springs. A taller radiator and a new design of wire wheels were fitted.

=== H. C. S. Cab Manufacturing Co ===
The struggle continued. Stutz left his Stutz Fire Apparatus Company and took control at H. C. S. In mid-1924, H. C. S. announced its engineers had designed a new taxicab that was lighter than competitors' cars and easier to maintain. A feature of all the H. C. S. cars was the easy accessibility of major components. Design allowed each engine accessory to be serviced without removing or dismantling any other accessories. The press was shown the taxi prototype and photographs were published in December 1924.

== Closure ==
Stutz retreated to Orlando, Florida, in 1925, leaving his car and fire engine businesses to flounder. The next year H. C. S. Motor Car Company was placed in a trust for creditors under the management of Harry's one-time assistant (1920–1925), Charles Merz, an engineer and former race driver.

The company was liquidated in 1927.

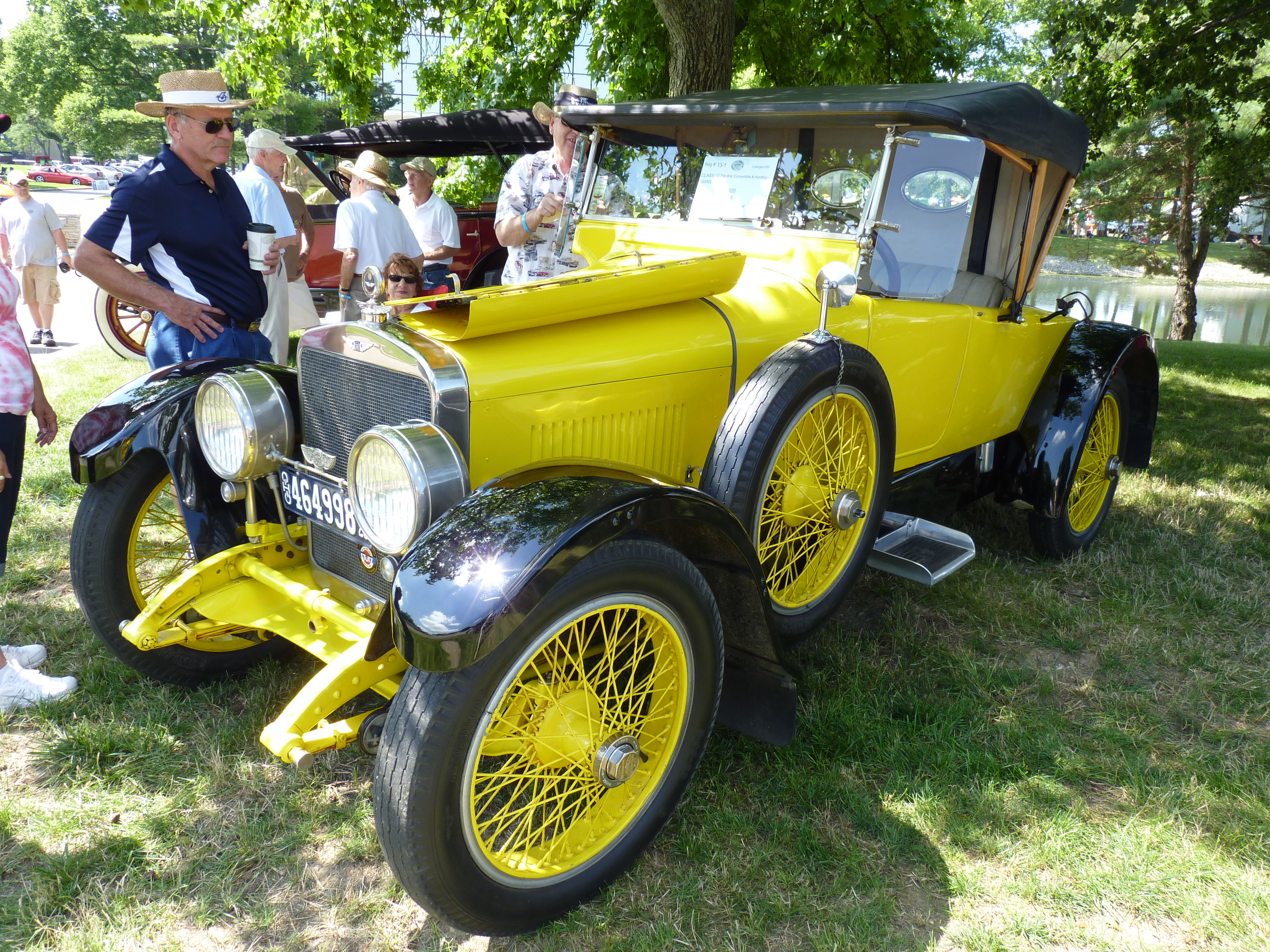
1920 series 2 roadster

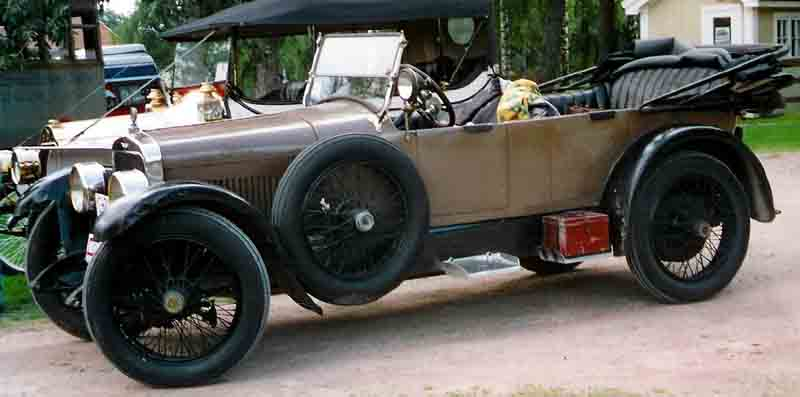
1923 series 4 touring car

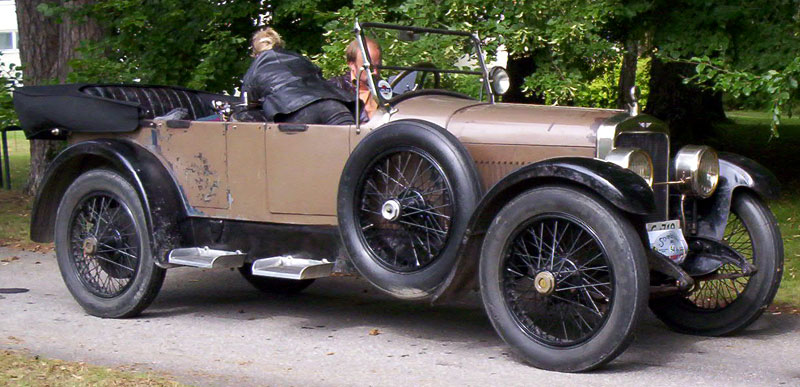
1925 series 4 touring car
