= Historic Meridian Park =

- Meridian Park Historic District
- U.S. National Register of Historic Places
- U.S. Historic district
- Location within Indianapolis Location within Indiana Location within the United States
- Location: Bounded by 34th St., Washington Boulevard, 30th St., and Pennsylvania St., Indianapolis, Indiana
- Coordinates: 39°48′49″N 86°9′12″W
- Area: 42 acres (17 ha)
- Architect: Multiple
- Architectural style: Colonial Revival, Bungalow/Craftsman, Tudor Revival
- NRHP reference No.: 90000326
- Added to NRHP: February 23, 1990

Historic Meridian Park is situated north of downtown Indianapolis and located within the larger Mapleton-Fall Creek neighborhood area. The small, mainly residential section was listed on the National Register of Historic Places in 2009.

The neighborhood began to be developed around the turn of the 20th century. It not only has a significant collection of American Craftsman or Arts & Crafts Style homes, but is also notable as one of Indianapolis's first suburbs.

== See also ==
- National Register of Historic Places listings in Center Township, Marion County, Indiana
