= Jackson Buildings =

- Formerly listed on the U.S. National Register of Historic Places
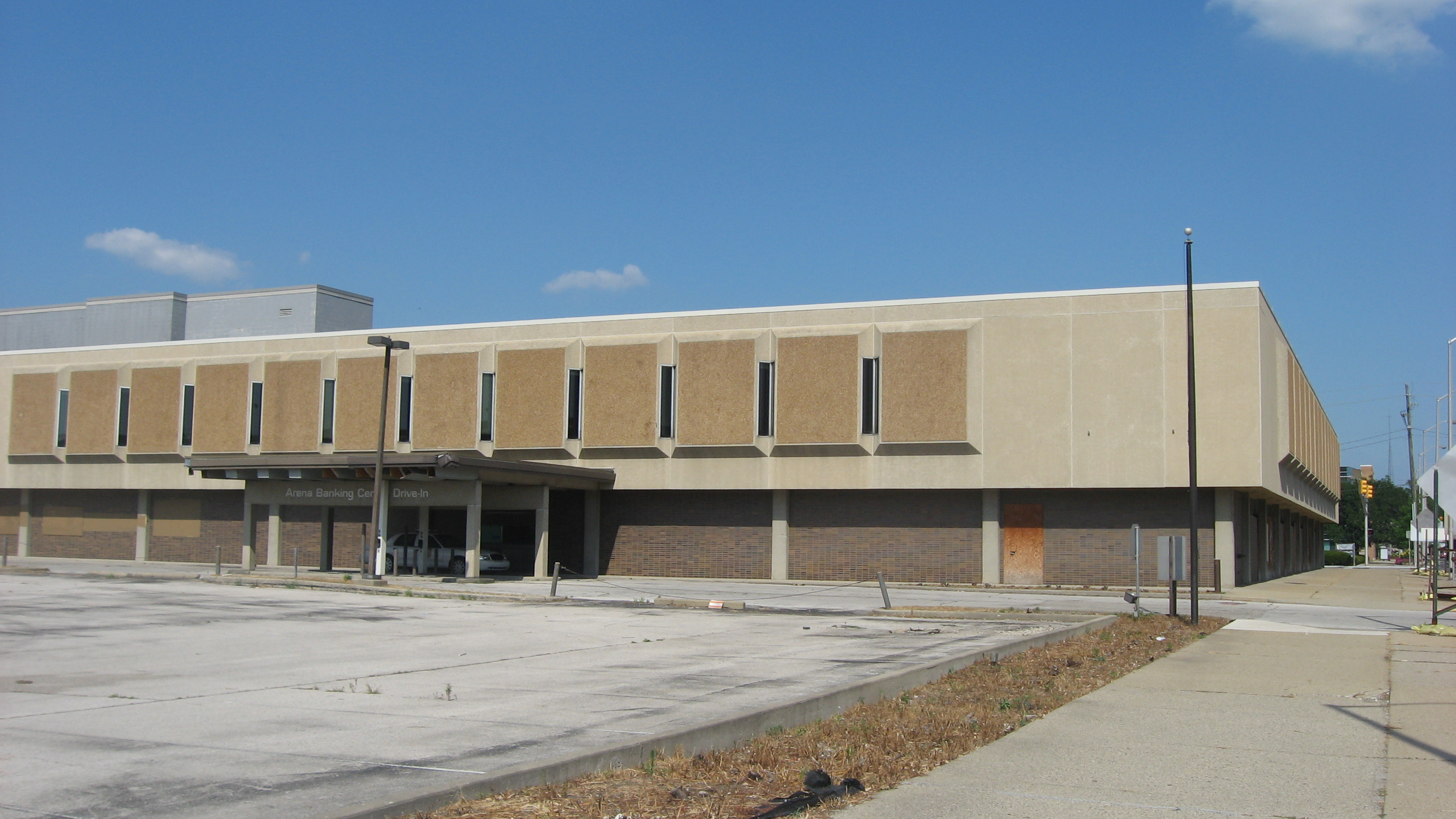
- Bank on the site of the Jackson Buildings, July 2011

- Location within Indianapolis Location within Indianapolis Location within Indiana Location within the United States
- Location: 419 and 425 E. Washington St., Indianapolis, Indiana
- Coordinates: 39°46′02″N 86°8′58″W
- Area: less than one acre
- Built: c. 1882-1883, c. 1923
- Architectural style: Italianate
- NRHP reference No.: 84000496

Significant dates
- Added to NRHP: December 13, 1984
- Removed from NRHP: May 24, 1993

Jackson Buildings, also known as the Standard Grocery/Capital Furnace, were two historic commercial buildings located at Indianapolis, Indiana. One was a four-story brick building built about 1882–83, and the other, a five-story building built about 1923. The older building exhibited Italianate and Beaux-Arts style design elements. The buildings housed a variety of commercial enterprises, including the Standard Grocery Company. The two buildings were demolished and replaced by a bank building.

The buildings were listed on the National Register of Historic Places in 1984 and delisted in 1993.

== See also ==
- National Register of Historic Places listings in Center Township, Marion County, Indiana
