= Gibson Company Building =

- U.S. National Register of Historic Places
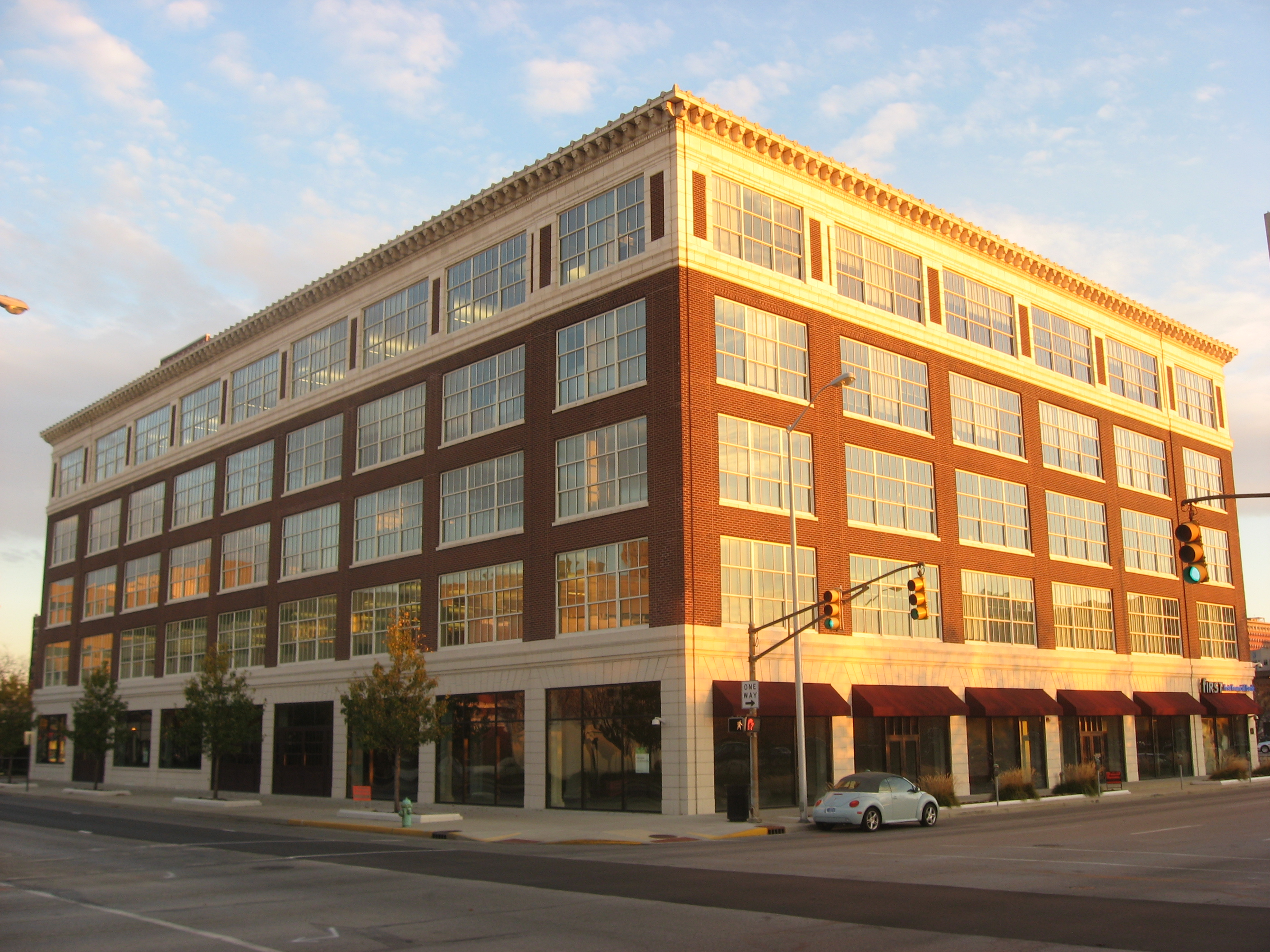
- Gibson Company Building, November 2010

- Location within Indianapolis Location within Indianapolis Location within Indiana Location within the United States
- Location: 433-447 N. Capitol Ave., Indianapolis, Indiana
- Coordinates: 39°46′33″N 86°9′39″W
- Area: less than one acre
- Built: 1916-1917
- Architect: Bass, Herbert L. & Co.
- Architectural style: Chicago, Renaissance
- NRHP reference No.: 09000431
- Added to NRHP: June 17, 2009

Gibson Company Building is a historic industrial / commercial building located at Indianapolis, Indiana. It was built in 1916–1917, and is a five-story, rectangular reinforced concrete building over a basement. It has brick and terra cotta curtain walls. The building features Chicago style windows with Italian Renaissance style detailing. It was originally built to house an automobile assembler, supplier, and showroom.

It was listed on the National Register of Historic Places in 2009.

== See also ==
- National Register of Historic Places listings in Center Township, Marion County, Indiana
