= Louis Levey Mansion =

Historic house in Indiana, United States

- U.S. National Register of Historic Places
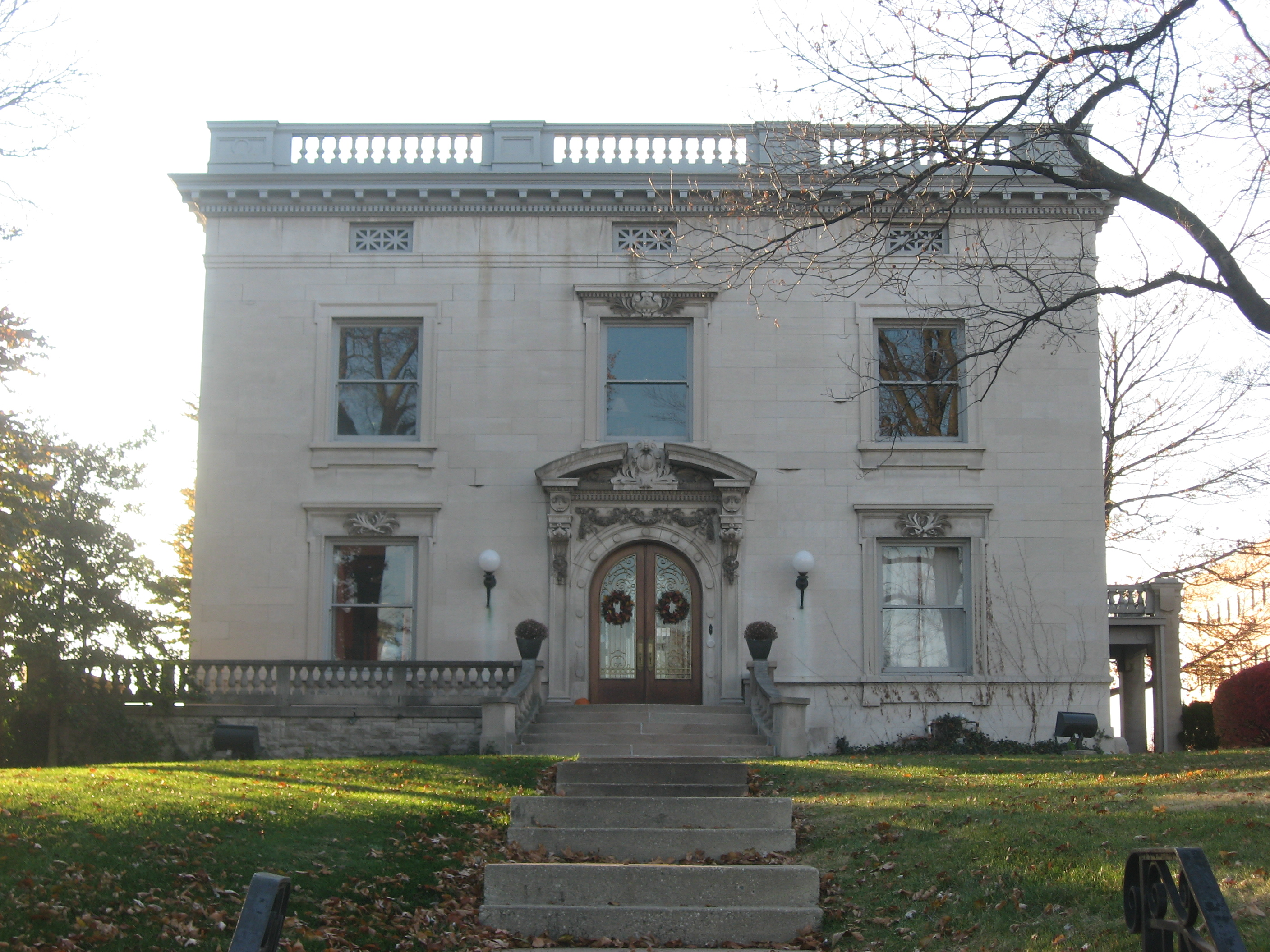
- Louis Levey Mansion, November 2010

- Location within Indianapolis Location within Indiana Location within the United States
- Location: 2902 N. Meridian St., Indianapolis, Indiana
- Coordinates: 39°48′30″N 86°9′24″W
- Area: 1 acre (0.40 ha)
- Built: 1905
- Architectural style: Late 19th And 20th Century Revivals
- NRHP reference No.: 78000047
- Added to NRHP: December 22, 1978

Louis Levey Mansion, also known as the Pilgrim Life Insurance Company Building, is a historic home located at Indianapolis, Indiana. It was built in 1905, and is a two-story, Italian Renaissance style limestone dwelling consisting of a three-bay-by-four-bay main block with a one-bay-by-two-bay rear block. It has a semicircular bay on the rear facade. The front facade features a round arched entrance flanked by pilasters and the roof is ringed by a balustrade. The house was converted for commercial uses in the 1950s.

It was listed on the National Register of Historic Places in 1978.

== See also ==
- National Register of Historic Places listings in Center Township, Marion County, Indiana
