= Byram–Middleton House =

Historic house in Indiana, United States

- U.S. National Register of Historic Places
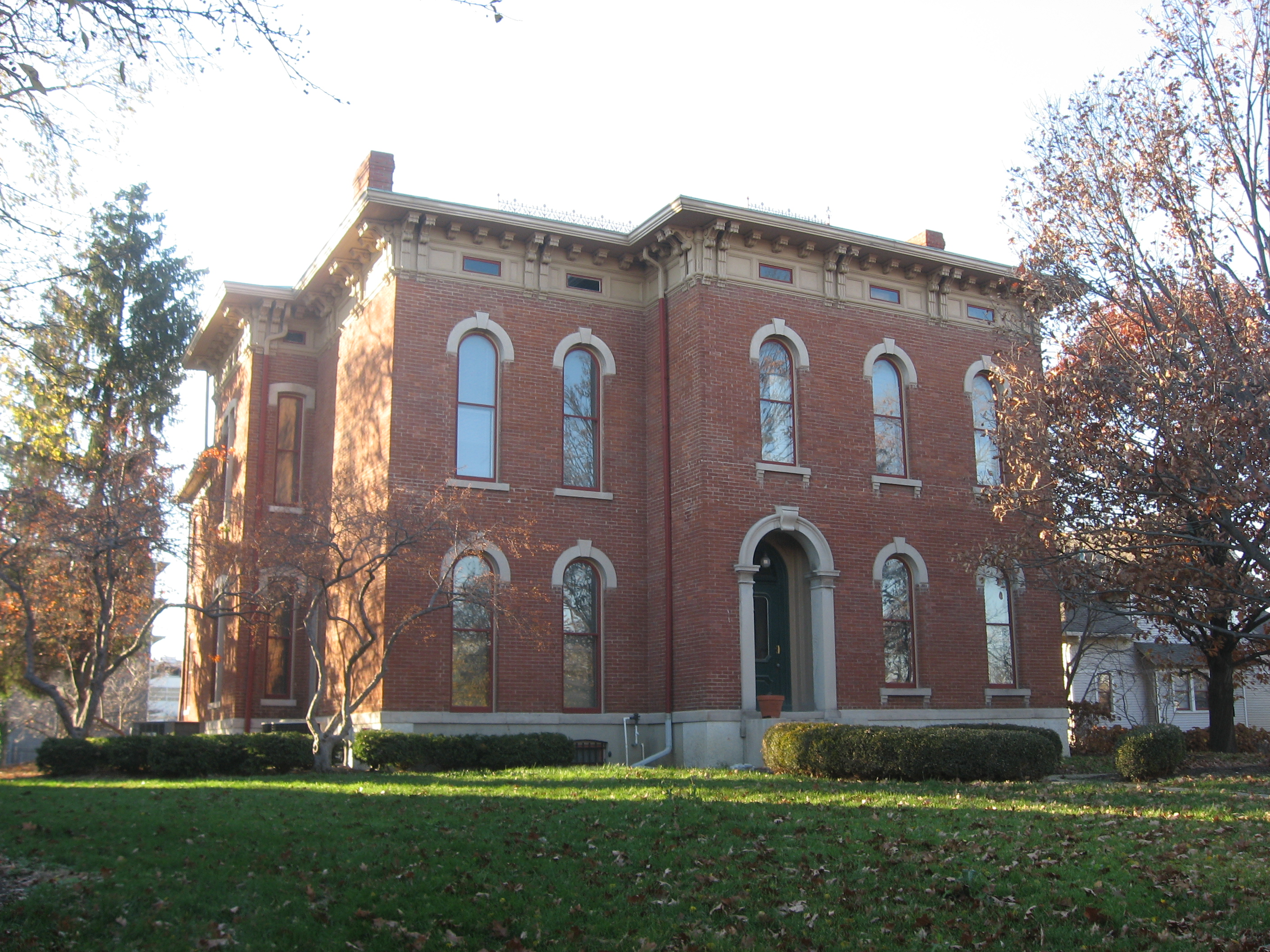
- Byram–Middleton House, November 2010

- Location within Indianapolis Location within Indiana Location within the United States
- Location: 1828 N. Illinois St., Indianapolis, Indiana
- Coordinates: 39°47′29″N 86°9′34″W
- Area: less than one acre
- Built: 1870
- Architectural style: Italianate
- NRHP reference No.: 83000127
- Added to NRHP: May 9, 1983

Byram–Middleton House is a historic home located at Indianapolis, Indiana. It was built in 1870, and is a two-story, irregularly massed, Italianate style brick dwelling. It has a low hipped roof with bracketed eaves and arched openings. It has been converted to commercial uses.

It was listed on the National Register of Historic Places in 1983.

== See also ==
- National Register of Historic Places listings in Center Township, Marion County, Indiana
