= Charles Kuhn House =

Historic house in Indiana, United States

- U.S. National Register of Historic Places
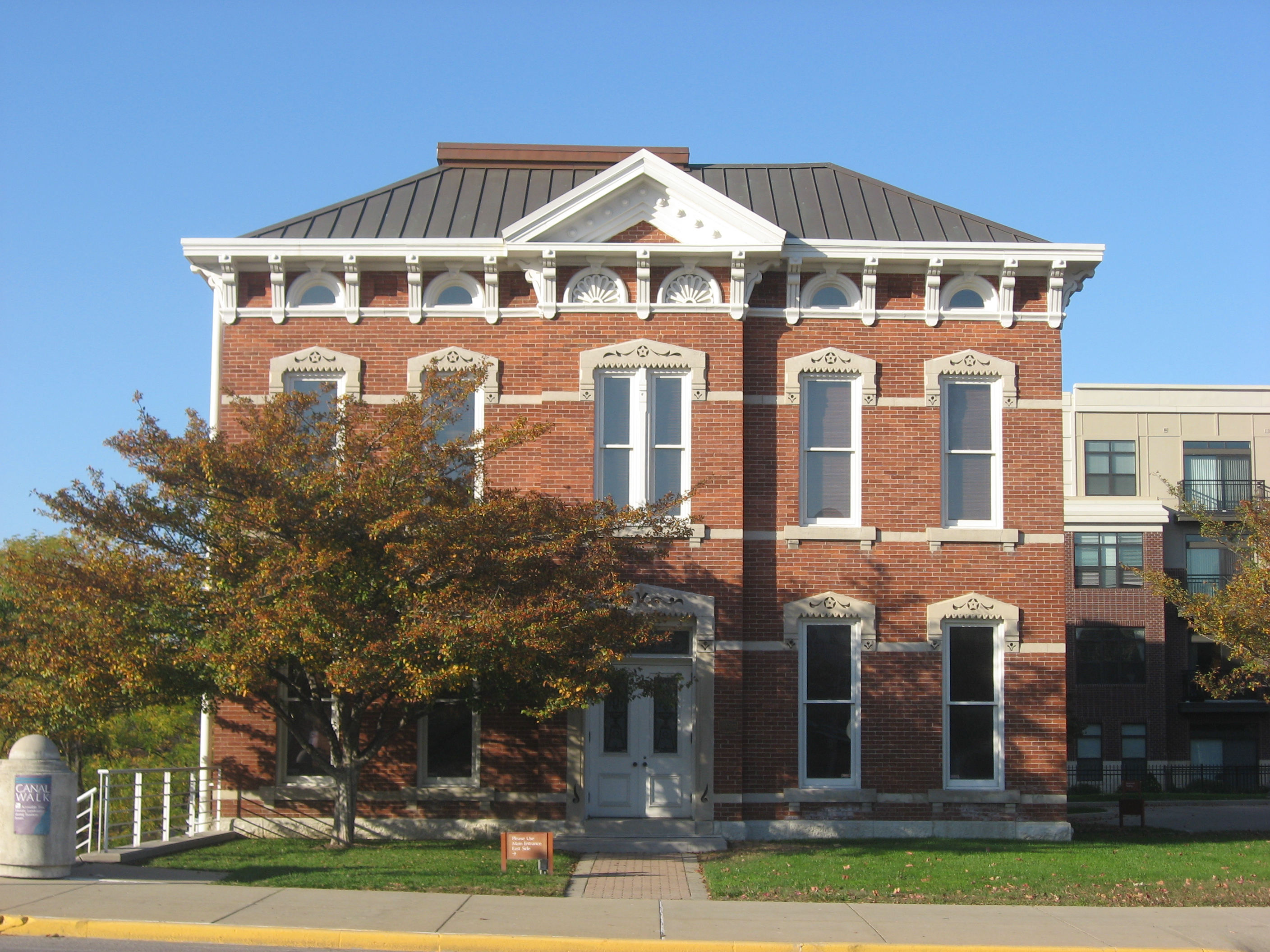
- Charles Kuhn House, October 2010

- Location within Indianapolis Location within Indiana Location within the United States
- Location: 340 W. Michigan St., Indianapolis, Indiana
- Coordinates: 39°46′27″N 86°9′52″W
- Area: less than one acre
- Built: 1879
- Architectural style: Italianate
- NRHP reference No.: 89000237
- Added to NRHP: April 13, 1989

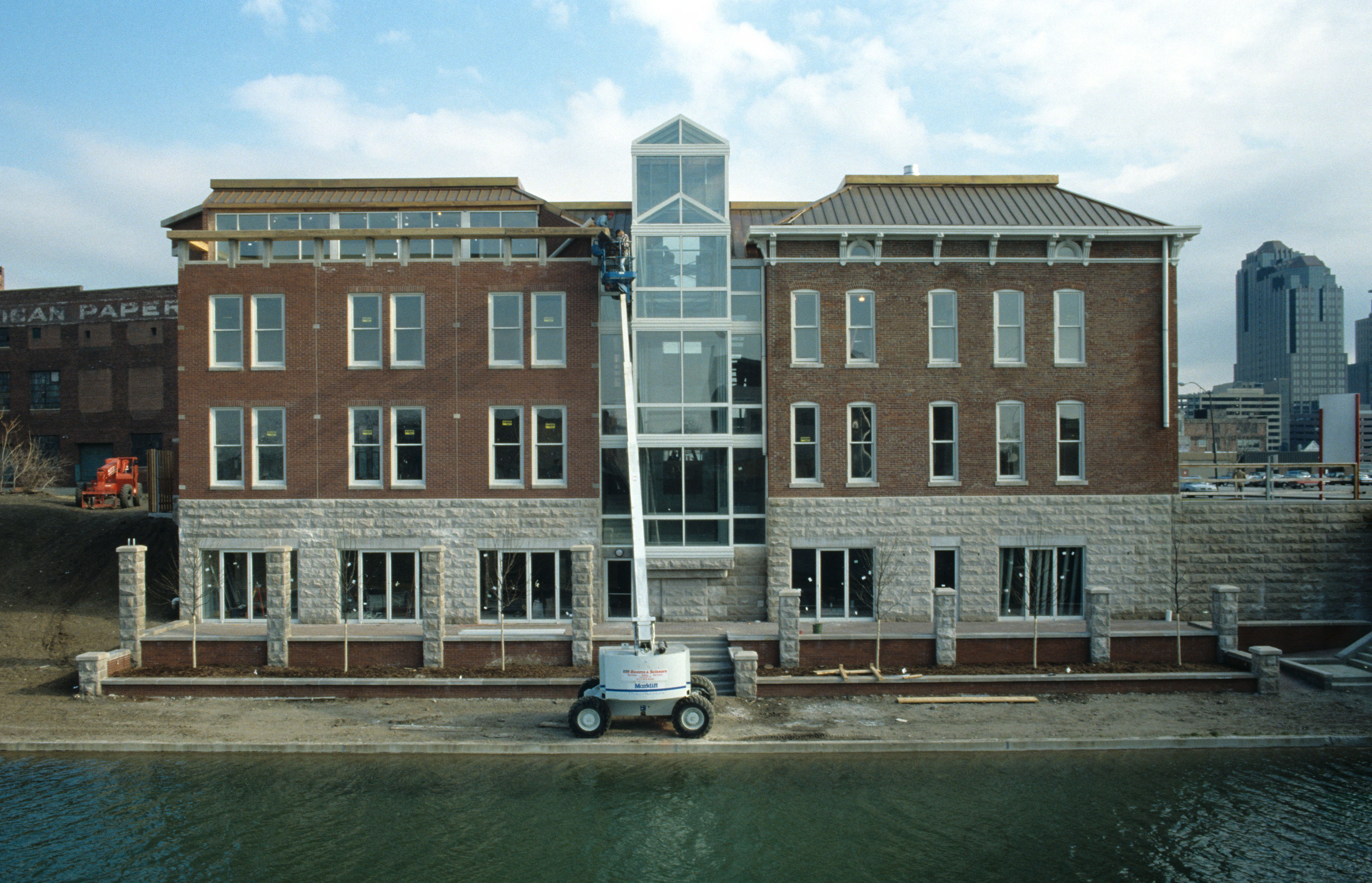
Charles Kuhn House photographed in 1990.

Charles Kuhn House is a historic home located at Indianapolis, Indiana. It was built about 1879, and is a two-story, five-bay, Italianate style brick dwelling. It has a hipped roof with pressed metal brackets and a centered gable.

It was listed on the National Register of Historic Places in 1989.

== See also ==
- National Register of Historic Places listings in Center Township, Marion County, Indiana
