= Alfred M. Glossbrenner Mansion =

Historic house in Indiana, United States

- U.S. National Register of Historic Places
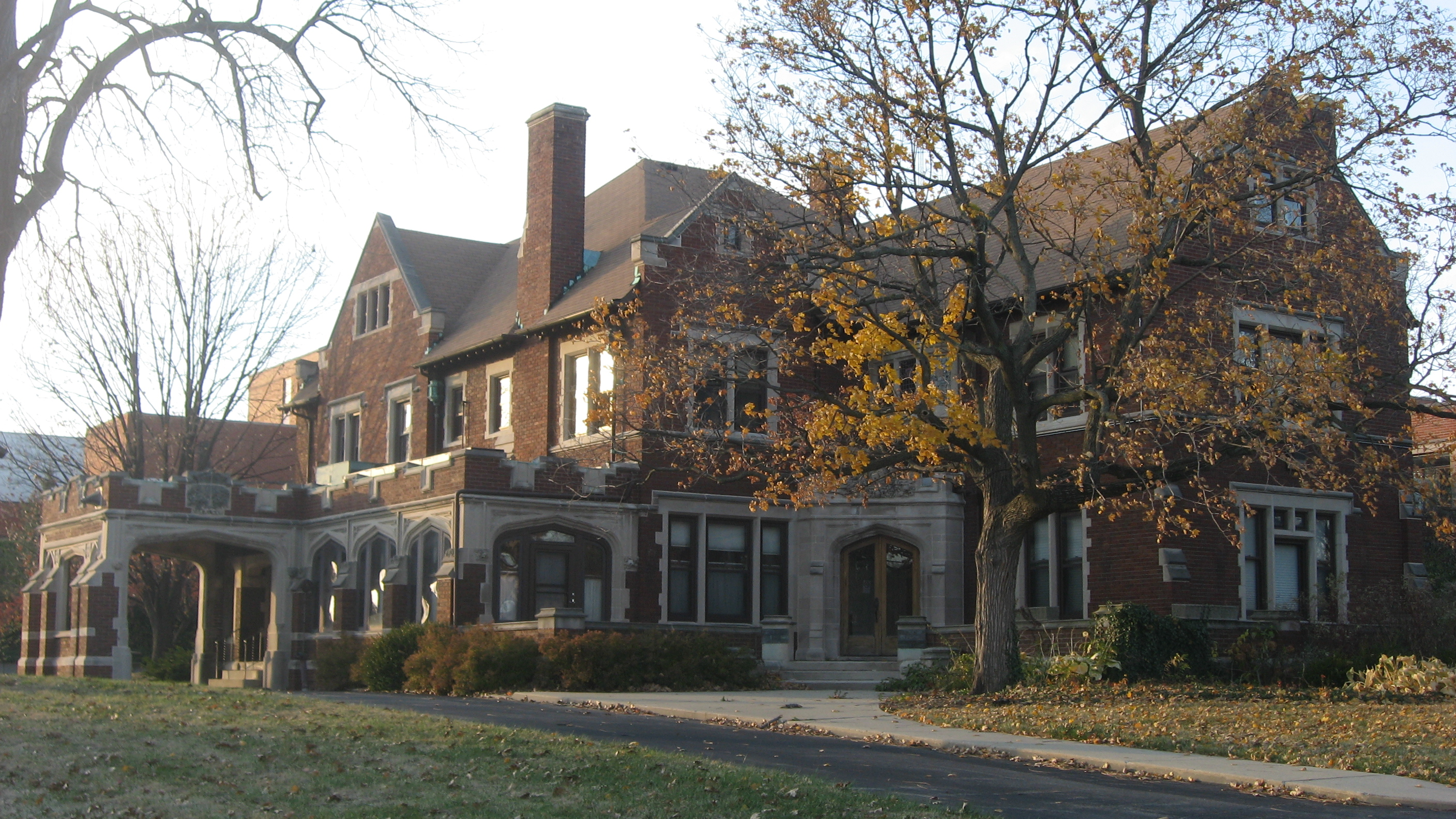
- Alfred M. Glossbrenner Mansion, November 2010

- Location within Indianapolis Location within Indiana Location within the United States
- Location: 3202 N. Meridian St., Indianapolis, Indiana
- Coordinates: 39°48′50″N 86°9′25″W
- Area: 0.8 acres (0.32 ha)
- Built: c. 1910
- Architect: Grindle, Alfred; Schumaker, W. A. Brothers
- Architectural style: Tudor Revival, Jacobethan Revival
- NRHP reference No.: 82000062
- Added to NRHP: February 19, 1982

Alfred M. Glossbrenner Mansion is a historic home located at Indianapolis, Indiana. It was built about 1910, and is a 2 1/2-story, Jacobethan Revival style brick dwelling with limestone trim. It has a porte cochere and sun porch with Tudor arched openings. It features a multi-gabled roof, stone mullions, buttresses, and tall chimneys.

== History ==
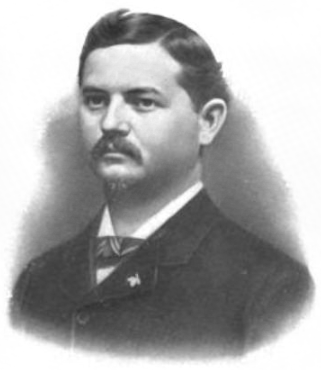
Alfred M. Glossbrenner

The house was built for publisher and politician Alfred Morton Glossbrenner, who owned it until his death in 1938.

It was converted to medical offices for Dr. Joseph Walther in the 1950s.

It was listed on the National Register of Historic Places in 1982.

== See also ==
- National Register of Historic Places listings in Center Township, Marion County, Indiana
