= Prosser House =

Historic house in Indiana, United States

- U.S. National Register of Historic Places
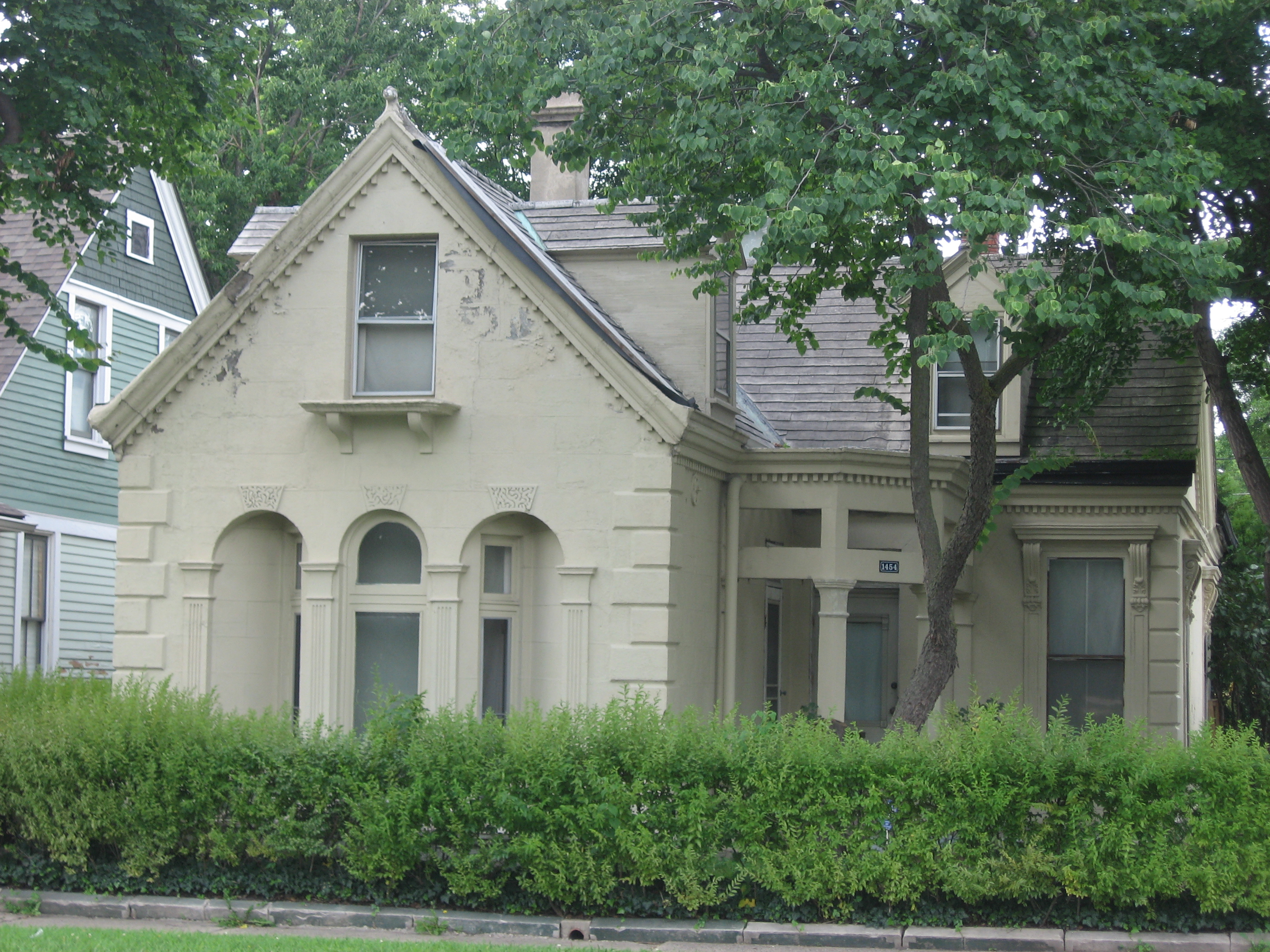
- Prosser House, July 2011

- Location within Indianapolis Location within Indiana Location within the United States
- Location: 1454 E. 10th St., Indianapolis, Indiana
- Coordinates: 39°46′53″N 86°8′1″W
- Area: less than one acre
- Built: c. 1885
- Built by: Prosser, William
- NRHP reference No.: 75000046
- Added to NRHP: September 5, 1975

Prosser House is a historic home located at Indianapolis, Indiana. It was built about 1885, and is a small 1 1/2-story, stuccoed frame dwelling with applied decoration in cast concrete. It has a cross-gable roof with five dormers. The interior features elaborate plaster work.

It was listed on the National Register of Historic Places in 1975.

== See also ==
- National Register of Historic Places listings in Center Township, Marion County, Indiana
