= Calvin I. Fletcher House =

Historic house in Indiana, United States

- U.S. National Register of Historic Places
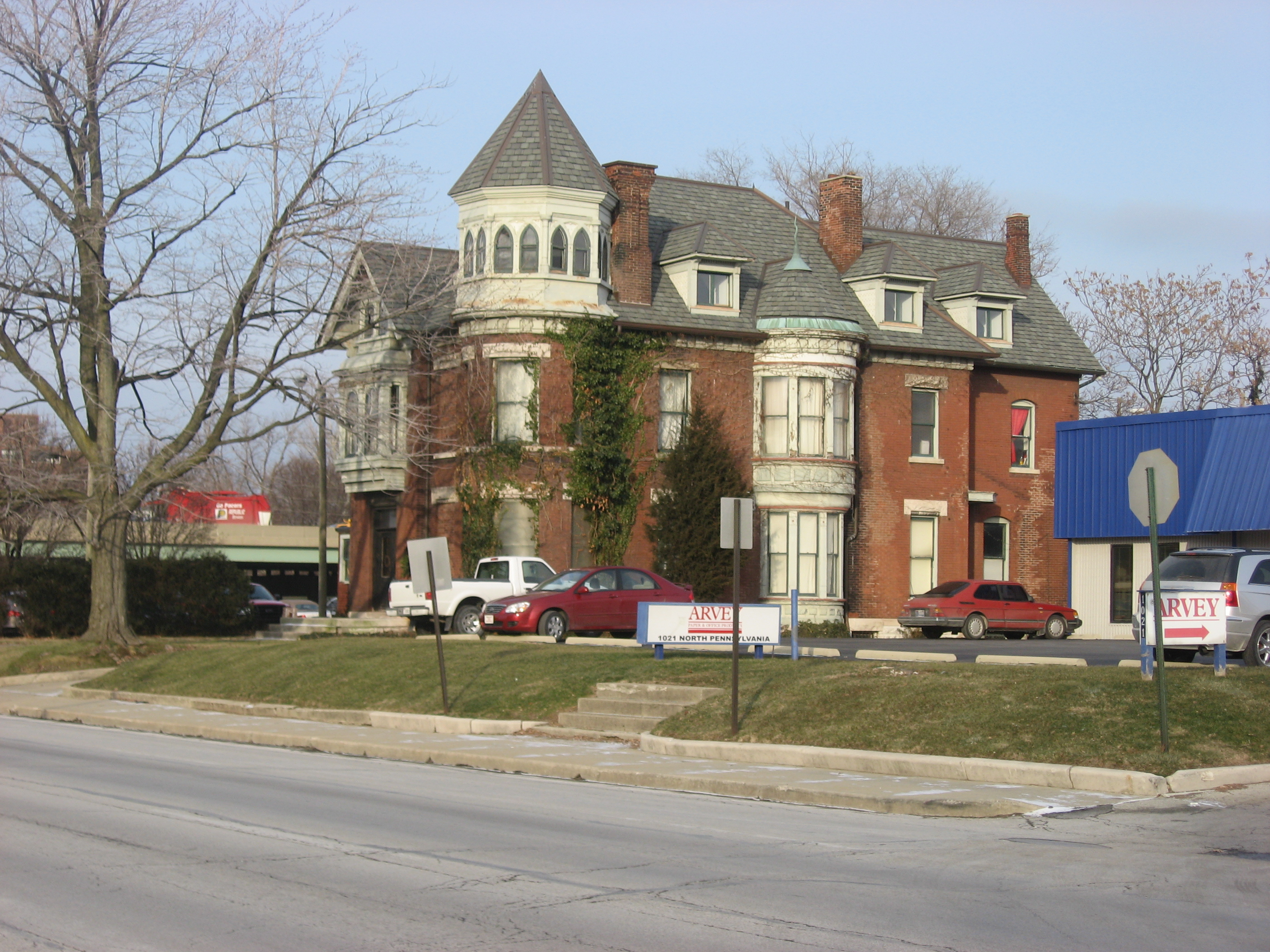
- Calvin I. Fletcher Home, January 2010

- Location within Indianapolis Location within Indiana Location within the United States
- Location: 1031 N. Pennsylvania St., Indianapolis, Indiana
- Coordinates: 39°46′55″N 86°9′19″W
- Area: less than one acre
- Built: 1895
- Architectural style: Queen Anne
- NRHP reference No.: 84001089
- Added to NRHP: March 1, 1984

Calvin I. Fletcher House is a historic home located at Indianapolis, Indiana. It was built in 1895, and is a 2 1/2-story, Queen Anne style brick dwelling on a limestone foundation. It has an elaborate hipped roof with gabled dormers. It features an eight-sided corner tower with pointed arched windows on each side. Also on the property is a contributing carriage house.

It was listed on the National Register of Historic Places in 1984.

== See also ==
- National Register of Historic Places listings in Center Township, Marion County, Indiana
