= August Sommer House =

Historic house in Indiana, United States

- U.S. National Register of Historic Places
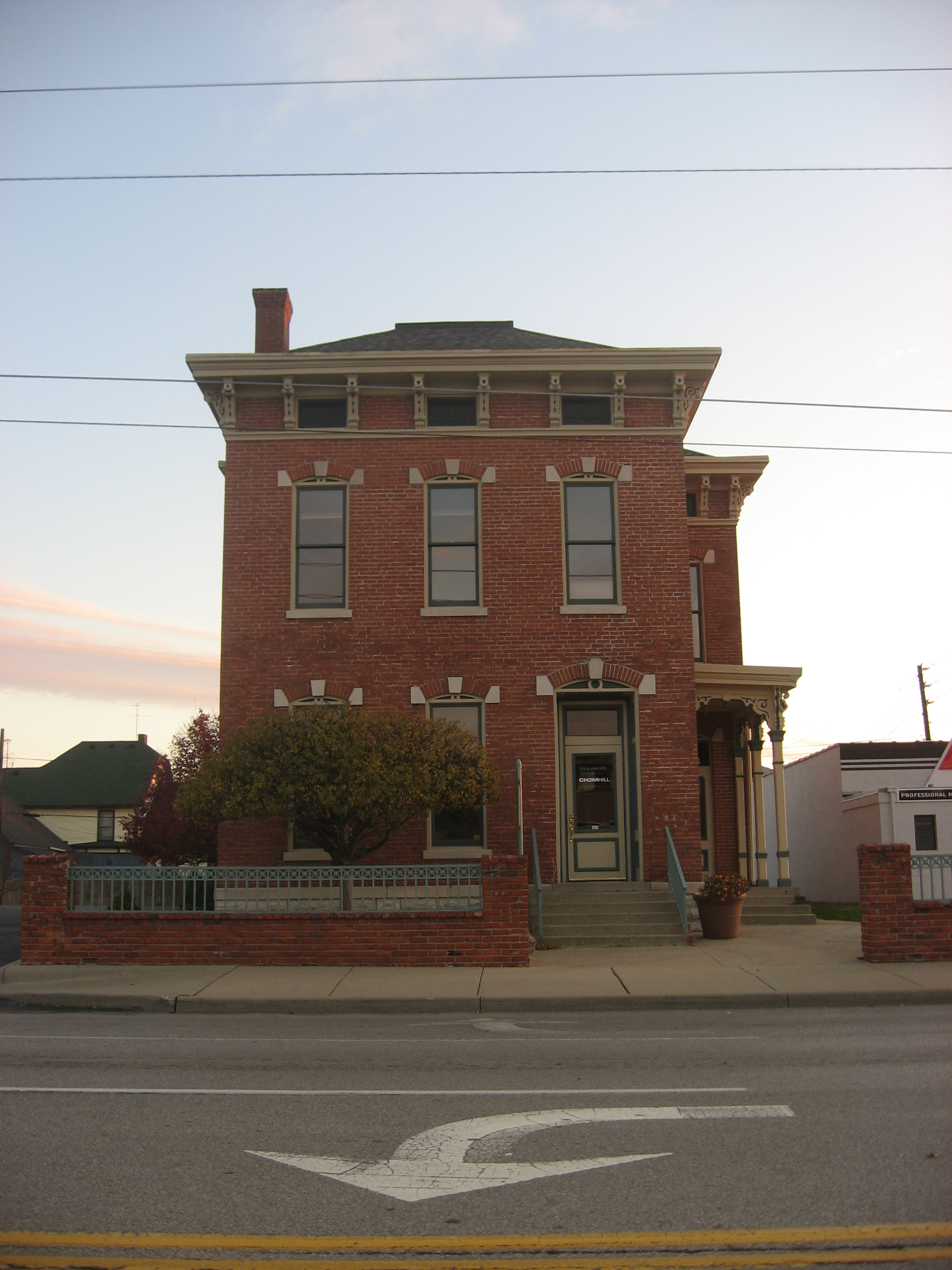
- August Sommer House, November 2010

- Location within Indianapolis Location within Indiana Location within the United States
- Location: 29 E. McCarty St., Indianapolis, Indiana
- Coordinates: 39°45′55″N 86°9′31″W
- Area: less than one acre
- Built: 1880
- Architectural style: Italianate
- NRHP reference No.: 80000060
- Added to NRHP: November 28, 1980

August Sommer House is a historic home located at Indianapolis, Indiana. It was built in 1880, and is a two-story, three-bay, Italianate style brick dwelling with rear addition. It sits on an ashlar limestone foundation and has segmental arched windows and a low hipped roof. It features a full-with front porch with cut-work detail. It has been converted to commercial uses.

It was listed on the National Register of Historic Places in 1980.

== See also ==
- National Register of Historic Places listings in Center Township, Marion County, Indiana
