= St. Philip Neri Parish Historic District =

Historic church in Indiana, United States

- U.S. National Register of Historic Places
- U.S. Historic district
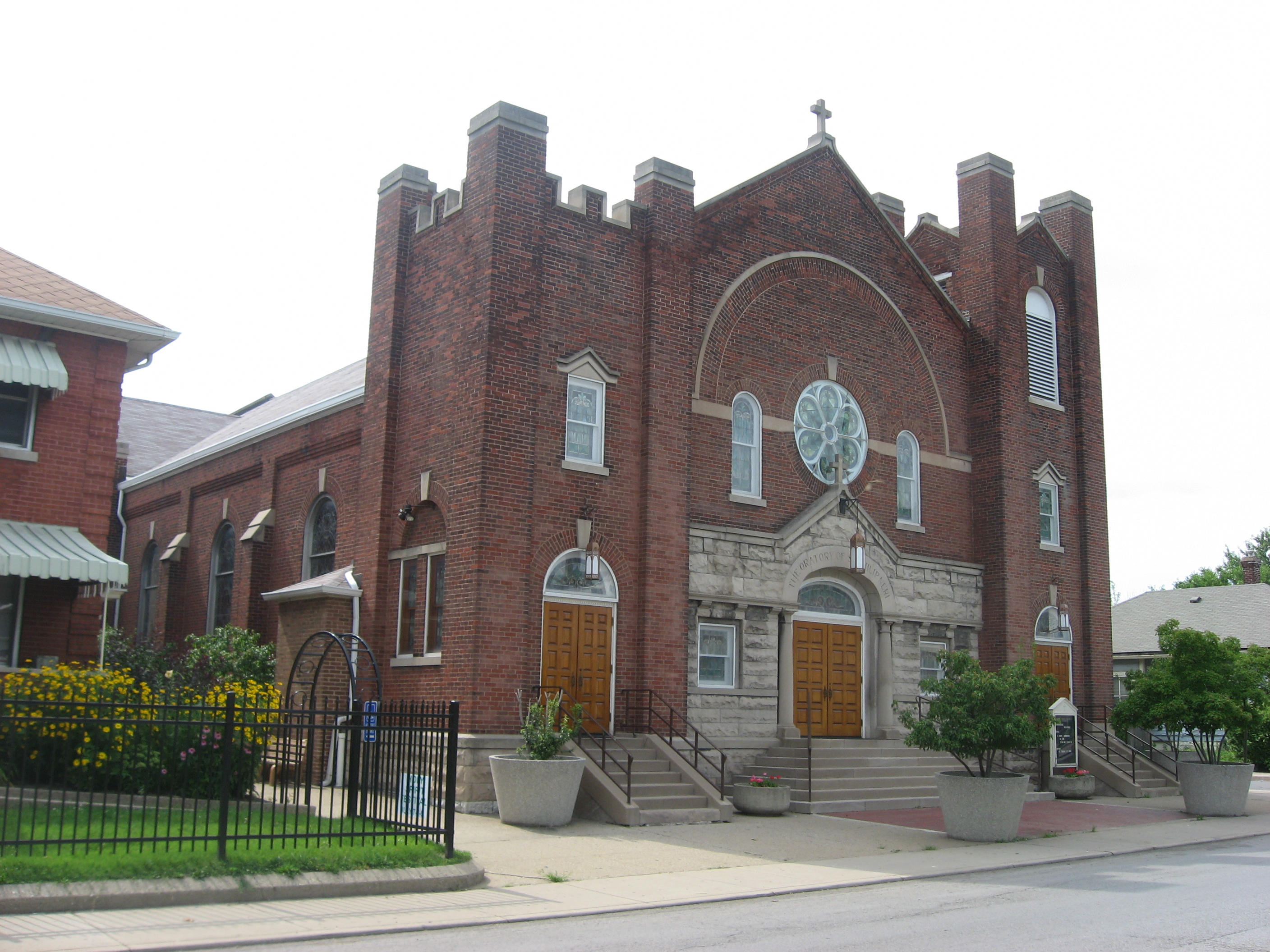
- St. Philip Neri Church, July 2011

- Location within Indianapolis Location within Indiana Location within the United States
- Location: 530 and 550 N. Rural St. and 545 N. Eastern Ave., Indianapolis, Indiana
- Coordinates: 39°46′32″N 86°7′2″W
- Area: 1.9 acres (0.77 ha)
- Built: 1909
- Architect: Bohlen & Son; Bedell, George V., et al.
- Architectural style: Bungalow/craftsman, Classical Revival, Romanesque
- NRHP reference No.: 96001007
- Added to NRHP: September 25, 1996

St. Philip Neri Parish Historic District is a historic Roman Catholic church complex and national historic district located at Indianapolis, Indiana. The district encompasses five contributing buildings: the church, rectory, former convent and school, school, and boiler house / garage. The church was built in 1909, and is a Romanesque Revival brick church with limestone trim. It features two- and three-story crenellated corner towers, a rose window with flanking round arched windows, and Doric order columns flanking the main entrance.

It was listed on the National Register of Historic Places in 1996.

== See also ==
- National Register of Historic Places listings in Center Township, Marion County, Indiana
