= The Seville =

- U.S. National Register of Historic Places
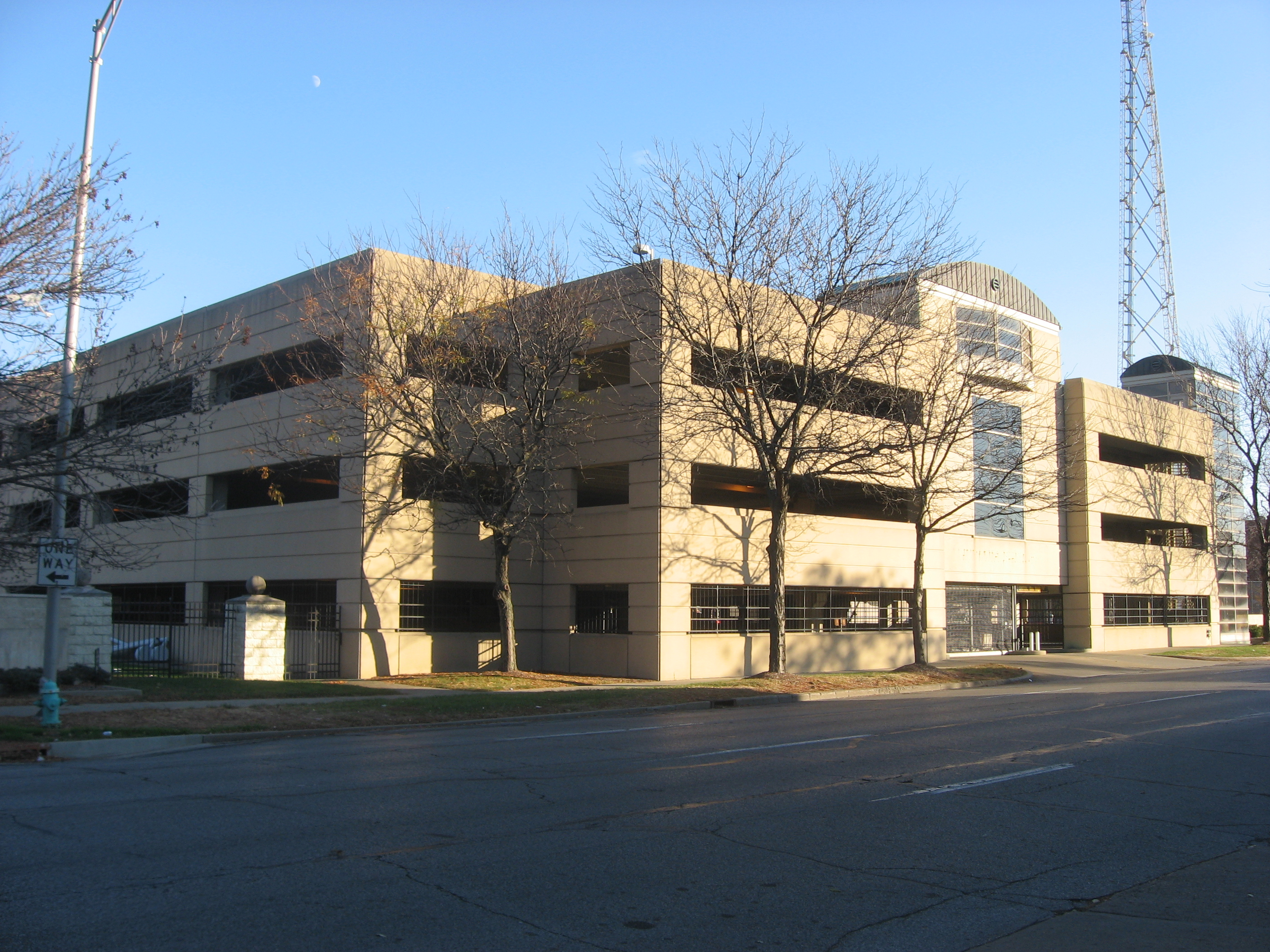
- Site of The Seville, November 2010

- Location within Indianapolis Location within Indiana Location within the United States
- Location: 1701 N. Illinois St., Indianapolis, Indiana
- Coordinates: 39°47′23″N 86°9′31″W
- Area: less than one acre
- Built: 1921
- Architect: George, Lawrence; MacLucas, William H.
- NRHP reference No.: 87000976
- Added to NRHP: June 22, 1987

The Seville was a historic apartment building located at Indianapolis, Indiana. It was built in 1921, and was a three-story, C-shaped, building on a raised basement. It featured elaborate Spanish-influenced terra cotta ornamentation and a wide overhanging stamped tin boxed cornice. It has been demolished.

It was listed on the National Register of Historic Places in 1987.

== See also ==
- National Register of Historic Places listings in Center Township, Marion County, Indiana
