= Watson Park Historic District =

Historic district in Indiana, United States

- U.S. National Register of Historic Places
- U.S. Historic district
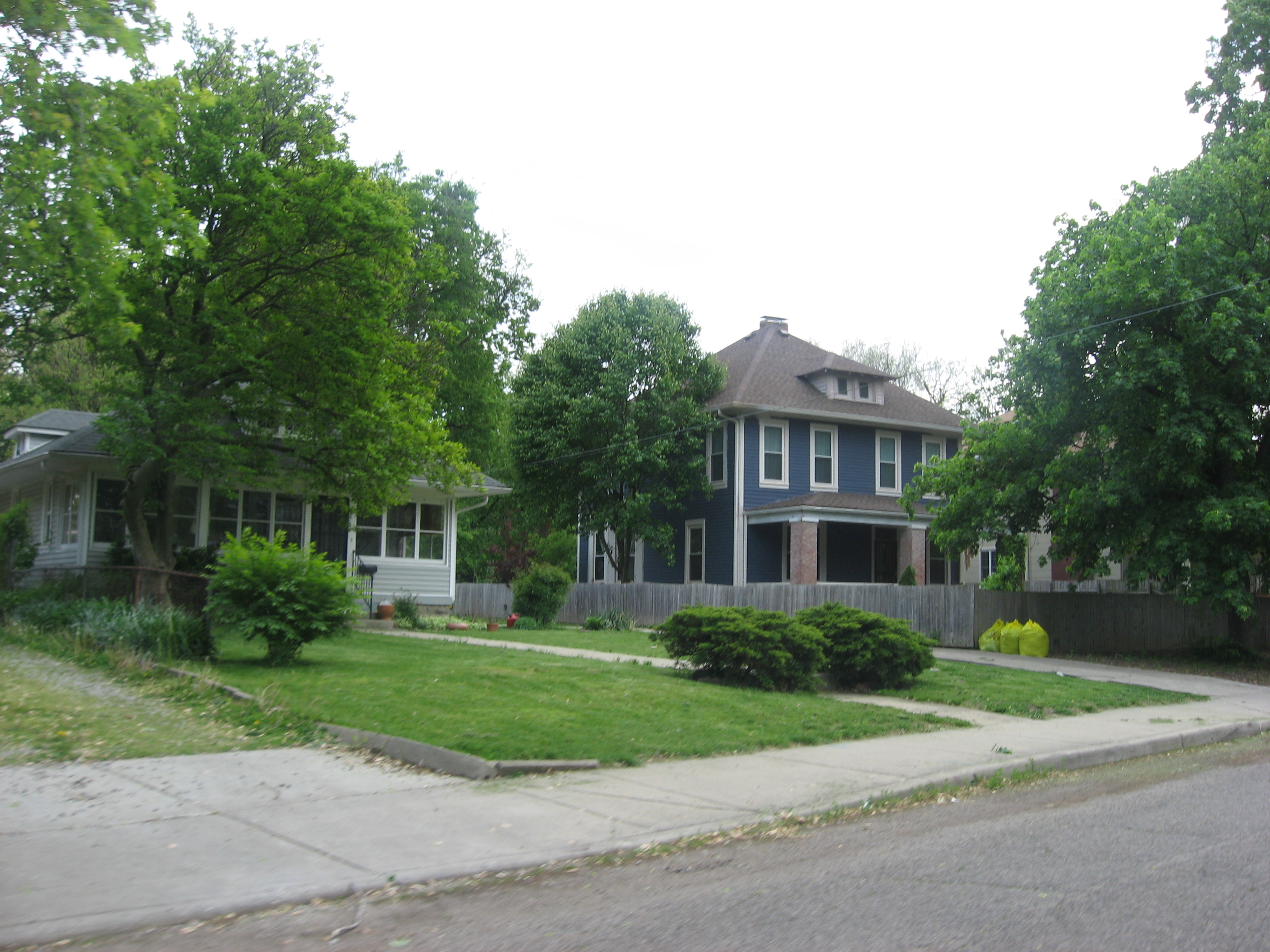
- Watson Park, 37th Street, April 2012

- Location within Indianapolis Location within Indiana Location within the United States
- Location: Roughly bounded by 38th St., Watson Rd., and Birchwood, Fairfield, and Central Aves., Indianapolis, Indiana
- Coordinates: 39°49′20″N 86°08′40″W
- Area: 110 acres (45 ha)
- Built: 1910
- Built by: Emerson Chaille & Company; Jose-Kuhn Lumber Company
- Architect: Architect's Small House Service Bureau
- Architectural style: Late 19th And 20th Century Revivals, Bungalow/craftsman
- NRHP reference No.: 12000336
- Added to NRHP: June 19, 2012

Watson Park Historic District, also known as Watson Road Historic District and Watson McCord Neighborhood, is a national historic district located at Indianapolis, Indiana. The district encompasses 402 contributing buildings and 4 contributing sites in a predominantly residential section of Indianapolis. They include 255 houses, 27 multiple family dwellings, and 120 garages. It was developed between about 1910 and 1960, and includes representative examples of Colonial Revival, Tudor Revival, and Bungalow / American Craftsman style architecture. Located in the district is the Watson Park Bird Sanctuary.

It was listed on the National Register of Historic Places in 2012.

== See also ==
- National Register of Historic Places listings in Center Township, Marion County, Indiana
