= P.C.C. & St. L. Railroad Freight Depot =

- P. C. C. & St. L. Railroad Freight Depot
- Formerly listed on the U.S. National Register of Historic Places
- Location within Indiana Location within the United States
- Location: 449 S. Pennsylvania St., Indianapolis, Indiana
- Area: 5 acres (2.0 ha)
- Built: 1916
- Built by: Jungclaus, William P., Co.
- Architect: Office of Chief Engineer, PCC & St.L RR
- NRHP reference No.: 95000697

Significant dates
- Added to NRHP: June 9, 1995
- Removed from NRHP: February 5, 1997

P. C. C. & St. L. Railroad Freight Depot, also known as the Central Union Warehouse, was a historic freight depot located at Indianapolis, Indiana. It was built in 1916 by the Pittsburgh, Cincinnati, Chicago and St. Louis Railroad. It was a one-story, brick warehouse building measuring 790 feet long and 70 feet wide. It has been demolished.

It was listed on the National Register of Historic Places in 1995 and delisted in 1997.

== See also ==
- National Register of Historic Places listings in Center Township, Marion County, Indiana
