= Vera and the Olga =

Historic houses in Indiana, United States

- U.S. National Register of Historic Places
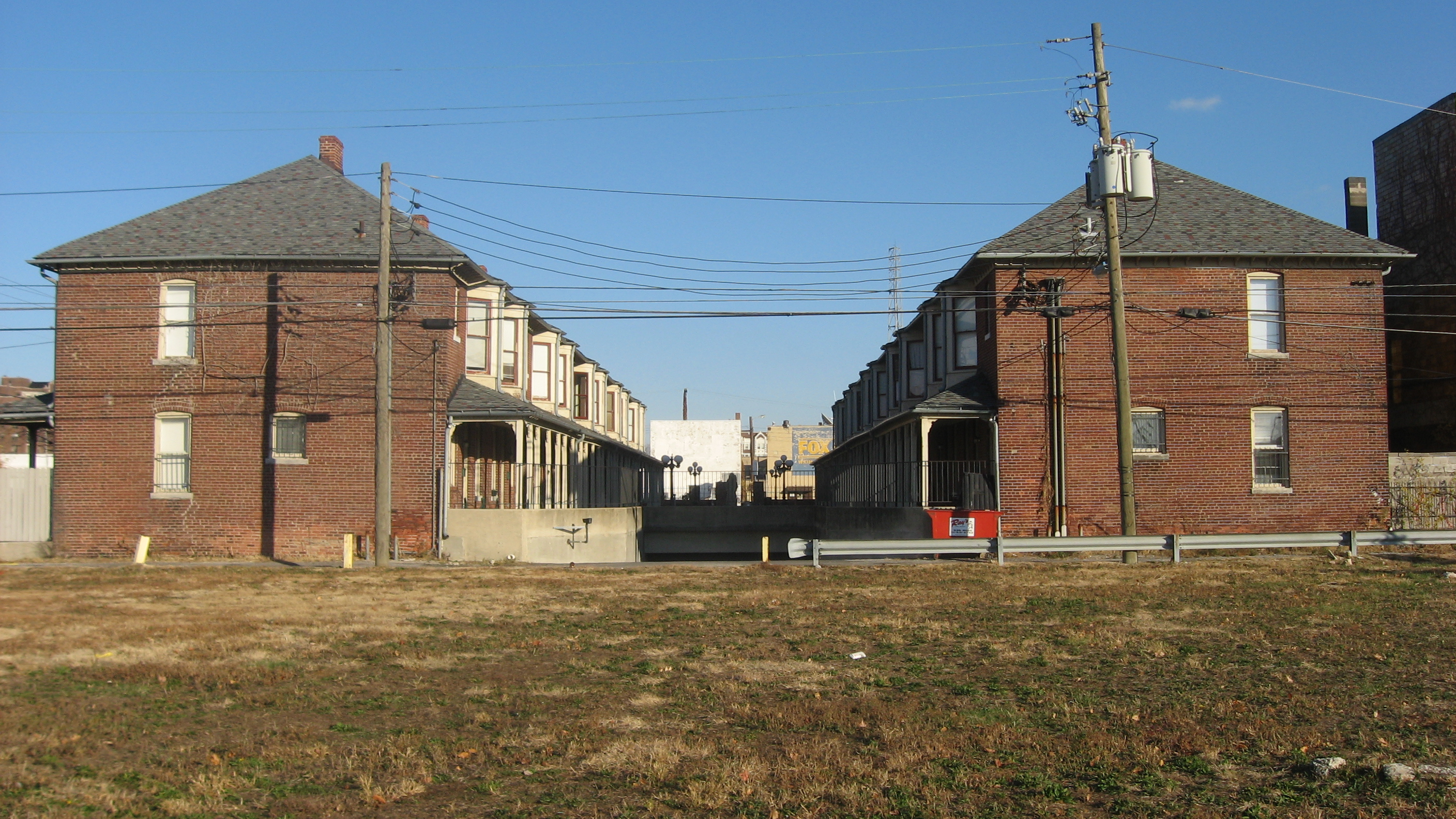
- Vera and the Olga, November 2010

- Location within Indianapolis Location within Indiana Location within the United States
- Location: 1440 and 1446 N. Illinois St., Indianapolis, Indiana
- Coordinates: 39°47′12″N 86°9′34″W
- Area: 1.8 acres (0.73 ha)
- Built: 1901
- NRHP reference No.: 84001196
- Added to NRHP: September 27, 1984

Vera and the Olga are two historic rowhouse blocks located at Indianapolis, Indiana. They were built in 1901, and are two-story, ten unit, red brick rows on a courtyard. Each building has a hipped roof and each unit is three bays wide. The buildings feature projecting bay windows and front porches.

It was listed on the National Register of Historic Places in 1984.

== See also ==
- National Register of Historic Places listings in Center Township, Marion County, Indiana
