= John Greenleaf Whittier School, No. 33 =

- U.S. National Register of Historic Places
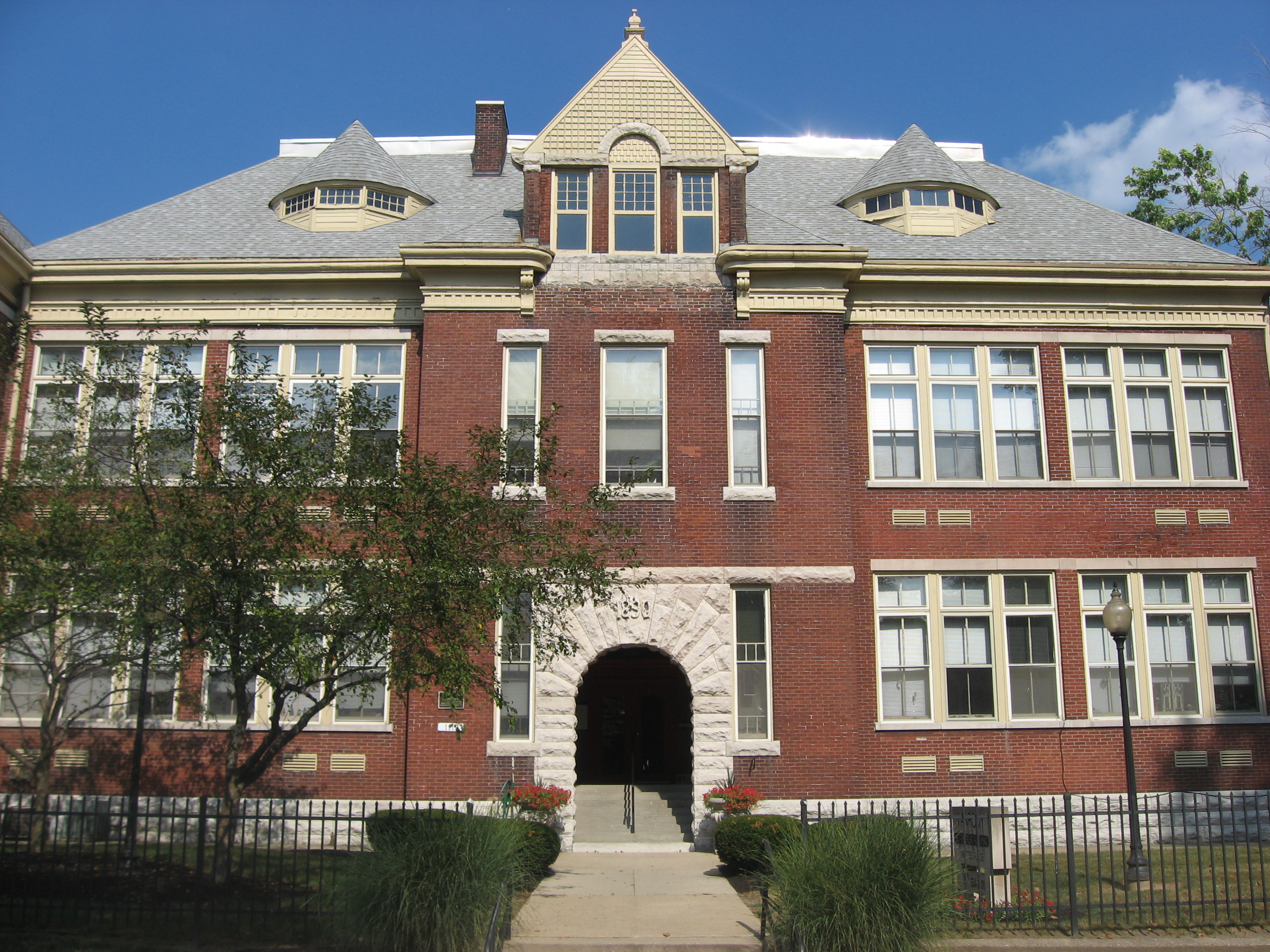
- John Greenleaf Whittier School, July 2011

- Location within Indianapolis Location within Indiana Location within the United States
- Location: 1119 N. Sterling St., Indianapolis, Indiana
- Coordinates: 39°46′58″N 86°7′42″W
- Area: 1 acre (0.40 ha)
- Built: 1890, 1902, 1927
- Architect: Morse, T. J.
- Architectural style: Queen Anne, Romanesque, Romanesque Revival
- NRHP reference No.: 81000029
- Added to NRHP: May 28, 1981

John Greenleaf Whittier School, No. 33 is a historic school building located at Indianapolis, Indiana. The original section was built in 1890, and is a two-story, rectangular, Romanesque Revival style brick building with limestone trim. It has a limestone foundation and a decked hip roof with Queen Anne style dormers. A rear addition was constructed in 1902, and a gymnasium and auditorium addition in 1927.

It was listed on the National Register of Historic Places in 1981.

== See also ==
- National Register of Historic Places listings in Center Township, Marion County, Indiana
