= H. Lauter Company Complex =

- U.S. National Register of Historic Places
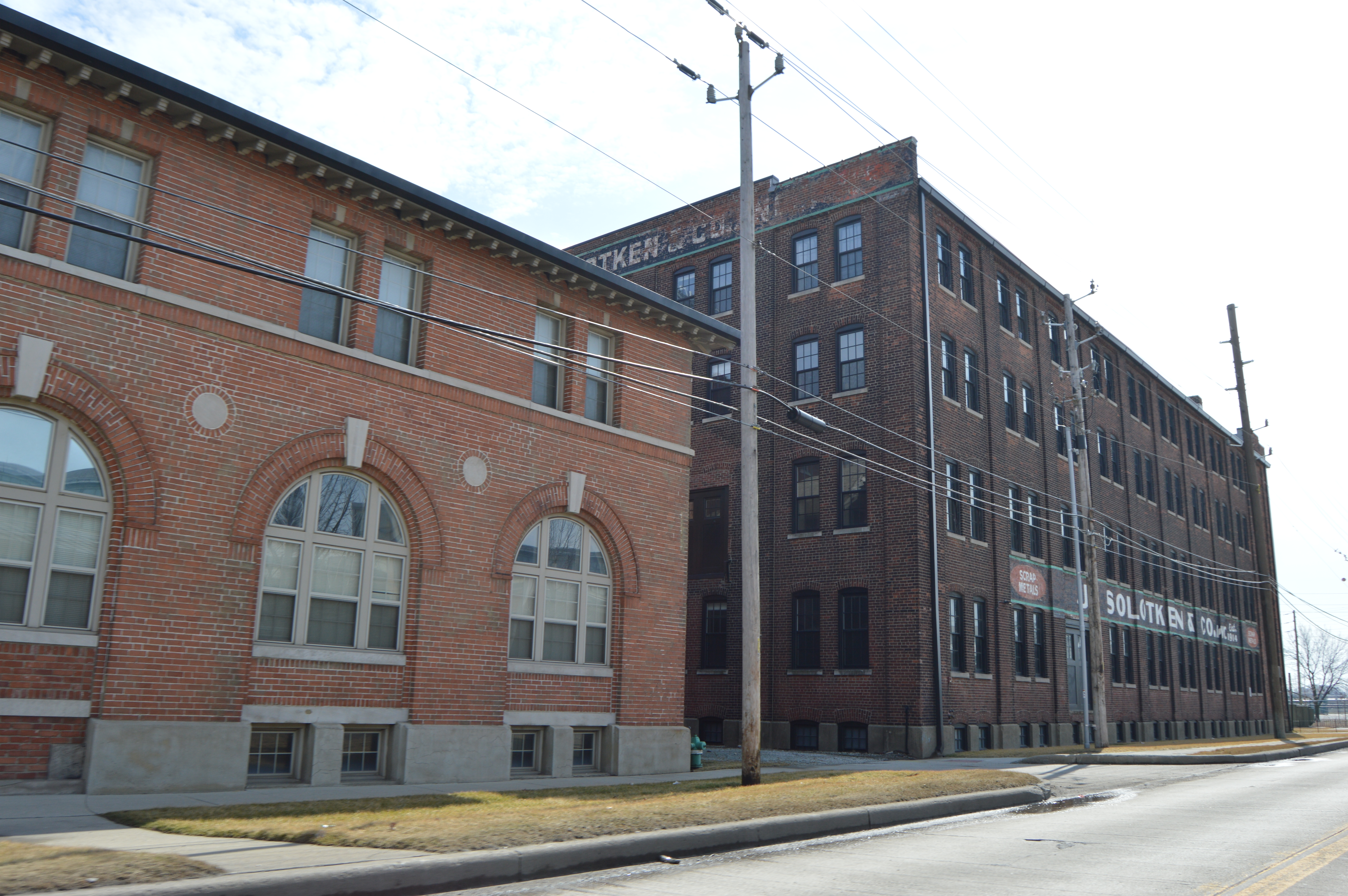
- H. Lauter Company Complex, March 2015

- Location within Indianapolis Location within Indiana Location within the United States
- Location: 35-101 S. Harding St., Indianapolis, Indiana
- Coordinates: 39°45′58″N 86°11′13″W
- Area: 5 acres (2.0 ha)
- Built: 1894-1912
- Architect: Hunter, Edgar O.; Rubush, Preston C.; Scherrer, Adolph
- Architectural style: Italianate, Classical Revival
- NRHP reference No.: 15000596
- Added to NRHP: September 22, 2015

H. Lauter Company Complex, also known as J. Solotken Company, Lauter Lofts, and Harding Street Lofts, is a historic factory complex located at Indianapolis, Indiana. It was built between 1894 and 1912, and includes the South Factory, the North Factory, and the Office Building. The factory buildings are in the Italianate and the office building is in the Classical Revival style. The North Factory is a four-story brick building with a raised full basement constructed sometime between 1908 and 1912. The Office Building is a two-story brick building constructed between 1899 and 1908 and has a truncated hipped roof. The four-story, U-shaped core of the South Factory was built in two phases; the eastern portion between 1894 and 1898 and the western portion in 1899. The H. Lauter Company furniture manufacturer began in 1894 and they continued to operate at the location until 1936. The buildings have been converted to condominiums and apartments.

It was listed on the National Register of Historic Places in 2015.

== See also ==
- National Register of Historic Places listings in Center Township, Marion County, Indiana
