= National Register of Historic Places listings in Center Township, Marion County, Indiana =

Location of Center Township in Marion County

This is a list of the National Register of Historic Places listings in Center Township, Marion County, Indiana.

This is intended to be a complete list of the properties and districts on the National Register of Historic Places in Center Township, Marion County, Indiana, United States. Latitude and longitude coordinates are provided for many National Register properties and districts; these locations may be seen together in an online map.

There are 272 properties and districts listed on the National Register in the county, including nine National Historic Landmarks. Because Indianapolis is coextensive with Marion County, properties are listed by township rather than by city or town. Center Township is the location of 193 of these properties and districts, including six of the National Historic Landmarks; these properties and districts are listed here. Properties and districts in Marion County's other townships are listed separately. The Indianapolis Park and Boulevard System, a historic district, is primarily in Center Township but extends into three other townships, and is therefore included on both lists. Another ten properties, including eight in Center Township, were once listed but have been removed.

This National Park Service list is complete through NPS recent listings posted August 21, 2026.

== Current listings ==
	Name on the Register	Image	Date listed	Location	Description
1	The Alameda	The Alameda	September 15, 1983 (#83000052)	37 W. St. Clair St. 39°46′41″N 86°09′33″W	
2	The Alexandra	The Alexandra	September 15, 1983 (#83000053)	402-416 N. New Jersey St. and 332-336 E. Vermont St. 39°46′22″N 86°09′02″W	
3	The Ambassador	The Ambassador	September 15, 1983 (#83000054)	39 E. 9th St. 39°46′44″N 86°09′21″W	
4	Architects and Builders Building	Architects and Builders Building	March 7, 2019 (#100003503)	333 N. Pennsylvania St. 39°46′21″N 86°09′22″W	
5	Athenaeum (Das Deutsche Haus)	Athenaeum (Das Deutsche Haus)	February 21, 1973 (#73000032)	401 E. Michigan St. 39°46′24″N 86°09′01″W	Designated a National Historic Landmark in 2016.
6	Crispus Attucks High School	Crispus Attucks High School	January 4, 1989 (#88003043)	1140 N. Martin Luther King, Jr., St. 39°46′58″N 86°10′12″W	
7	L.S. Ayres Annex Warehouse	L.S. Ayres Annex Warehouse	April 23, 1973 (#73000033)	14-22 W. Maryland St. 39°45′57″N 86°09′30″W	
8	The Baker	The Baker	September 15, 1983 (#83000055)	310 N. Alabama St. and 341 Massachusetts Ave. 39°46′18″N 86°09′09″W	
9	Balmoral Court	Balmoral Court	November 27, 1992 (#92001647)	3055 N. Meridian St. 39°48′43″N 86°09′22″W	
10	Bals-Wocher House	Bals-Wocher House	December 17, 1979 (#79000033)	951 N. Delaware St. 39°46′49″N 86°09′13″W	
11	Bates-Hendricks House	Bates-Hendricks House	April 11, 1977 (#77000143)	1526 S. New Jersey St. 39°44′47″N 86°09′03″W	
12	Belmont Beach		July 31, 2026 (#100013298)	1300 N. White River Parkway West Drive; bounded by White River Parkway West Drive on the south, and the White River on the north east of Belmont Ave. 39°47′12″N 86°11′46″W	
13	Beth-El Zedeck Temple	Beth-El Zedeck Temple	August 28, 2019 (#100004362)	3359 Ruckle St. 39°49′03″N 86°08′55″W	
14	Bethel A.M.E. Church	Bethel A.M.E. Church	March 21, 1991 (#91000269)	414 W. Vermont St. 39°46′23″N 86°09′56″W	
15	The Blacherne	The Blacherne	September 15, 1983 (#83000058)	402 N. Meridian St. 39°46′22″N 86°09′29″W	
16	Broad Ripple Park Carousel	Broad Ripple Park Carousel	February 27, 1987 (#87000839)	Meridian and 30th Sts. 39°48′39″N 86°09′21″W	
17	The Buckingham	The Buckingham	November 27, 1992 (#92001649)	3101-3119 N. Meridian St. 39°48′44″N 86°09′22″W	
18	The Burton	The Burton	September 15, 1983 (#83000059)	821-823 N. Pennsylvania St. 39°46′42″N 86°09′20″W	
19	William Buschmann Block	William Buschmann Block	August 26, 1988 (#88001225)	968-972 Fort Wayne Ave. 39°46′51″N 86°09′00″W	
20	Bush Stadium	Bush Stadium	June 26, 1995 (#95000703)	1501 W. 16th St. 39°47′15″N 86°11′21″W	
21	Byram-Middleton House	Byram-Middleton House	May 9, 1983 (#83000127)	1828 N. Illinois St. 39°47′29″N 86°09′34″W	
22	The Cathcart	The Cathcart	September 15, 1983 (#83000060)	103 E. 9th St. 39°46′44″N 86°09′20″W	
23	Central Court Historic District	Central Court Historic District	September 29, 2004 (#04001101)	3529-3575 Central Ave., 515-551 E. 36th St., and Central Ct. 39°49′20″N 86°08′53″W	
24	Central Library (Indianapolis-Marion County Public Library)	Central Library (Indianapolis-Marion County Public Library)	August 28, 1975 (#75000045)	40 E. St. Clair St. 39°46′42″N 86°09′24″W	
25	Chatham-Arch Historic District	Chatham-Arch Historic District	March 13, 1980 (#80000057)	Roughly bounded by Interstate 65, College Ave., and 10th, 11th, North, New Jersey, Cleveland, and East Sts. 39°46′42″N 86°08′48″W	
26	Christ Church Cathedral	Christ Church Cathedral	July 10, 1973 (#73000035)	131 Monument Circle; 39°46′09″N 86°09′27″W	
27	Christian Park School No. 82	Christian Park School No. 82	April 28, 1995 (#95000421)	4700 English Ave. 39°45′38″N 86°05′20″W	
28	Circle Theater	Circle Theater	June 16, 1980 (#80000058)	45 Monument Circle; 39°46′05″N 86°09′26″W	
29	City Market	City Market	March 27, 1974 (#74000030)	222 E. Market St. 39°46′07″N 86°09′12″W	
30	Cole Motor Car Company	Cole Motor Car Company	March 3, 1983 (#83000128)	730 E. Washington St. 39°46′02″N 86°08′39″W	
31	The Colonial	The Colonial	September 15, 1983 (#83000062)	126 E. Vermont St. and 402-408 N. Delaware St. 39°46′22″N 86°09′15″W	
32	Colored Knights of Pythias Castle Hall	Colored Knights of Pythias Castle Hall	November 15, 2021 (#100007176)	701, 703 North Senate and 234, 236, 238, 240, 242, 244 West Walnut Sts. 39°46′37″N 86°09′47″W	
33	Columbia Club	Columbia Club	January 27, 1983 (#83000063)	121 Monument Circle; 39°46′08″N 86°09′26″W	
34	Cottage Home Historic District	Cottage Home Historic District	February 23, 1990 (#90000328)	Dorman and St. Clair Sts. 39°46′40″N 86°08′17″W	
35	Coulter Flats	Coulter Flats	May 31, 1990 (#90000807)	2161 N. Meridian St. 39°47′48″N 86°09′25″W	
36	Crown Hill Cemetery	Crown Hill Cemetery	February 28, 1973 (#73000036)	Boulevard Pl., W. 32nd St., and Northwestern Ave. 39°49′08″N 86°10′21″W	
37	Crown Hill National Cemetery	Crown Hill National Cemetery	April 29, 1999 (#99000486)	700 W. 38th St. 39°49′00″N 86°10′23″W	
38	The Dartmouth	The Dartmouth	September 15, 1983 (#83000064)	221 E. Michigan St. 39°46′29″N 86°09′12″W	
39	Delaware Court	Delaware Court	September 15, 1983 (#83000065)	1001-1015 N. Delaware St. 39°46′52″N 86°09′13″W	
40	Delaware Flats	Delaware Flats	September 15, 1983 (#83000066)	120-128 N. Delaware St. 39°46′08″N 86°09′16″W	
41	The Devonshire	The Devonshire	September 15, 1983 (#83000067)	412 N. Alabama St. 39°46′24″N 86°09′09″W	
42	The Emelie	The Emelie	September 15, 1983 (#83000068)	326-330 N. Senate Ave. and 301-303 W. Vermont St. 39°46′21″N 86°09′48″W	
43	Emerson Heights Historic District	Emerson Heights Historic District	March 10, 2010 (#10000125)	Roughly bounded by Emerson Ave., Linwood Ave., and E. 10th and E. Michigan Sts. 39°46′40″N 86°05′17″W	
44	Engine House No. 23		May 23, 2023 (#100009019)	1002 Udell St. 39°48′27″N 86°10′42″W	
45	Esplanade Apartments	Esplanade Apartments	June 16, 1983 (#83000129)	3015 N. Pennsylvania St. 39°48′39″N 86°09′16″W	
46	Fame Laundry	Fame Laundry	March 4, 2020 (#100005040)	1352 North Illinois St. 39°47′07″N 86°09′34″W	
47	Federal Building	Federal Building	March 10, 2021 (#100006289)	575 North Pennsylvania St. 39°46′29″N 86°09′19″W	The Minton-Capehart Federal Building
48	Fidelity Trust Building	Fidelity Trust Building	September 27, 1980 (#80000382)	148 E. Market St. 39°46′07″N 86°09′17″W	
49	Flanner House Homes	Flanner House Homes	September 28, 2003 (#03000978)	Roughly bounded by Dr. Martin Luther King, Jr., Dr., 12th St., Fall Creek Parkway East Dr., and Lynn St. 39°47′04″N 86°10′16″W	
50	Fletcher Place Historic District	Fletcher Place Historic District	February 1, 1982 (#82000061)	Roughly bounded by railroad tracks, Interstates 65/70, East St., and Virginia Ave. 39°45′37″N 86°08′45″W	
51	Calvin I. Fletcher House	Calvin I. Fletcher House	March 1, 1984 (#84001089)	1031 N. Pennsylvania St. 39°46′55″N 86°09′19″W	
52	Ford Motor Company Indianapolis Assembly Plant		March 3, 2021 (#100006204)	1315 East Washington St. 39°45′59″N 86°08′11″W	
53	Benjamin Franklin Public School Number 36	Benjamin Franklin Public School Number 36	March 26, 2003 (#03000143)	2801 N. Capitol Ave. 39°48′32″N 86°09′38″W	
54	Garfield Drive Historic District		February 14, 2022 (#100007448)	Roughly bounded by Raymond and Shelby Sts., East Garfield and South Garfield Drs. 39°44′08″N 86°08′32″W	
55	Gaseteria, Inc.	Gaseteria, Inc.	March 13, 2013 (#13000089)	1031 E. Washington St. 39°46′00″N 86°08′23″W	
56	General German Protestant Orphans Home	General German Protestant Orphans Home	May 17, 1984 (#84001129)	1404 S. State St. 39°44′53″N 86°07′54″W	
57	Gibson Company Building	Gibson Company Building	June 17, 2009 (#09000431)	433-447 N. Capitol Ave. 39°46′24″N 86°09′38″W	
58	The Glencoe	The Glencoe	September 15, 1983 (#83000069)	627 N. Pennsylvania St. 39°46′35″N 86°09′20″W	
59	Alfred M. Glossbrenner Mansion	Alfred M. Glossbrenner Mansion	February 19, 1982 (#82000062)	3202 N. Meridian St. 39°48′50″N 86°09′25″W	
60	Golden Hill Historic District	Golden Hill Historic District	August 29, 1991 (#91001163)	Roughly bounded by 36th St., 37th St., Governors Rd., the rear lot lines behind Golden Hill Dr., and Central Canal; 39°49′09″N 86°11′06″W	
61	The Gramse	The Gramse	June 23, 2011 (#11000384)	2203 N. Broadway St. 39°47′52″N 86°08′46″W	
62	The Grover	The Grover	September 15, 1983 (#83000056)	615 N. Pennsylvania St. 39°46′34″N 86°09′20″W	
63	Hammond Block (Budnick's Trading Mart)	Hammond Block (Budnick's Trading Mart)	January 9, 1979 (#79000034)	301 Massachusetts Ave. 39°46′17″N 86°09′13″W	
64	Benjamin Harrison House	Benjamin Harrison House	October 15, 1966 (#66000010)	1204 N. Delaware St. 39°47′02″N 86°09′15″W	
65	HCS Motor Car Company	HCS Motor Car Company	June 17, 2009 (#09000432)	1402 N. Capitol Ave. 39°47′11″N 86°09′43″W	
66	Heier's Hotel	Heier's Hotel	September 22, 1986 (#86002704)	10-18 S. New Jersey St. 39°45′59″N 86°09′03″W	
67	Herron-Morton Place Historic District	Herron-Morton Place Historic District	June 16, 1983 (#83000131)	Roughly bounded by Central Ave. and 16th, Pennsylvania, and 22nd Sts. 39°47′34″N 86°09′09″W	
68	John Fitch Hill House	John Fitch Hill House	June 22, 2004 (#04000634)	1523 Southeastern Ave. 39°45′51″N 86°07′57″W	
69	Holy Rosary-Danish Church Historic District	Holy Rosary-Danish Church Historic District	March 13, 1986 (#86000327)	Roughly bounded by Virginia Ave., Interstates 65/70, and S. East St. 39°45′23″N 86°08′50″W	
70	John Hope School No. 26		September 2, 2025 (#100012178)	1301 East 16th Street; 39°47′18″N 86°08′12″W	
71	Horner-Terrill House	Horner-Terrill House	June 25, 2013 (#13000424)	410 S. Emerson Ave. 39°45′43″N 86°05′00″W	
72	Hotel Washington	Hotel Washington	July 17, 1980 (#80000056)	32 E. Washington St. 39°46′02″N 86°09′25″W	
73	Willard and Josephine Hubbard House	Willard and Josephine Hubbard House	June 7, 2016 (#16000336)	1941 N. Delaware St. 39°47′38″N 86°09′12″W	
74	Independent Turnverein	Independent Turnverein	December 22, 1983 (#83003577)	902 N. Meridian St. 39°46′45″N 86°09′28″W	
75	Indiana Avenue Historic District	Indiana Avenue Historic District	June 12, 1987 (#87000912)	500 block of Indiana Ave. between North St., Central Canal, Michigan, and West Sts. 39°46′29″N 86°09′57″W	
76	Indiana Oxygen Company	Indiana Oxygen Company	March 26, 1987 (#87000545)	351 S. East St. 39°45′41″N 86°08′56″W	
77	Indiana State Capitol	Indiana State Capitol	August 28, 1975 (#75000043)	W. Washington St. 39°46′07″N 86°09′45″W	
78	Indiana State Federation of Colored Women's Clubs	Indiana State Federation of Colored Women's Clubs	April 7, 1987 (#87000512)	2034 N. Capitol Ave. 39°47′37″N 86°09′42″W	
79	Indiana State Library and Historical Building	Indiana State Library and Historical Building	March 3, 1995 (#95000207)	140 N. Senate Ave. 39°46′11″N 86°09′50″W	
80	Indiana Theatre	Indiana Theatre	January 29, 1979 (#79000035)	134 W. Washington St. 39°46′02″N 86°09′39″W	
81	Indiana World War Memorial Historic District	Indiana World War Memorial Historic District	September 25, 1989 (#89001404)	Monument Circle, 200-800 blocks, N. Meridian St., 200-800 blocks, N. Pennsylvania St., and first blocks of E. Ohio, New York, E. Vermont, E. Michigan, E. North E. St. Clair, and E. 9th Sts. 39°46′30″N 86°09′24″W	
82	Indianapolis Athletic Club	Indianapolis Athletic Club	December 15, 2015 (#15000887)	350 N. Meridian St. 39°46′21″N 86°09′30″W	
83	Indianapolis Fire Headquarters and Municipal Garage	Indianapolis Fire Headquarters and Municipal Garage	June 27, 2002 (#02000686)	301 E. New York St. and 235 N. Alabama St. 39°46′14″N 86°09′08″W	
84	Indianapolis Masonic Temple	Indianapolis Masonic Temple	March 19, 2008 (#08000193)	525 N. Illinois Ave. 39°46′38″N 86°09′33″W	
85	Indianapolis News Building	Indianapolis News Building	March 7, 1984 (#84001133)	30 W. Washington St. 39°46′02″N 86°09′33″W	
86	Indianapolis Park and Boulevard System	Indianapolis Park and Boulevard System	March 28, 2003 (#03000149)	Roughly bounded by 38th St., Emerson, Southern and Tibbs Aves., extending along Fall Creek and Pleasant Run Parkways to Shadeland; 39°47′25″N 86°08′38″W	Extends into Lawrence, Warren, and Washington Townships, elsewhere in Marion County
87	Indianapolis Public Library Branch No. 1		August 23, 2022 (#100008055)	3101 Clifton St. 39°48′41″N 86°10′49″W	
88	Indianapolis Public Library Branch No. 3	Indianapolis Public Library Branch No. 3	March 15, 2016 (#16000077)	2822 E. Washington St. 39°46′07″N 86°06′57″W	
89	Indianapolis Public Library Branch No. 6	Indianapolis Public Library Branch No. 6	March 15, 2016 (#16000078)	1801 Nowland Ave. 39°47′06″N 86°07′45″W	
90	Indianapolis Union Railroad Station	Indianapolis Union Railroad Station	July 19, 1974 (#74000032)	39 Jackson Pl. 39°45′47″N 86°09′34″W	
91	Indianapolis Union Station-Wholesale District	Indianapolis Union Station-Wholesale District	July 14, 1982 (#82000067)	Roughly bounded by Capitol Ave. and Maryland, Delaware, and South Sts. 39°45′51″N 86°09′30″W	
92	Indianapolis White Castle Number 3	Indianapolis White Castle Number 3	June 23, 2011 (#11000385)	660 Fort Wayne Ave. 39°46′36″N 86°09′16″W	
93	Kahn Tailoring Company	Kahn Tailoring Company	November 29, 2019 (#100004717)	800 North Capitol Ave. 39°46′42″N 86°09′40″W	
94	Charles Kuhn House	Charles Kuhn House	April 13, 1989 (#89000237)	340 W. Michigan St. 39°46′27″N 86°09′52″W	
95	Laurel and Prospect District	Laurel and Prospect District	June 30, 1983 (#83000132)	1335 to 1419 E. Prospect St. 39°45′08″N 86°08′07″W	
96	H. Lauter Company Complex	H. Lauter Company Complex	September 22, 2015 (#15000596)	35-101 S. Harding St. 39°45′58″N 86°11′13″W	
97	Louis Levey Mansion	Louis Levey Mansion	December 22, 1978 (#78000047)	2902 N. Meridian St. 39°48′30″N 86°09′24″W	
98	Linwood Colonial Apartments	Linwood Colonial Apartments	April 19, 2006 (#06000308)	4421 E. Washington St. and 55 and 56 S. Linwood Ave. 39°46′14″N 86°05′34″W	
99	Lockefield Garden Apartments	Lockefield Garden Apartments	February 28, 1983 (#83000133)	900 Indiana Ave. 39°46′42″N 86°10′26″W	
100	Lockerbie Square Historic District	Lockerbie Square Historic District	February 23, 1973 (#73000038)	Indianapolis; specifically, bounded by Michigan and Davidson Sts., New York Ave., and New Jersey St. 39°46′16″N 86°08′52″W	Specific boundaries represent a boundary increase of July 28, 1987
101	The Lodge	The Lodge	September 15, 1983 (#83000073)	829 N. Pennsylvania St. 39°46′43″N 86°09′20″W	
102	Lombard Building	Lombard Building	June 1, 1982 (#82000068)	22-28 E. Washington St. 39°46′02″N 86°09′26″W	
103	Majestic Building	Majestic Building	November 20, 1980 (#80000059)	47 S. Pennsylvania St. 39°45′56″N 86°09′22″W	
104	P.R. Mallory Company Factory Historic District		March 5, 2021 (#100006208)	3029 East Washington St. and 101 South Parker Ave. 39°46′06″N 86°06′47″W	
105	Manchester Apartments	Manchester Apartments	April 1, 1998 (#98000302)	960-962 N. Pennsylvania St. 39°46′47″N 86°09′22″W	
106	Horace Mann Public School No. 13	Horace Mann Public School No. 13	June 26, 1986 (#86001389)	714 E. Buchanan St. 39°45′15″N 86°08′47″W	
107	Marott Hotel	Marott Hotel	June 25, 1982 (#82000063)	2625 N. Meridian St. 39°48′17″N 86°09′21″W	
108	Marott's Shoes Building	Marott's Shoes Building	May 9, 1983 (#83000135)	18-20 E. Washington St. 39°46′03″N 86°09′27″W	
109	The Martens	The Martens	September 15, 1983 (#83000070)	348-356 Indiana Ave. 39°46′20″N 86°09′47″W	
110	The Massachusetts	The Massachusetts	September 15, 1983 (#83000071)	421-427 Massachusetts Ave. 39°46′24″N 86°09′03″W	
111	Massachusetts Avenue Commercial District	Massachusetts Avenue Commercial District	December 2, 1982 (#82000064)	Roughly bounded by one block to either side of Massachusetts Ave. from Delaware St. to Interstate 65; 39°46′33″N 86°08′51″W	Boundary changes approved December 4, 2019
112	The Mayleeno	The Mayleeno	September 15, 1983 (#83000072)	416-418 E. Vermont St. 39°46′22″N 86°08′59″W	
113	McCormick Cabin Site	McCormick Cabin Site	May 28, 1981 (#81000028)	Off U.S. Route 40; 39°46′05″N 86°10′24″W	
114	The McKay	The McKay	September 15, 1983 (#83000074)	611 N. Pennsylvania St. 39°46′33″N 86°09′20″W	
115	George Philip Meier House	George Philip Meier House	September 23, 1982 (#82000065)	3128 N. Pennsylvania St. 39°48′46″N 86°09′18″W	
116	Merchants National Bank and Annex	Merchants National Bank and Annex	February 19, 1982 (#82000066)	11 S. Meridian St. and 7 E. Washington St. 39°46′00″N 86°09′29″W	
117	Meridian Park Historic District	Meridian Park Historic District	February 23, 1990 (#90000326)	Bounded by 34th St., Washington Boulevard, 30th St., and Pennsylvania St. 39°48′49″N 86°09′12″W	
118	Military Park	Military Park	October 28, 1969 (#69000002)	Bounded by West, New York, and Blackford Sts., and the canal 39°46′13″N 86°10′07″W	
119	Lovel D. Millikan House	Lovel D. Millikan House	October 18, 2017 (#100001608)	2530 N. Park Ave. 39°48′13″N 86°08′54″W	
120	Thomas Moore House	Thomas Moore House	March 15, 1984 (#84001137)	4200 Brookville Rd. 39°45′54″N 86°05′43″W	
121	Morris-Butler House	Morris-Butler House	February 20, 1973 (#73000037)	1204 N. Park Ave. 39°46′15″N 86°09′00″W	
122	Morrison Block (M. O'Connor Grocery Wholesalers)	Morrison Block (M. O'Connor Grocery Wholesalers)	November 15, 1979 (#79000038)	47 S. Meridian St. 39°45′56″N 86°09′29″W	
123	Mt. Pisgah Lutheran Church	Mt. Pisgah Lutheran Church	November 28, 1978 (#78000048)	701 N. Pennsylvania St. 39°46′37″N 86°09′20″W	
124	The Myrtle Fern	The Myrtle Fern	September 15, 1983 (#83000080)	221 E. 9th St. 39°46′44″N 86°09′11″W	
125	Nurses' Sunken Garden and Convalescent Park	Nurses' Sunken Garden and Convalescent Park	September 25, 1996 (#96001008)	Bounded by Michigan St., the Rotary Building, West Dr., and the Union Building; 39°46′35″N 86°10′56″W	
126	Old Indianapolis City Hall	Old Indianapolis City Hall	October 29, 1974 (#74000029)	202 N. Alabama St. 39°46′12″N 86°09′09″W	
127	Old Northside Historic District	Old Northside Historic District	March 24, 1978 (#78000049)	Roughly bounded by Interstate 65 and 16th, Bellefontaine, and Pennsylvania Sts.; also Pennsylvania and 16th Sts. 39°47′08″N 86°08′58″W	Pennsylvania and 16th represents a boundary increase of September 27, 1984
128	Oriental Lodge No. 500	Oriental Lodge No. 500	March 15, 2016 (#16000079)	2201 Central; 39°47′52″N 86°08′57″W	
129	Our Savior Lutheran Church		May 24, 2018 (#100002490)	261 W. 25th St. 39°48′10″N 86°09′45″W	
130	The Oxford	The Oxford	September 15, 1983 (#83000081)	316 E. Vermont St. 39°46′22″N 86°09′06″W	
131	Pearson Terrace	Pearson Terrace	March 1, 1984 (#84001187)	928-940 N. Alabama St. 39°46′49″N 86°09′08″W	
132	The Pennsylvania	The Pennsylvania	September 15, 1983 (#83000082)	919 N. Pennsylvania St. 39°46′46″N 86°09′19″W	
133	Pierson-Griffiths House	Pierson-Griffiths House	May 22, 1978 (#78000050)	1028 N. Delaware St. 39°46′56″N 86°09′15″W	
134	The Plaza	The Plaza	September 15, 1983 (#83000083)	902 N. Pennsylvania St. and 36 E. 9th St. 39°46′45″N 86°09′21″W	
135	The Propylaeum (John W. Schmidt House)	The Propylaeum (John W. Schmidt House)	June 19, 1973 (#73000039)	1410 N. Delaware St. 39°47′11″N 86°09′16″W	
136	Prosser House	Prosser House	September 5, 1975 (#75000046)	1454 E. 10th St. 39°46′53″N 86°08′01″W	
137	Ralph Waldo Emerson Indianapolis Public School No. 58	Ralph Waldo Emerson Indianapolis Public School No. 58	December 6, 2004 (#04001309)	321 N. Linwood St. 39°46′29″N 86°05′32″W	
138	Ransom Place Historic District	Ransom Place Historic District	December 10, 1992 (#92001650)	Roughly bounded by 10th, St. Clair, West, and Camp Sts. 39°46′44″N 86°10′11″W	
139	Reserve Loan Life Insurance Company	Reserve Loan Life Insurance Company	February 23, 1990 (#90000331)	429 N. Pennsylvania St. 39°46′29″N 86°09′20″W	
140	James Whitcomb Riley House	James Whitcomb Riley House	October 15, 1966 (#66000799)	528 Lockerbie St. 39°46′20″N 86°08′53″W	
141	The Rink	The Rink	September 15, 1983 (#83000075)	401 N. Illinois St. 39°46′22″N 86°09′34″W	
142	Rink's Womens Apparel Store	Rink's Womens Apparel Store	September 27, 1984 (#84001188)	29 N. Illinois St. 39°46′04″N 86°09′34″W	
143	Riverside Drive Historic District		June 4, 2019 (#100004043)	Bounded by W. 29th St., N. Harding St., W. 21st St., and E. Riverside Dr. 39°48′09″N 86°11′21″W	
144	Rivoli Theater	Rivoli Theater	June 22, 2004 (#04000630)	3155 E. 10th St. 39°46′52″N 86°06′41″W	
145	Roberts Park Methodist Episcopal Church	Roberts Park Methodist Episcopal Church	August 19, 1982 (#82000069)	401 N. Delaware St. 39°46′22″N 86°09′14″W	
146	James E. Roberts School 97	James E. Roberts School 97	March 3, 2021 (#100006205)	1401 East 10th St. 39°46′52″N 86°08′05″W	
147	Saint James Court	Saint James Court	February 18, 1987 (#87000071)	2102-2108 N. Meridian St. 39°47′43″N 86°09′27″W	
148	St. John's Church and Rectory	St. John's Church and Rectory	September 17, 1980 (#80000061)	121 S. Capitol Ave. and 124 and 126 W. Georgia St. 39°45′52″N 86°09′41″W	
149	St. John's Missionary Baptist Church		January 20, 2026 (#100012585)	1701 Dr. Andrew J. Brown Avenue; 39°47′26″N 86°08′07″W	
150	St. Joseph Neighborhood Historic District	St. Joseph Neighborhood Historic District	June 27, 1991 (#91000794)	Roughly bounded by St. Clair, Delaware, and 11th Sts., and Central and Ft. Wayne Aves. 39°46′50″N 86°09′08″W	
151	St. Mary's Catholic Church	St. Mary's Catholic Church	November 9, 1977 (#77000020)	317 N. New Jersey St. 39°46′20″N 86°09′00″W	
152	St. Philip Neri Parish Historic District	St. Philip Neri Parish Historic District	September 25, 1996 (#96001007)	530 and 550 N. Rural St. and 545 N. Eastern Ave. 39°46′32″N 86°07′02″W	
153	The Savoy	The Savoy	September 15, 1983 (#83000076)	36 W. Vermont St. 39°46′22″N 86°09′32″W	
154	Schnull-Rauch House	Schnull-Rauch House	November 14, 1979 (#79000037)	3050 N. Meridian St. 39°48′41″N 86°09′26″W	
155	Scottish Rite Cathedral	Scottish Rite Cathedral	June 6, 1983 (#83000136)	650 N. Meridian St. 39°46′34″N 86°09′29″W	
156	Selig's Dry Goods Company Building	Selig's Dry Goods Company Building	May 17, 1984 (#84001190)	20 W. Washington St. 39°46′02″N 86°09′30″W	
157	The Seville	The Seville	June 22, 1987 (#87000976)	1701 N. Illinois St. 39°47′23″N 86°09′31″W	
158	Sheffield Inn	Sheffield Inn	April 1, 1998 (#98000301)	956-58 N. Pennsylvania St. 39°46′50″N 86°09′21″W	
159	The Shelton	The Shelton	September 15, 1983 (#83000077)	825 N. Delaware St. 39°46′42″N 86°09′13″W	
160	Shortridge High School	Shortridge High School	September 15, 1983 (#83000078)	3401 N. Meridian St. 39°49′08″N 86°09′19″W	
161	Shortridge-Meridian Street Apartments Historic District	Shortridge-Meridian Street Apartments Historic District	March 15, 2000 (#00000195)	Roughly between 34th and 38th Sts., along N. Meridian and N. Pennsylvania Sts. 39°49′16″N 86°09′24″W	
162	The Sid-Mar	The Sid-Mar	September 15, 1983 (#83000079)	401-403 Massachusetts Ave. 39°46′22″N 86°09′07″W	
163	August Sommer House	August Sommer House	November 28, 1980 (#80000060)	29 E. McCarty St. 39°45′55″N 86°09′31″W	
164	The Spink	The Spink	September 15, 1983 (#83000084)	230 E. 9th St. 39°46′45″N 86°09′10″W	
165	Spink Arms Hotel	Spink Arms Hotel	December 7, 2001 (#01001345)	410 N. Meridian St. 39°46′14″N 86°09′30″W	
166	State and Prospect District	State and Prospect District	June 30, 1983 (#83000137)	State Ave. and Prospect St. 39°45′09″N 86°07′49″W	
167	State Soldiers and Sailors Monument	State Soldiers and Sailors Monument	February 23, 1973 (#73000040)	Monument Circle; 39°46′06″N 86°09′29″W	
168	South Side Turnverein Hall	South Side Turnverein Hall	December 3, 2019 (#100004724)	306 Prospect St. 39°45′09″N 86°09′12″W	
169	Stutz Motor Car Company Factory	Stutz Motor Car Company Factory	August 23, 2022 (#100008060)	1060 North Capitol Ave. and 217 West 10th St. 39°46′54″N 86°09′43″W	
170	The Sylvania	The Sylvania	September 15, 1983 (#83000086)	801 N. Pennsylvania St. and 108 E. St. Clair St. 39°46′41″N 86°09′20″W	
171	Taylor Carpet Company Building	Taylor Carpet Company Building	March 1, 1984 (#84001192)	26 W. Washington St. 39°46′02″N 86°09′32″W	
172	Test Building	Test Building	June 16, 1983 (#83000138)	54 Monument Circle; 39°46′06″N 86°09′32″W	
173	U.S. Arsenal (Arsenal Technical High School)	U.S. Arsenal (Arsenal Technical High School)	May 19, 1976 (#76000034)	1500 E. Michigan St. 39°46′40″N 86°07′59″W	
174	U.S. Courthouse and Post Office	U.S. Courthouse and Post Office	January 11, 1974 (#74000033)	46 E. Ohio St. 39°46′14″N 86°09′25″W	
175	United States Corrugated-Fibre Box Company Plant		March 6, 2024 (#100010031)	1411 Roosevelt Avenue; 39°47′07″N 86°08′06″W	
176	University Club	University Club	May 24, 2018 (#100002494)	970 N. Delaware St. 39°46′51″N 86°09′14″W	
177	University Park	University Park	September 7, 1989 (#89001405)	Bounded by Vermont, Pennsylvania, New York, and Meridian Sts. 39°46′18″N 86°09′24″W	
178	Vera and the Olga	Vera and the Olga	September 27, 1984 (#84001196)	1440 and 1446 N. Illinois St. 39°47′12″N 86°09′34″W	
179	The Vienna	The Vienna	September 15, 1983 (#83000087)	306 E. New York St. 39°46′17″N 86°09′08″W	
180	Virginia Avenue District	Virginia Avenue District	June 30, 1983 (#83003442)	Roughly Virginia Ave. from Grove Ave. to Prospect and Morris Sts. 39°45′10″N 86°08′25″W	
181	Madam C.J. Walker Building	Madam C.J. Walker Building	July 17, 1980 (#80000062)	617 Indiana Ave. 39°46′33″N 86°10′01″W	
182	Washington Street-Monument Circle Historic District	Washington Street-Monument Circle Historic District	September 26, 1997 (#97001179)	Roughly bounded by Delaware, Ohio, Capitol, and W. Maryland Sts. 39°46′04″N 86°09′29″W	
183	H.P. Wasson & Company Building	H.P. Wasson & Company Building	December 24, 1997 (#97001539)	2 W. Washington and 2 N. Meridian Sts. 39°46′02″N 86°09′30″W	
184	Watson Park Historic District	Watson Park Historic District	June 19, 2012 (#12000336)	Roughly bounded by 38th St., Watson Rd., and Birchwood, Fairfield, and Central Aves. 39°49′20″N 86°08′40″W	
185	West Washington Street Pumping Station	West Washington Street Pumping Station	July 17, 1980 (#80000063)	801 W. Washington St. 39°46′00″N 86°10′19″W	
186	Wheeler-Schebler Carburetor Company	Wheeler-Schebler Carburetor Company	March 22, 2004 (#04000210)	1234 Barth Ave. 39°45′00″N 86°08′28″W	
187	John Greenleaf Whittier School, No. 33	John Greenleaf Whittier School, No. 33	May 28, 1981 (#81000029)	1119 N. Sterling St. 39°46′58″N 86°07′42″W	
188	The Wil-Fra-Mar	The Wil-Fra-Mar	September 15, 1983 (#83000088)	318-320 E. Vermont St. 39°46′22″N 86°09′05″W	
189	The Wilson	The Wilson	September 15, 1983 (#83000089)	643 Ft. Wayne Ave. 39°46′34″N 86°09′17″W	
190	Woodruff Place	Woodruff Place	July 31, 1972 (#72000012)	Roughly bounded by 1700-2000 E. Michigan and E. 10th Sts. 39°46′40″N 86°07′42″W	
191	Woodstock Country Club	Woodstock Country Club	June 21, 2007 (#07000561)	1301 W. 38th St. 39°49′22″N 86°11′02″W	
192	The Wyndham	The Wyndham	September 15, 1983 (#83000090)	1040 N. Delaware St. 39°46′56″N 86°09′14″W	
193	YWCA Blue Triangle Residence Hall	YWCA Blue Triangle Residence Hall	September 27, 1988 (#88001574)	725 N. Pennsylvania St. 39°46′39″N 86°09′19″W	

== Former listings ==
	Name on the Register	Image	Date listed	Date removed	Location	Description
1	The Chadwick	The Chadwick	September 15, 1983 (#83000061)	March 21, 2011	1005 N. Pennsylvania St. 39°46′52″N 86°09′19″W	Destroyed by fire in January 2011
2	The Harriett	The Harriett	September 15, 1983 (#83000057)	June 8, 2011	124-128 N. East St. 39°46′09″N 86°08′57″W	
3	Indianapolis Chair Manufacturing Company	Indianapolis Chair Manufacturing Company	November 23, 1984 (#84000361)	July 16, 1986	330 W. New York St. 39°46′18″N 86°09′52″W	Demolished in 1986
4	Jackson Buildings	Jackson Buildings	December 13, 1984 (#84000496)	May 24, 1993	419 and 425 E. Washington St. 39°46′02″N 86°08′58″W	
5	Maennerchor Building	Maennerchor Building	January 16, 1974 (#74002340)	November 18, 1974	102 W. Michigan St. 39°46′02″N 86°08′58″W	Demolished in 1974
6	P.C.C. & St. L. Railroad Freight Depot		June 9, 1995 (#95000697)	February 5, 1997	449 S. Pennsylvania St. 39°45′36″N 86°09′22″W	Demolished in 1996
7	Caleb Blood Smith Historic Site	Caleb Blood Smith Historic Site	January 31, 1972 (#72001591)	July 6, 1972	Bounded by Vermont, West, New York, and California Sts. 39°46′19″N 86°10′05″W	Demolished in 1971
8	St. Clair		September 15, 1983 (#83000085)	December 4, 1991	109 W. St. Clair St.	Destroyed by fire in January 1991

== See also ==
- List of National Historic Landmarks in Indiana
- National Register of Historic Places listings in Indiana
- Listings in neighboring counties: Boone, Hamilton, Hancock, Hendricks, Johnson, Morgan, Shelby
