= John Fitch Hill House =

Historic house in Indiana, United States

- U.S. National Register of Historic Places
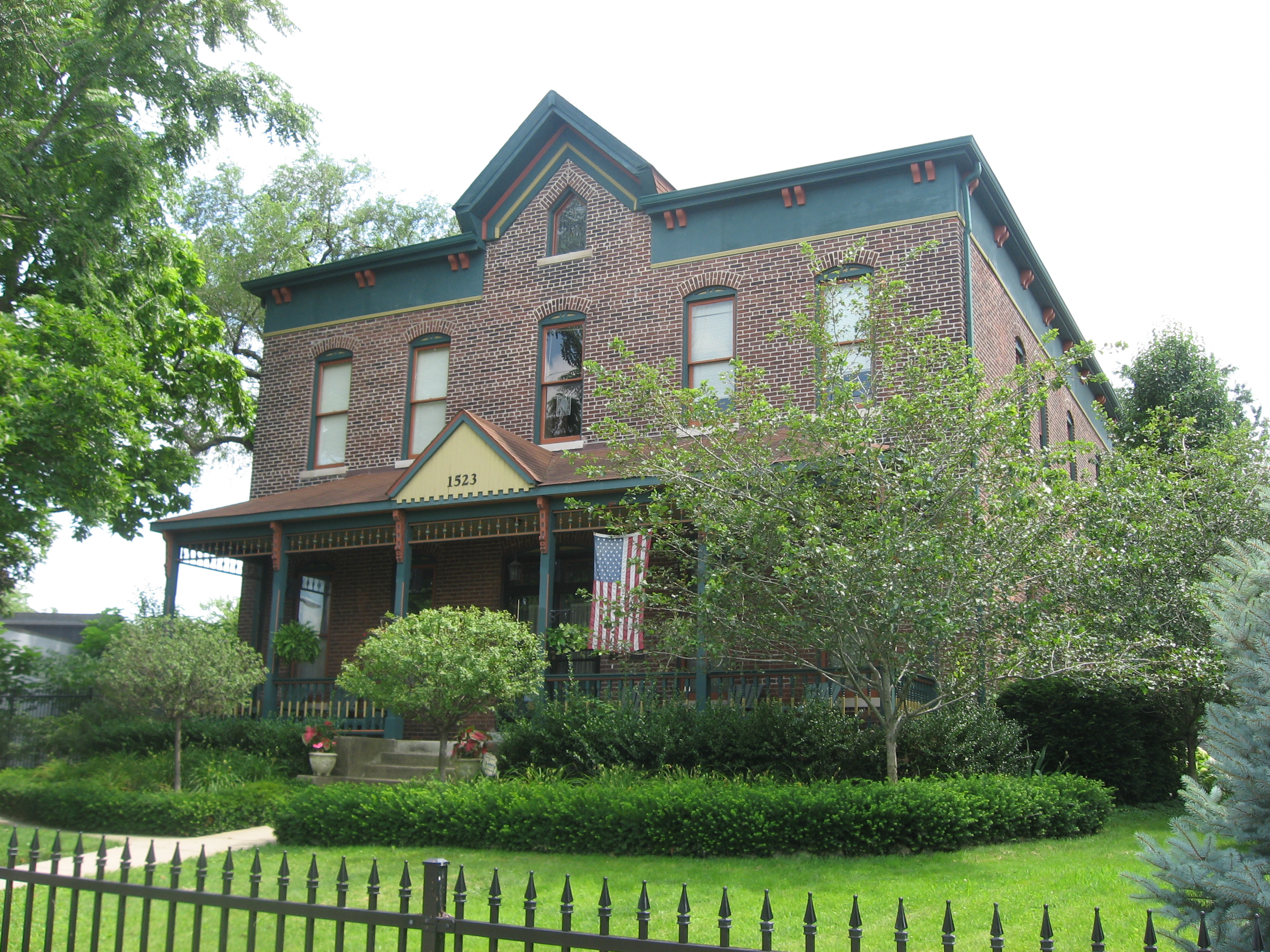
- John Fitch Hill House, July 2011

- Location within Indianapolis Location within Indiana Location within the United States
- Location: 1523 Southeastern Ave., Indianapolis, Indiana
- Coordinates: 39°45′57″N 86°7′57″W
- Area: less than one acre
- Built: c. 1852
- Built by: Hill, John Fitch
- Architectural style: Italianate
- NRHP reference No.: 04000634
- Added to NRHP: June 22, 2004

John Fitch Hill House is a historic home located at Indianapolis, Indiana. It was built about 1852, and is a two-story, five-bay, Italianate style frame dwelling. It has a low hipped roof with double brackets and a centered gable. It features a full-width front porch added in the 1880s.

It was listed on the National Register of Historic Places in 2004.

== See also ==
- National Register of Historic Places listings in Center Township, Marion County, Indiana
