= Horner–Terrill House =

Historic home located at Indianapolis, Indiana, United States

- U.S. National Register of Historic Places
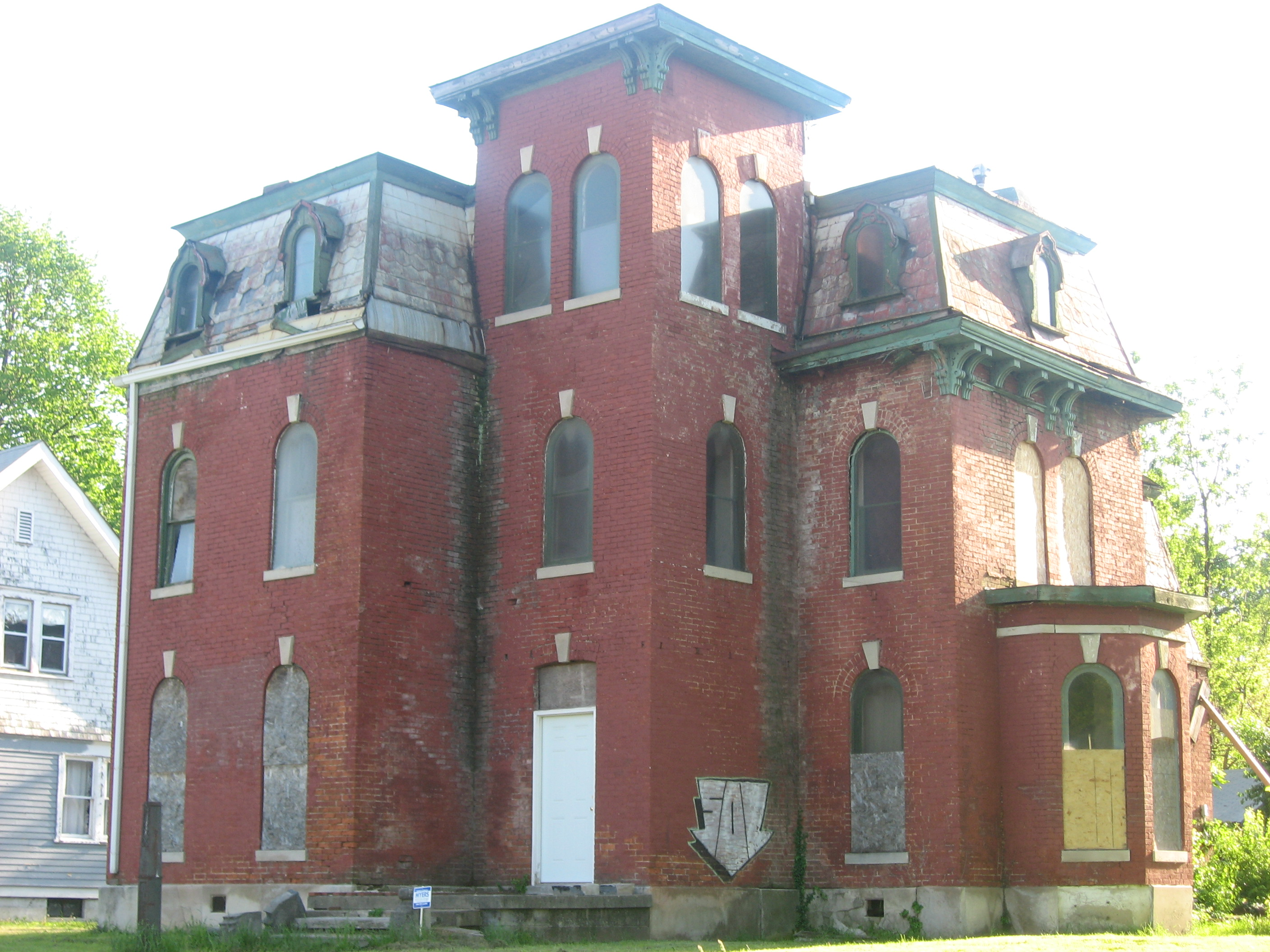
- Horner–Terrill House, May 2013

- Location within Indianapolis Location within Indiana Location within the United States
- Location: 410 S. Emerson Ave., Indianapolis, Indiana
- Coordinates: 39°45′43″N 86°5′00″W
- Area: 0.704 acres (0.285 ha)
- Built: c. 1875
- Architectural style: Second Empire
- NRHP reference No.: 13000424
- Added to NRHP: June 25, 2013

Horner–Terrill House is a historic home located at Indianapolis, Indiana. It was built about 1875, and is a 2 1/2-story, roughly L-shaped, Second Empire style brick dwelling with limestone detailing. It features a three-story tower, mansard roof, and round arched openings. Also on the property is a contributing garage (c. 1930). It was listed on the National Register of Historic Places in 2013.

== See also ==
- National Register of Historic Places listings in Center Township, Marion County, Indiana
