= Esplanade Apartments =

- U.S. National Register of Historic Places
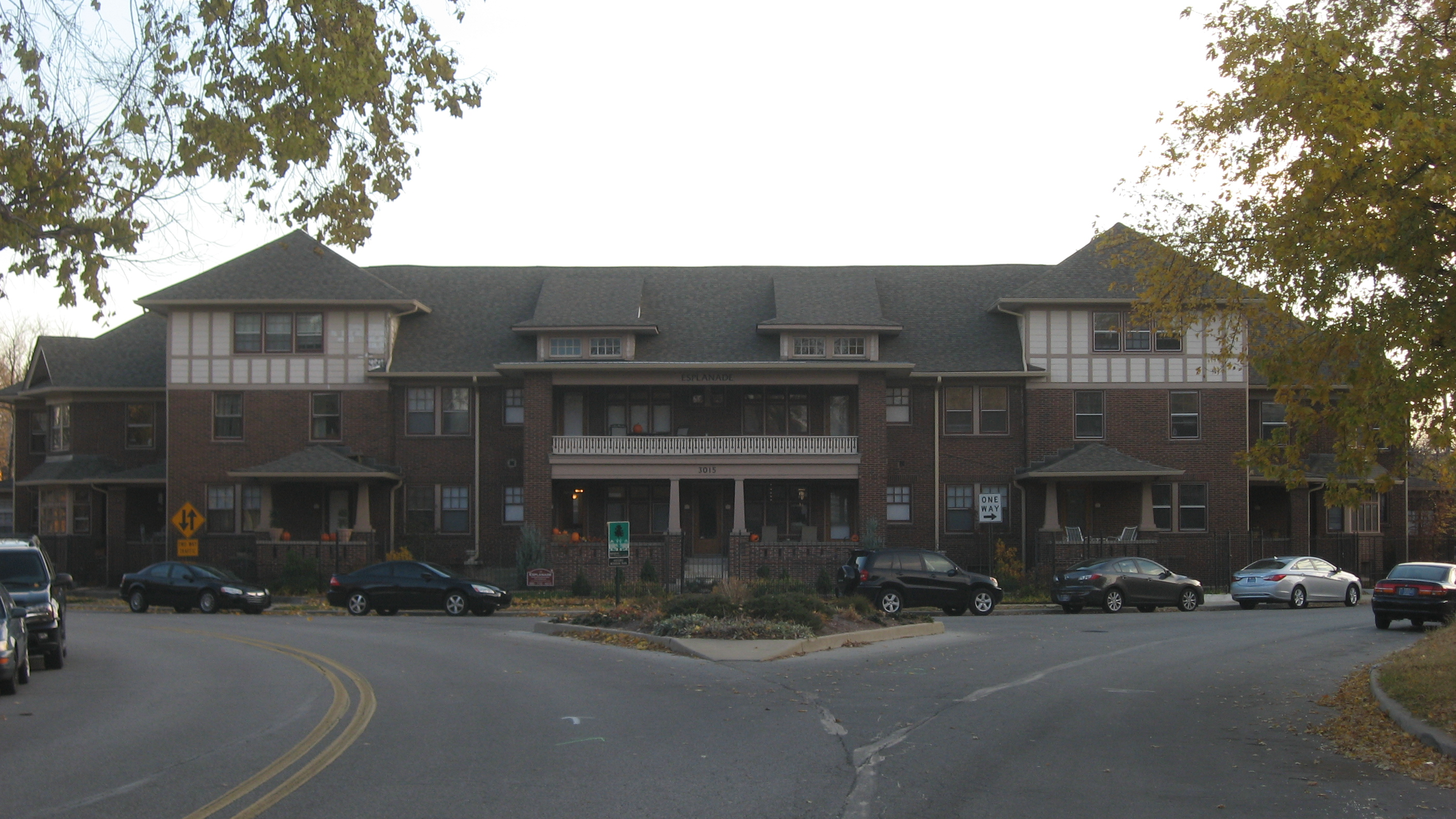
- Esplanade Apartments, November 2010

- Location within Indianapolis Location within Indiana Location within the United States
- Location: 3015 N. Pennsylvania St., Indianapolis, Indiana
- Coordinates: 39°48′39″N 86°9′16″W
- Area: less than one acre
- Built: 1912-1913
- Architectural style: Prairie School, Bungalow/craftsman
- NRHP reference No.: 83000129
- Added to NRHP: June 16, 1983

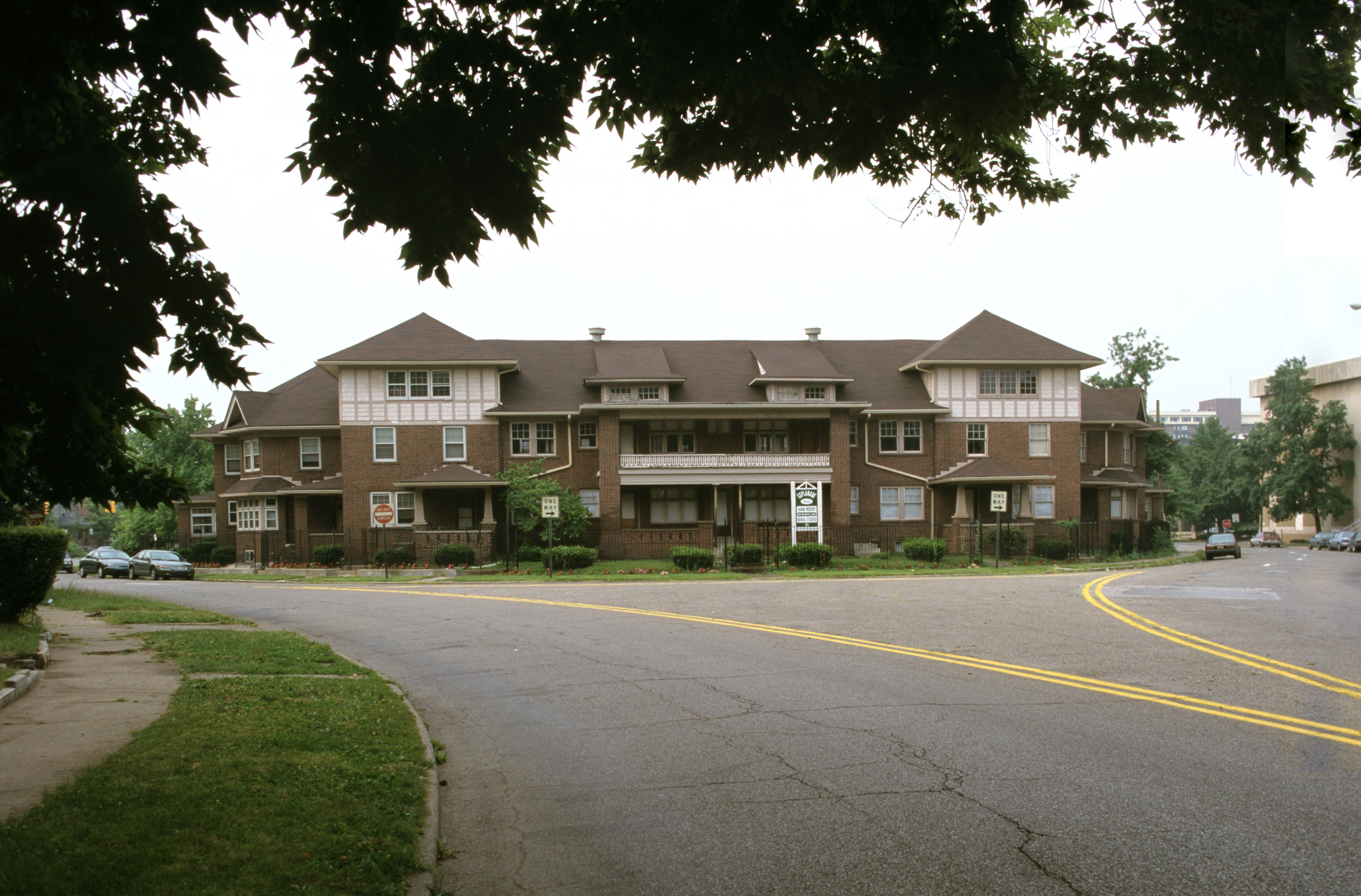
Esplanade Apartments photographed in 1998.

Esplanade Apartments is a historic apartment building located at Indianapolis, Indiana. It was built in 1912 and opened for business with ads in the Indianapolis Star on September 1, 1912, and is a two to three-story, U-shaped, brick veneered building. It has simulated half-timbering and hipped roof with wide overhanging boxed eaves in the Prairie School and Bungalow / American Craftsman style.

It was listed on the National Register of Historic Places in 1983.

== See also ==
- National Register of Historic Places listings in Center Township, Marion County, Indiana
