= Heier's Hotel =

- U.S. National Register of Historic Places
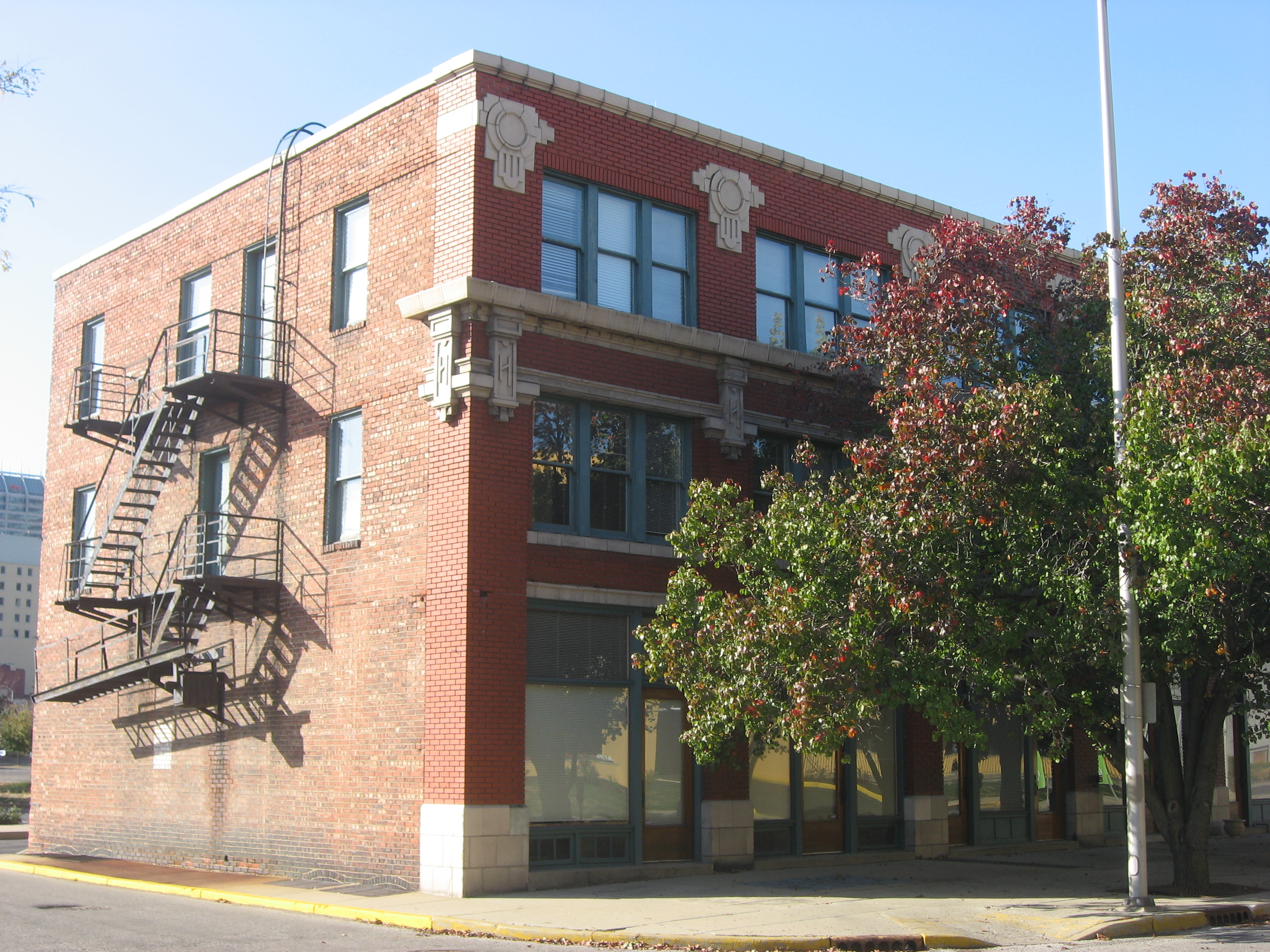
- Heier's Hotel, October 2010

- Location within Indianapolis Location within Indianapolis Location within Indiana Location within the United States
- Location: 10-18 S. New Jersey St., Indianapolis, Indiana
- Coordinates: 39°45′59″N 86°9′3″W
- Area: less than one acre
- Built: 1915-1916
- Built by: Jungclaus, William P.
- Architect: Byfield, Charles H.
- NRHP reference No.: 86002704
- Added to NRHP: September 22, 1986

Heier's Hotel is a historic hotel building located at Indianapolis, Indiana. It was built in 1915–1916, and is a three-story, five-bay, brick building. It features two tall brick piers and terra cotta cornice-like projecting elements. The building houses commercial storefronts on the first floor.

It was listed on the National Register of Historic Places in 1986.

== See also ==
- National Register of Historic Places listings in Center Township, Marion County, Indiana
