= Linwood Colonial Apartments =

- U.S. National Register of Historic Places
- U.S. Historic district
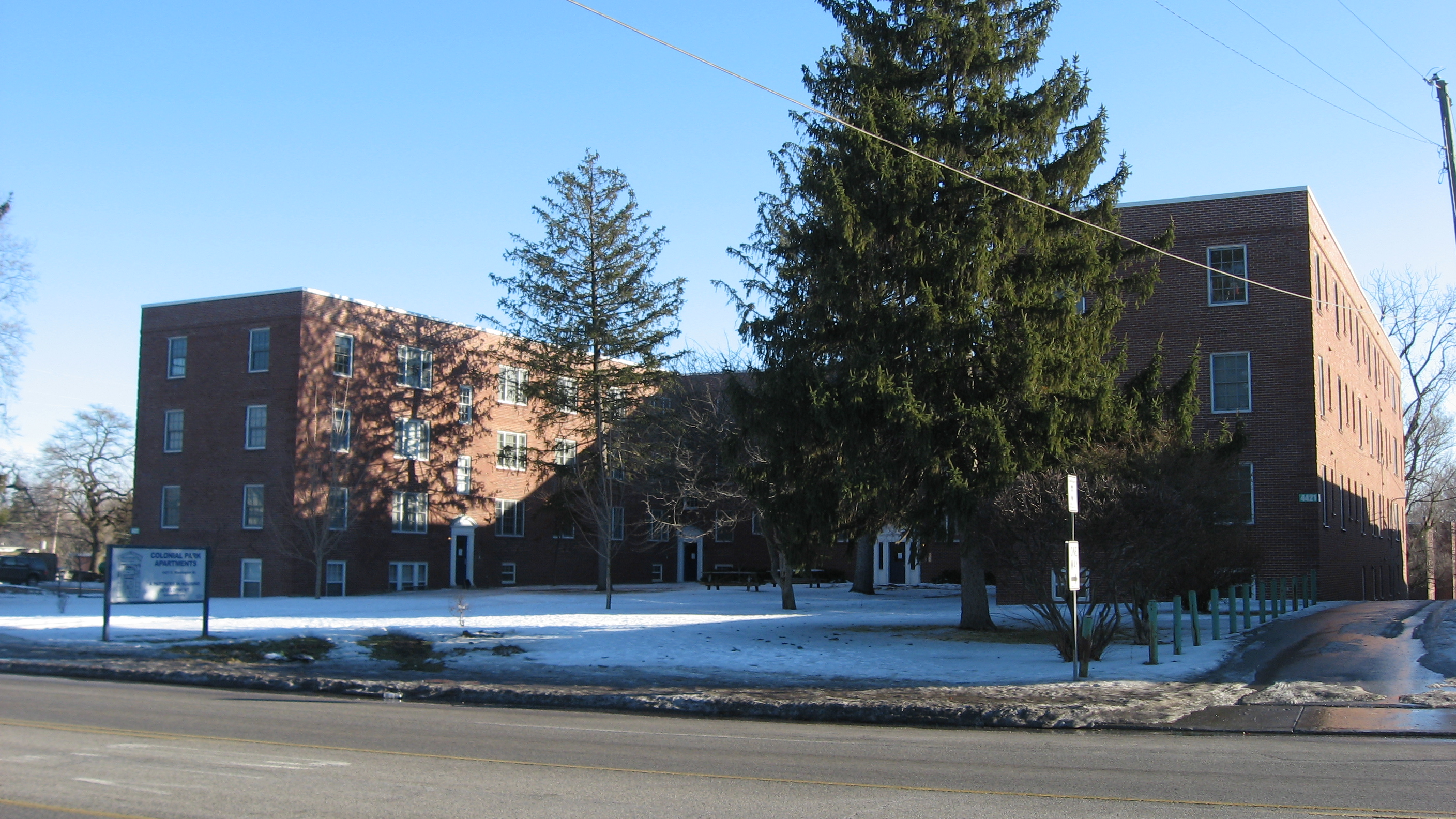
- Linwood Colonial Apartments, February 2011

- Location within Indianapolis Location within Indiana Location within the United States
- Location: 4421 E. Washington St. and 55 and 56 S. Linwood Ave., Indianapolis, Indiana
- Coordinates: 39°46′14″N 86°5′34″W
- Area: 3.6 acres (1.5 ha)
- Built: 1937-1938
- Architect: Pierre & Wright; Moynahan Apartment Organization
- Architectural style: Colonial Revival, garden apartment
- NRHP reference No.: 06000308
- Added to NRHP: April 19, 2006

Linwood Colonial Apartments, also known as Colonial Park Apartments, is a historic garden apartment complex and national historic district located at Indianapolis, Indiana. It was built in 1937–1938, and consists of three three-story, Colonial Revival style red brick buildings. It has 106 apartments and includes a U-shaped building and two stepped plan buildings.

It was listed on the National Register of Historic Places in 2006.

== See also ==
- National Register of Historic Places listings in Center Township, Marion County, Indiana
