= George Philip Meier House =

Historic house in Indiana, United States

- U.S. National Register of Historic Places
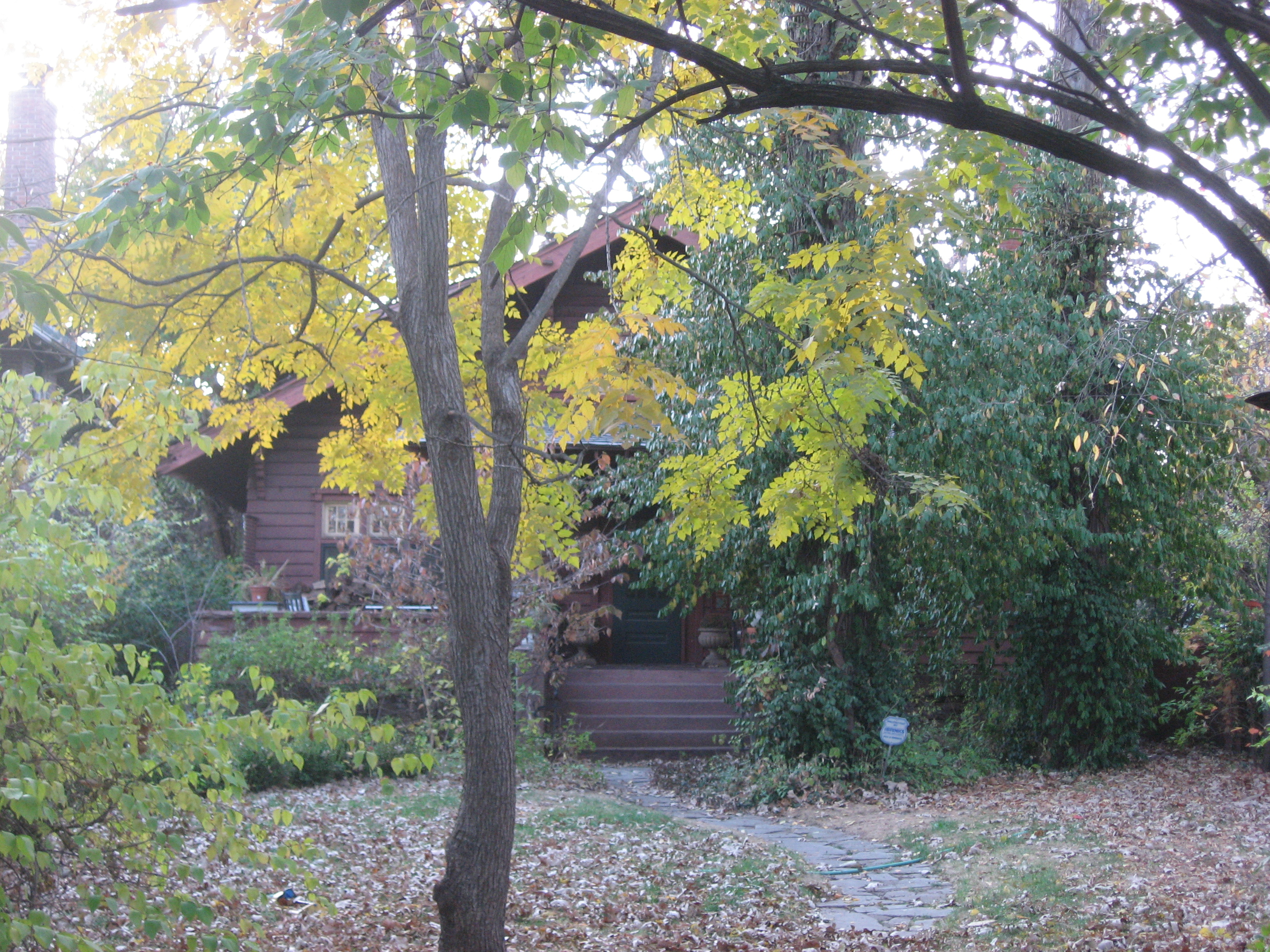
- George Philip Meier House, November 2010

- Location within Indianapolis Location within Indiana Location within the United States
- Location: 3128 N. Pennsylvania St., Indianapolis, Indiana
- Coordinates: 39°48′46″N 86°9′18″W
- Area: less than one acre
- Built: 1907, 1912
- Architect: Bakemier, Frank C.
- Architectural style: Bungalow/craftsman
- NRHP reference No.: 82000065
- Added to NRHP: September 23, 1982

George Philip Meier House, also known as Tuckaway, is a historic home located at Indianapolis, Indiana. It was built in 1907, and is a two-story, Bungalow / American Craftsman style frame dwelling clad in cedar clapboard. The second story was added in 1912. It has a front gable roof and features a full-width front porch and scrolled brackets on the overhanging eaves.

It was listed on the National Register of Historic Places in 1982.

== See also ==
- National Register of Historic Places listings in Center Township, Marion County, Indiana
