= Gaseteria, Inc. =

- U.S. National Register of Historic Places
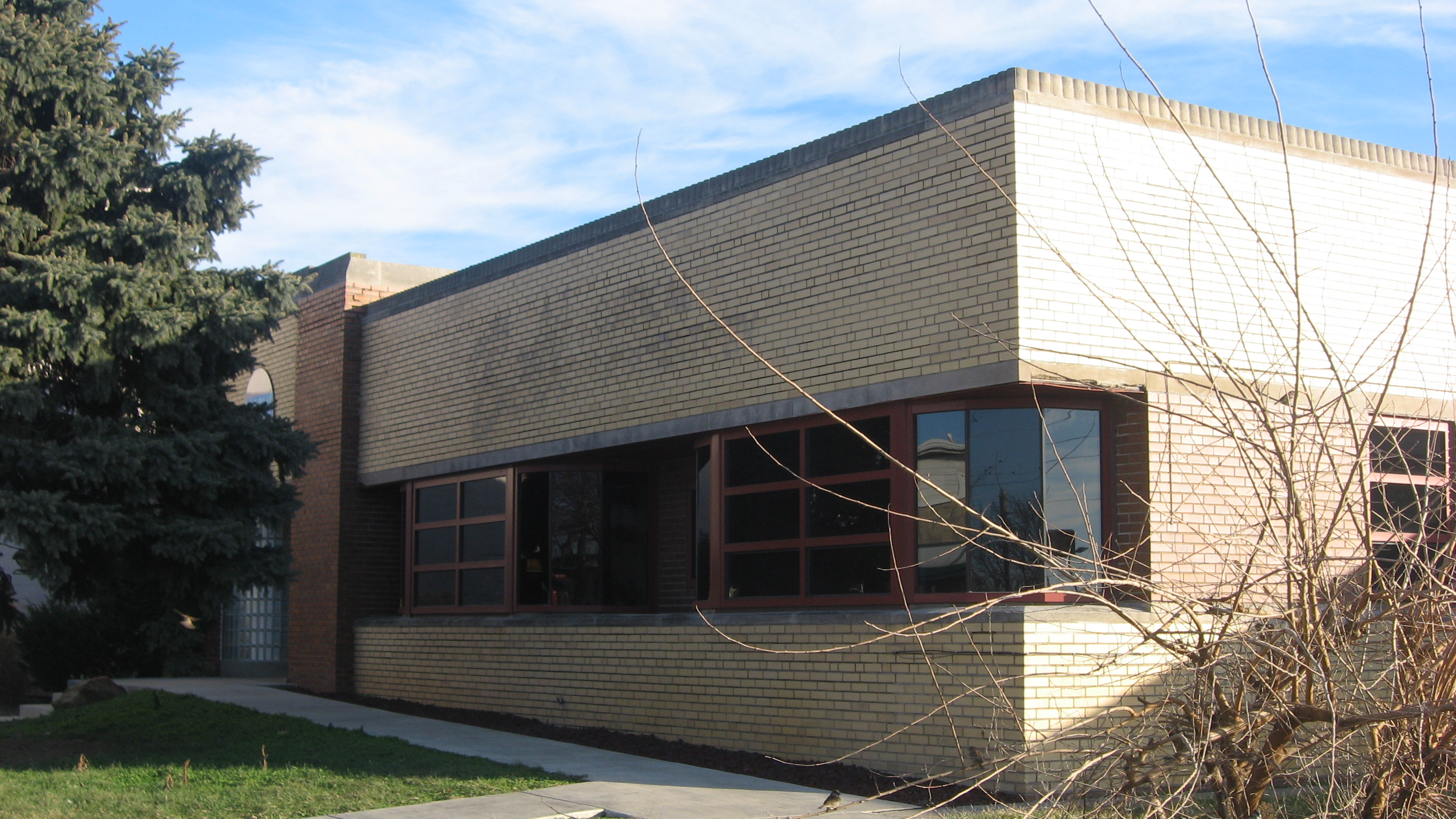
- Gaseteria, Inc., November 2010

- Location within Indianapolis Location within Indiana Location within the United States
- Location: 1031 E. Washington St., Indianapolis, Indiana
- Coordinates: 39°46′00″N 86°08′23″W
- Area: Less than 1 acre (0.40 ha)
- Built: 1941
- Built by: Williams, Russel S.
- Architectural style: Art Moderne
- NRHP reference No.: 13000089
- Added to NRHP: March 13, 2013

Gaseteria, Inc., also known as ACLU, Indiana, is a historic apartment building located at Indianapolis, Indiana. It was built in 1941, and is a one-story, Art-Moderne-style, buff-color and red brick building with limestone detailing and a flat roof. It features curved walls and glass-block windows. It was built to house the offices of the Gaseteria filling station company.

It was listed on the National Register of Historic Places in 2013.

== See also ==
- National Register of Historic Places listings in Center Township, Marion County, Indiana
