= The Cathcart =

- Cathcart
- U.S. National Register of Historic Places
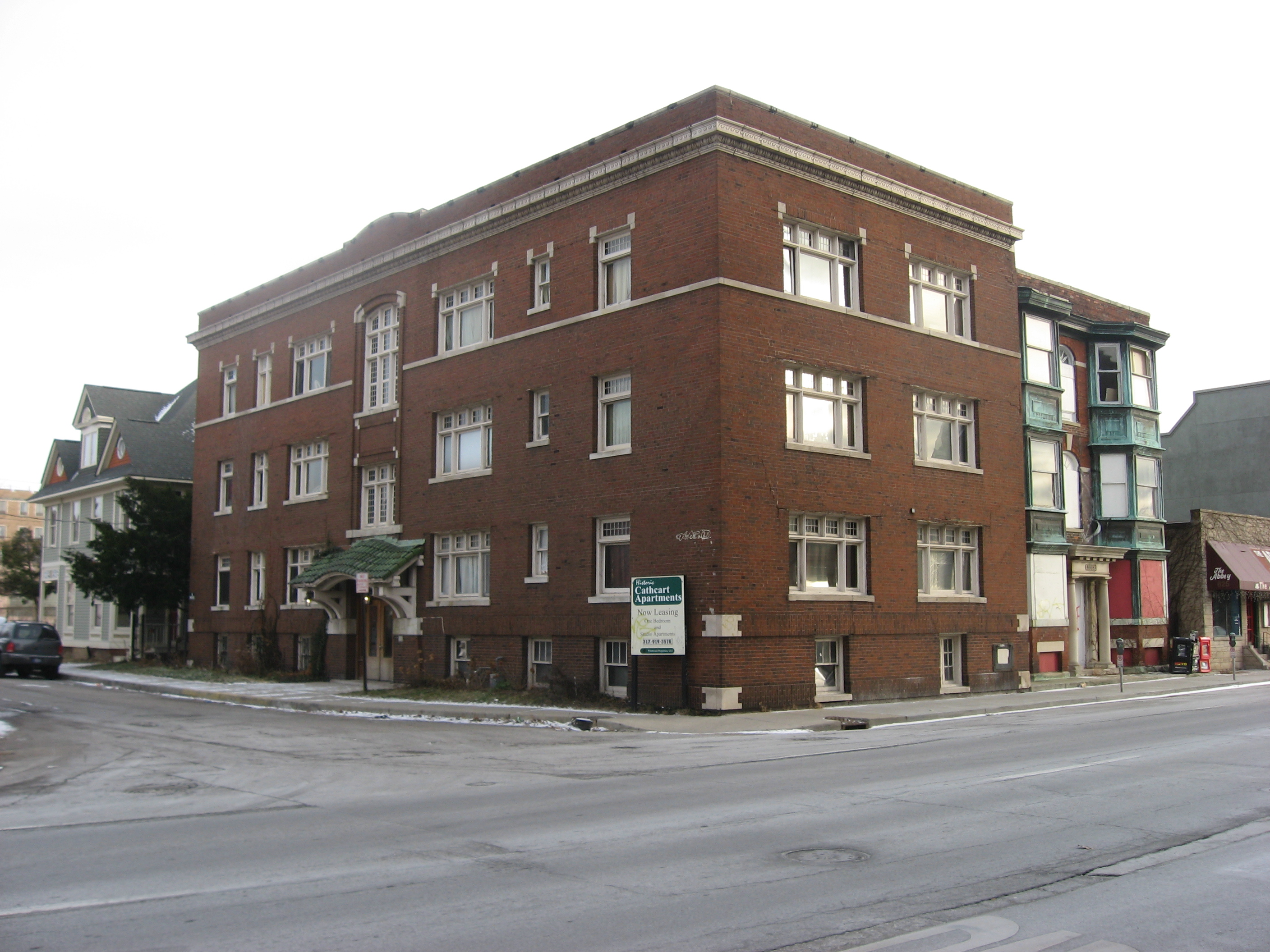
- Exterior of The Cathcart

- Location within Indianapolis Location within Indianapolis Location within Indiana Location within the United States
- Location: 103 E. 9th St.Indianapolis, Indiana
- Coordinates: 39°46′44″N 86°9′20″W
- Area: less than one acre
- Built: 1909
- Architect: Joel T. Elliott
- MPS: Apartments and Flats of Downtown Indianapolis TR
- NRHP reference No.: 83000060
- Added to NRHP: September 15, 1983

The Cathcart is a historic apartment building located at 103 E. 9th St. in Indianapolis, Indiana, United States. It was built in 1909 amid an apartment-building boom in what is now central Indianapolis.

Its NRHP nomination states: "The Cathcart is an architecturally outstanding example of the "Eastern" flat type apartment that was a significant part of the commercial/real estate development of Indianapolis." It is built of deep red brick and grey limestone and has detailing "reminiscent of the Arts and Crafts or Craftsman style."

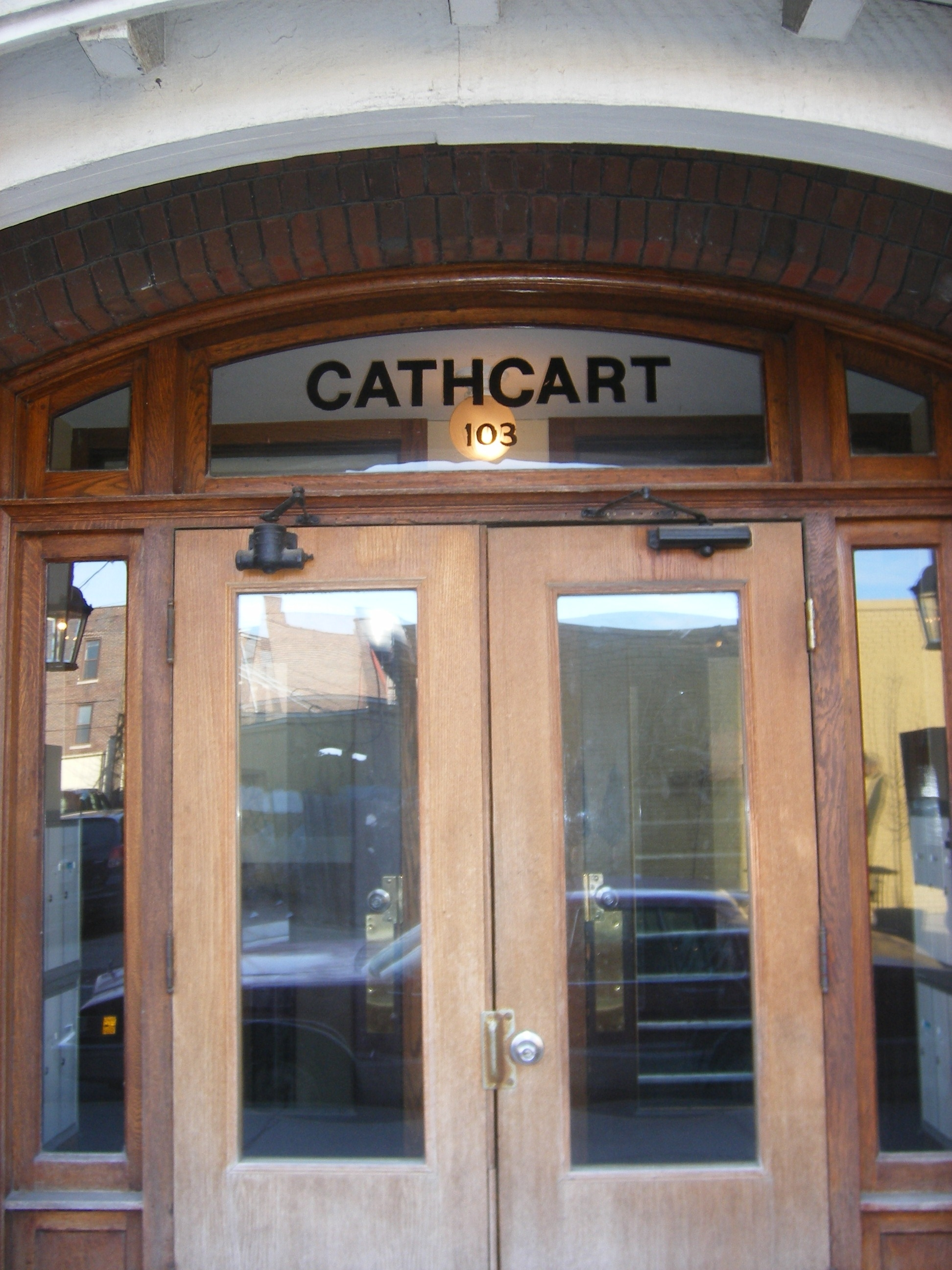
Front doorway detail

The site of the building was the location of a cottage which had been given as a wedding present to Robert Weir Cathcart and Alice Morrison Cathcart in 1870, and was their family home. In 1909, recently widowed, Mrs. Cathcart undertook to have the apartment building constructed "despite the warnings of all advisors."

In 1983, the Cathcart was listed on the National Register of Historic Places as part of the "Apartments and Flats of Downtown Indianapolis" multiple property submission. The apartments in this group were added to the Register for their architecture and for their place in the development of commerce and real estate development in Indianapolis.

== See also ==
- Apartments and Flats of Downtown Indianapolis Thematic Resources
- National Register of Historic Places listings in Center Township, Marion County, Indiana
