= The Myrtle Fern =

- Myrtle Fern
- U.S. National Register of Historic Places
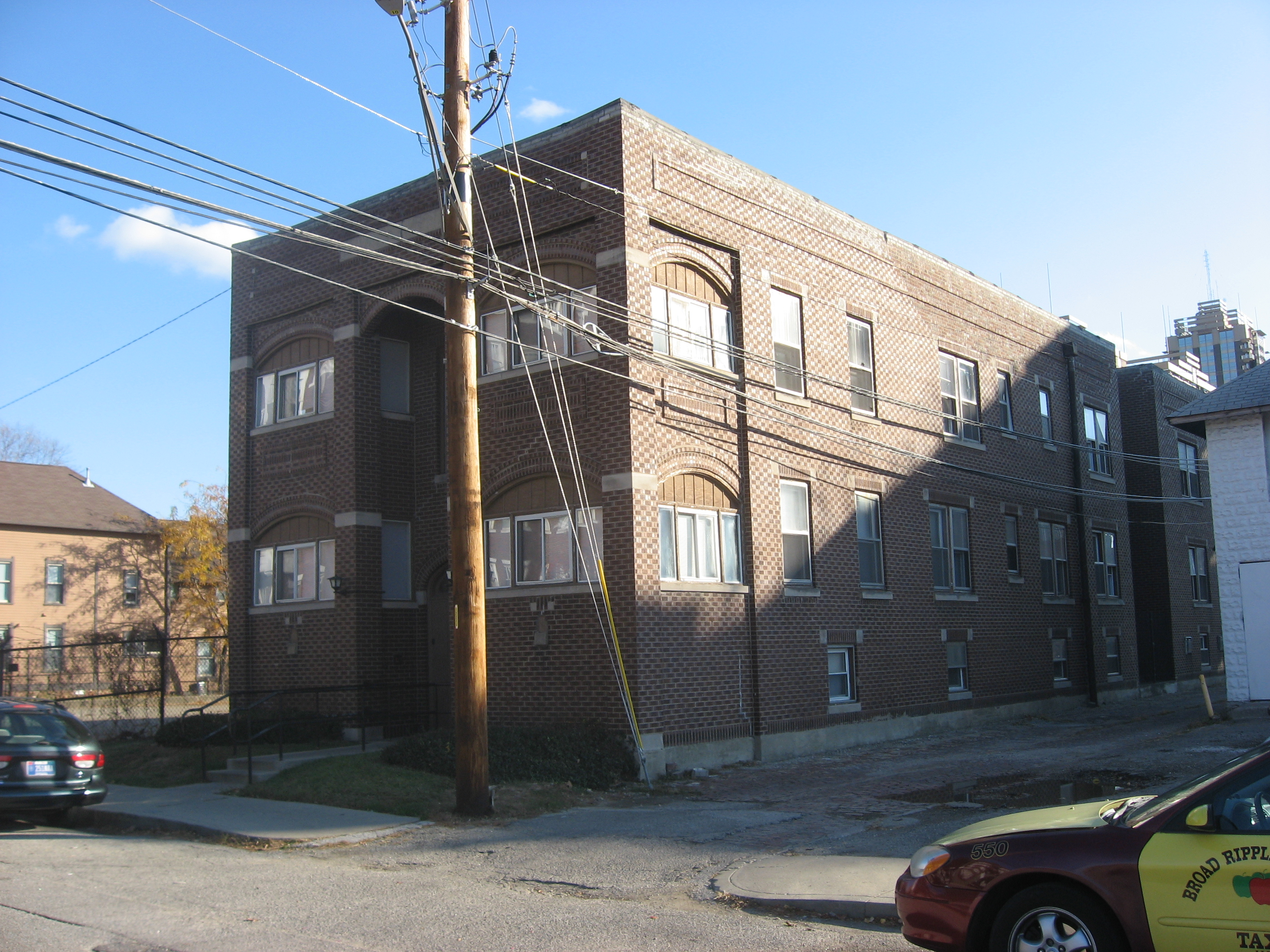
- The Myrtle Fern, November 2010

- Location within Indianapolis Location within Indianapolis Location within Indiana Location within the United States
- Location: 221 E. 9th St., Indianapolis, Indiana
- Coordinates: 39°46′44″N 86°9′11″W
- Area: less than one acre
- Built: 1925
- MPS: Apartments and Flats of Downtown Indianapolis TR
- NRHP reference No.: 83000080
- Added to NRHP: September 15, 1983

The Myrtle Fern is a historic apartment building located at Indianapolis, Indiana. It was built in 1925, and is a two-story, three-bay-by-eleven-bay, center-scored, salt-glazed brown brick building on a raised basement. It recessed central entrance bay and segmental arched openings.

It was listed on the National Register of Historic Places in 1983.

== See also ==
- Apartments and Flats of Downtown Indianapolis Thematic Resources
- National Register of Historic Places listings in Center Township, Marion County, Indiana
