= The Glencoe (Indianapolis, Indiana) =

- Glencoe
- U.S. National Register of Historic Places
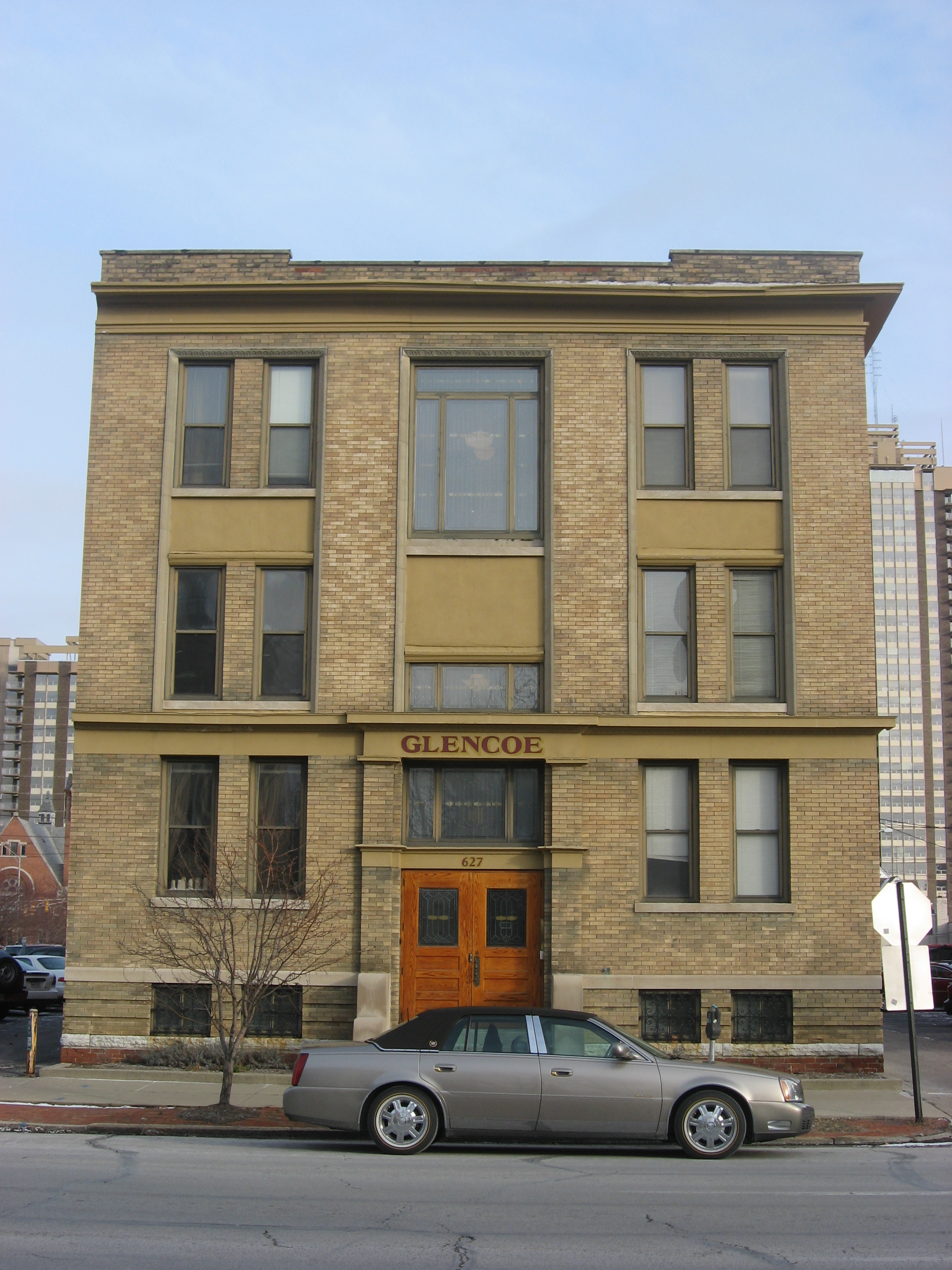
- The Glencoe, January 2010

- Location within Indianapolis Location within Indianapolis Location within Indiana Location within the United States
- Location: 627 N. Pennsylvania St., Indianapolis, Indiana
- Coordinates: 39°46′35″N 86°9′20″W
- Area: less than one acre
- Built: 1902
- Architect: Cooper, Eugene A.
- Architectural style: Classical Revival
- MPS: Apartments and Flats of Downtown Indianapolis TR
- NRHP reference No.: 83000069
- Added to NRHP: September 15, 1983

The Glencoe is a historic apartment building located at Indianapolis, Indiana. It was built in 1902, and is a three-story, simplified Classical Revival style yellow brick building. It has a metal cornice, limestone detailing, and a brick parapet.

It was listed on the National Register of Historic Places in 1983.

== See also ==
- Apartments and Flats of Downtown Indianapolis Thematic Resources
- National Register of Historic Places listings in Center Township, Marion County, Indiana
