= The Massachusetts =

- Massachusetts
- U.S. National Register of Historic Places
- U.S. Historic district – Contributing property
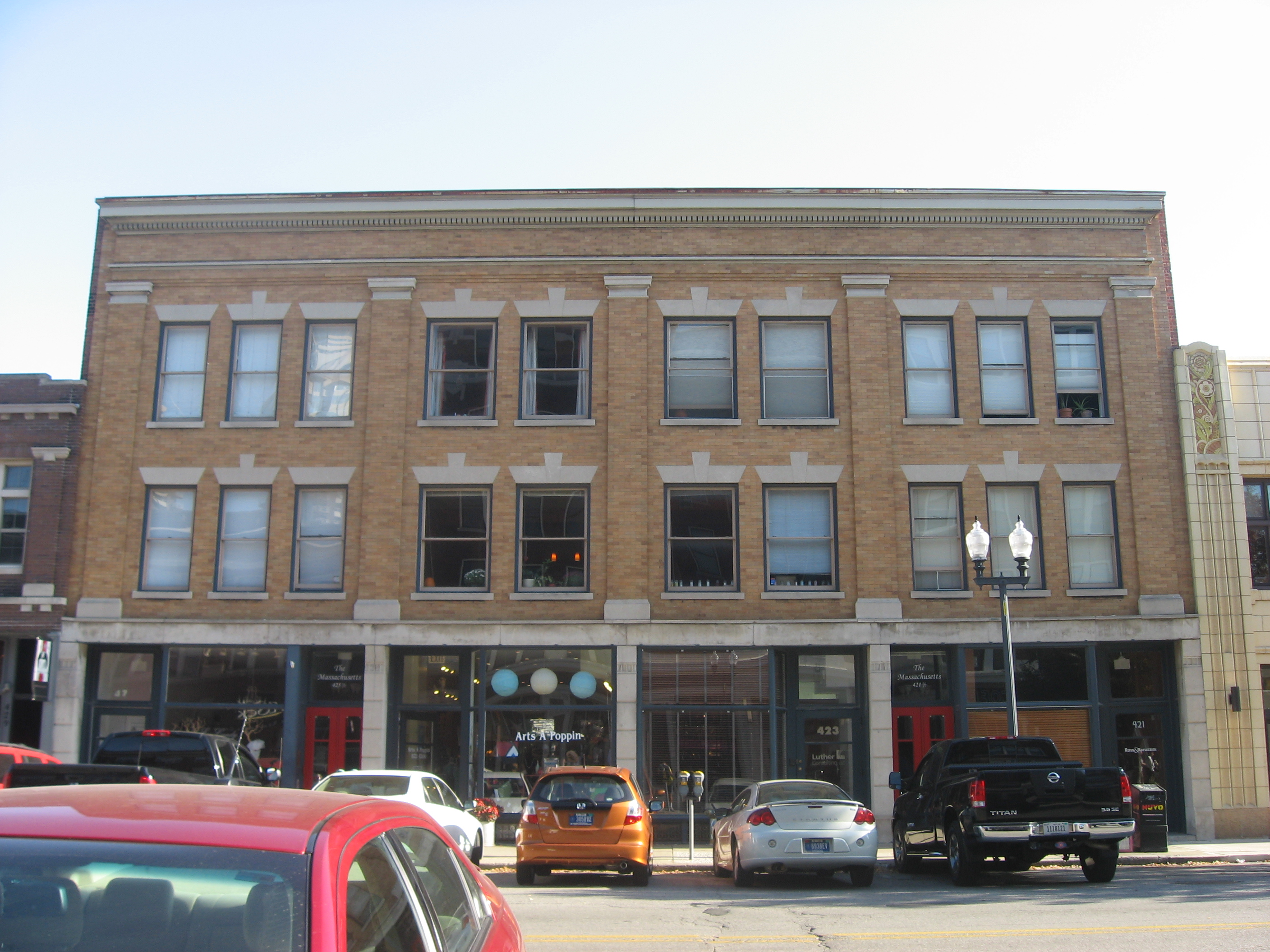
- The Massachusetts, October 2010

- Location within Indianapolis Location within Indiana Location within the United States
- Location: 421-427 Massachusetts Ave., Indianapolis, Indiana
- Coordinates: 39°46′24″N 86°9′3″W
- Area: less than one acre
- Built: 1905
- MPS: Apartments and Flats of Downtown Indianapolis TR
- NRHP reference No.: 83000071
- Added to NRHP: September 15, 1983

The Massachusetts is a historic apartment building located at Indianapolis, Indiana. It was built in 1905, and is a three-story, yellow brick and limestone building. The first floor has commercial storefronts and the two upper stories have four plain Tuscan order pilasters.

It was listed on the National Register of Historic Places in 1983. It is located in the Massachusetts Avenue Commercial District.

== See also ==
- Apartments and Flats of Downtown Indianapolis Thematic Resources
- National Register of Historic Places listings in Center Township, Marion County, Indiana
