= The Dartmouth (Indianapolis) =

- Dartmouth
- U.S. National Register of Historic Places
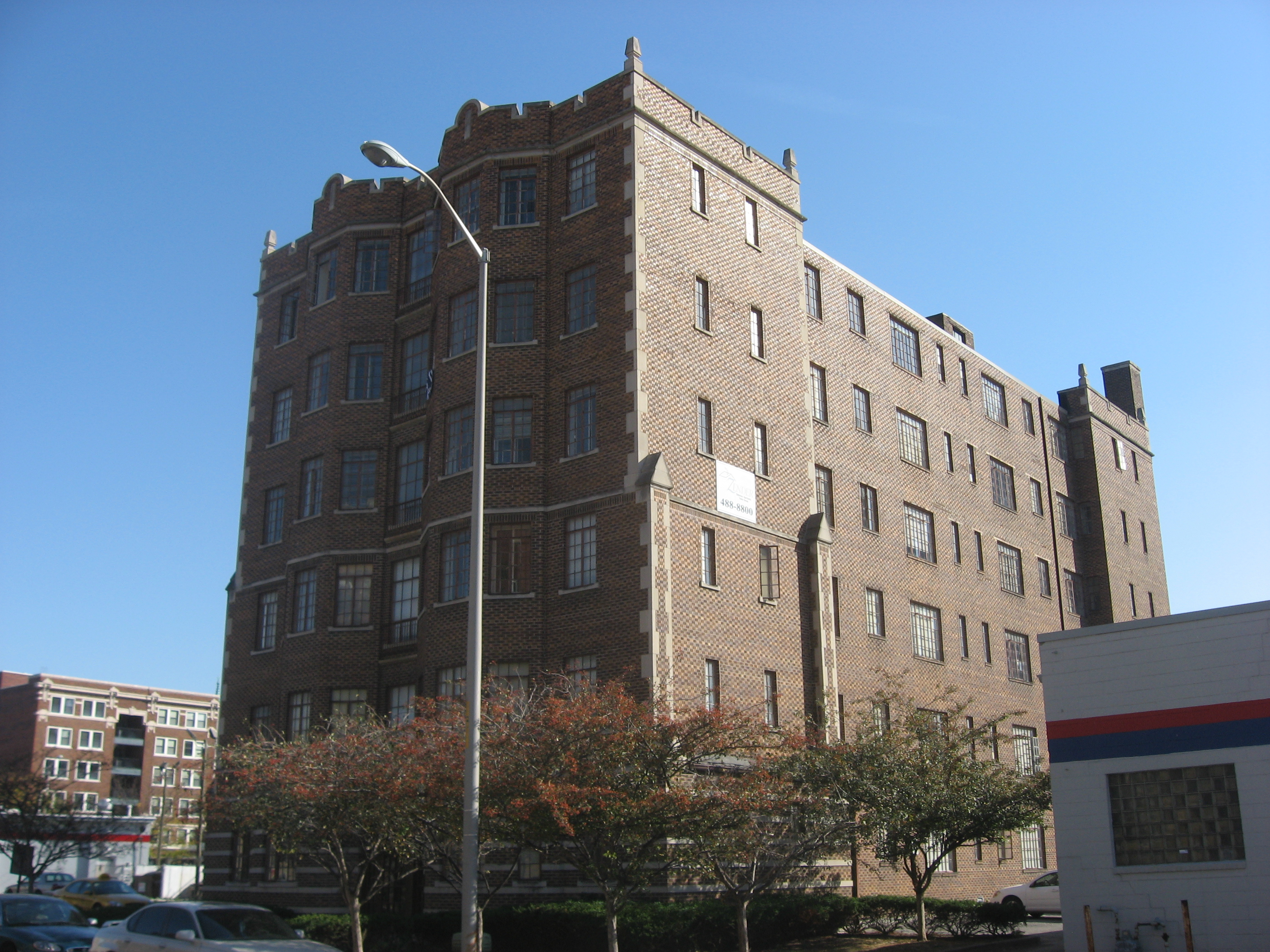
- Front and side of the Dartmouth

- Location within Indianapolis Location within Indianapolis Location within Indiana Location within the United States
- Location: 221 E. Michigan St., Indianapolis, Indiana
- Coordinates: 39°46′29″N 86°9′12″W
- Area: less than one acre
- Built: 1890
- MPS: Apartments and Flats of Downtown Indianapolis TR
- NRHP reference No.: 83000064
- Added to NRHP: September 15, 1983

The Dartmouth is a historic apartment building in Indianapolis, Indiana. It was built in 1890 and is a large six-story, nine-bay-by-twelve-bay building faced in two shades of center-scored, salt-glazed brown brick. It features two three-sided projecting bays, limestone accents, and a crenelated parapet.

It was listed on the National Register of Historic Places in 1983.

== See also ==
- Apartments and Flats of Downtown Indianapolis Thematic Resources
- National Register of Historic Places listings in Center Township, Marion County, Indiana
