= The Rink (Indianapolis) =

Historic building in Indianapolis, Indiana, U.S.

- Rink
- U.S. National Register of Historic Places
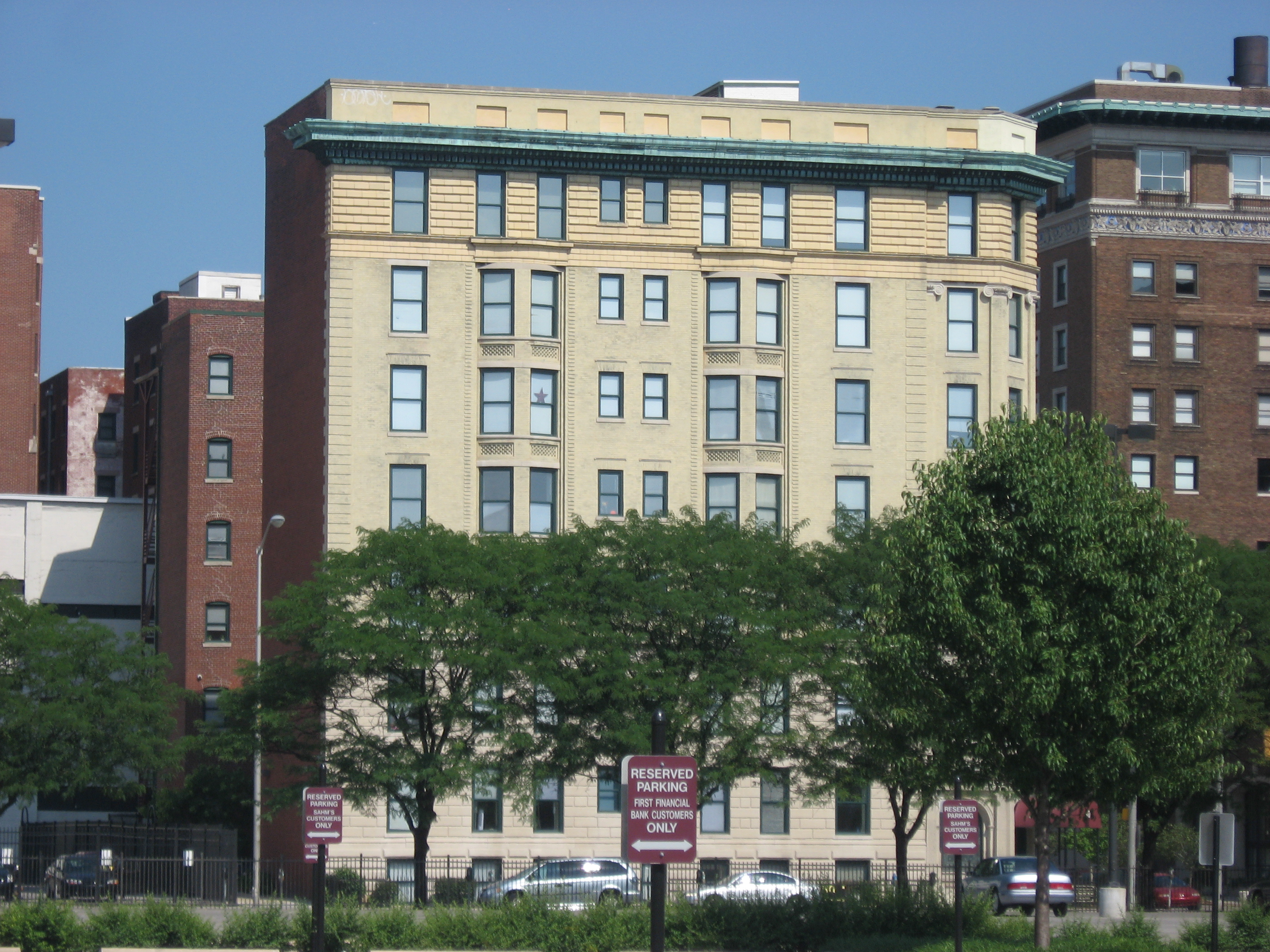
- The Rink, July 2011

- Location within Indiana Location within the United States
- Location: 401 N. Illinois St., Indianapolis, Indiana, U.S.
- Coordinates: 39°46′22″N 86°9′34″W
- Area: less than one acre
- Built: 1901
- Architectural style: Renaissance
- MPS: Apartments and Flats of Downtown Indianapolis TR
- NRHP reference No.: 83000075
- Added to NRHP: September 15, 1983

The Rink also known as The Link, is a historic apartment building located at Indianapolis, Indiana, United States. It was built in 1901, and is a seven-story, six bay by six bay, Renaissance Revival style brick and terra cotta building on a raised basement. The main entrance corner features fluted Ionic order pilasters that extend from the third to the sixth story.

It was listed on the National Register of Historic Places in 1983.

== See also ==
- Apartments and Flats of Downtown Indianapolis Thematic Resources
- National Register of Historic Places listings in Center Township, Marion County, Indiana
