= The Plaza (Indianapolis, Indiana) =

- Plaza
- U.S. National Register of Historic Places
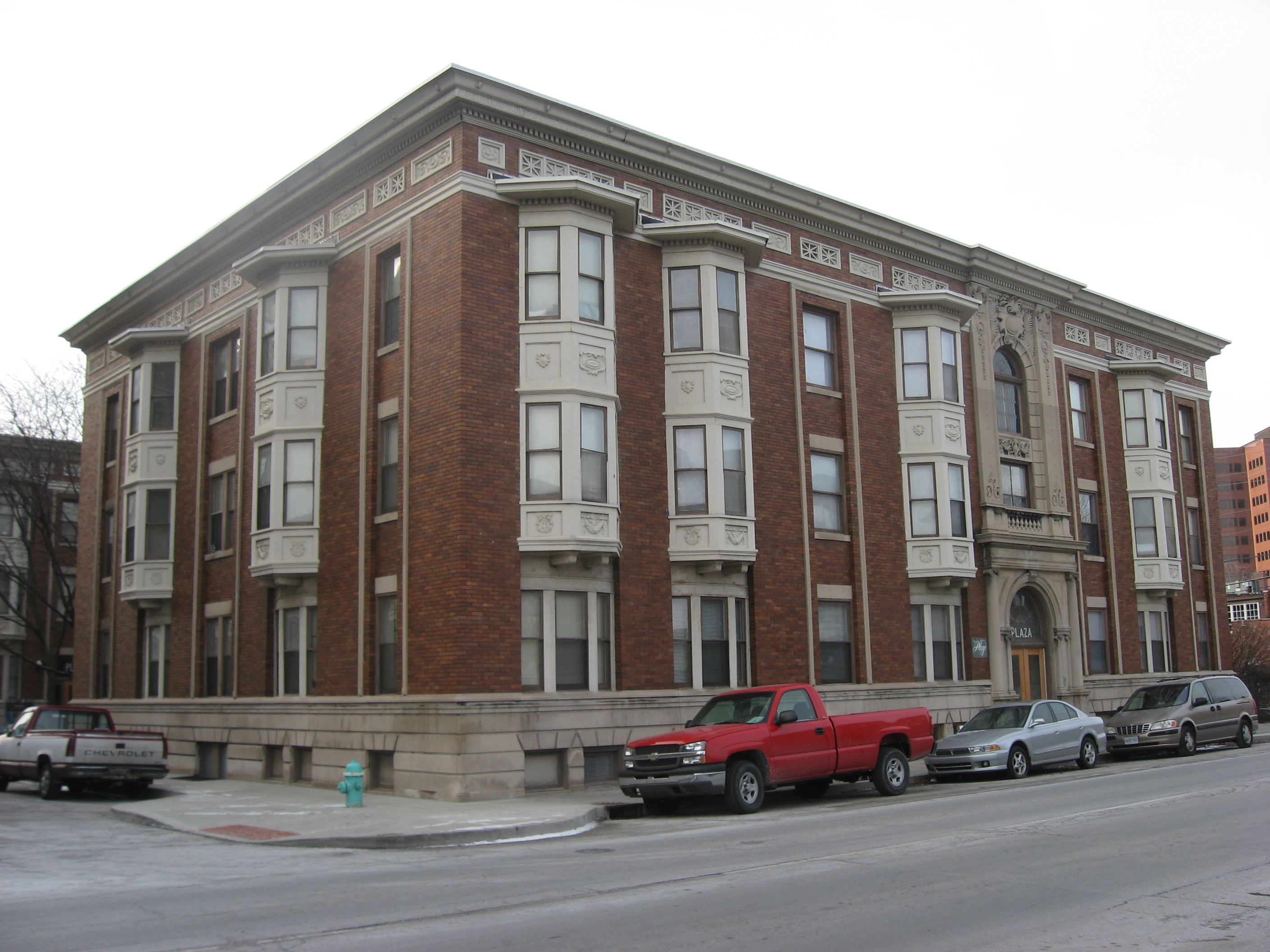
- The Plaza, January 2010

- Location within Indianapolis Location within Indiana Location within the United States
- Location: 902 N. Pennsylvania St. and 36 E. 9th St., Indianapolis, Indiana
- Coordinates: 39°46′45″N 86°9′21″W
- Area: less than one acre
- Built: 1907
- Built by: Pierson & Son
- Architectural style: Renaissance
- MPS: Apartments and Flats of Downtown Indianapolis TR
- NRHP reference No.: 83000083
- Added to NRHP: September 15, 1983

The Plaza is a historic apartment building located at Indianapolis, Indiana. It was built in 1907, and is a three-story, U-shaped, glazed orange brick and grey limestone building. It features a full facade Renaissance Revival style entrance with Ionic order columns and polygonal bay windows on the upper stories.

It was listed on the National Register of Historic Places in 1983.

== See also ==
- Apartments and Flats of Downtown Indianapolis Thematic Resources
- National Register of Historic Places listings in Center Township, Marion County, Indiana
