= The Shelton =

- Shelton
- U.S. National Register of Historic Places
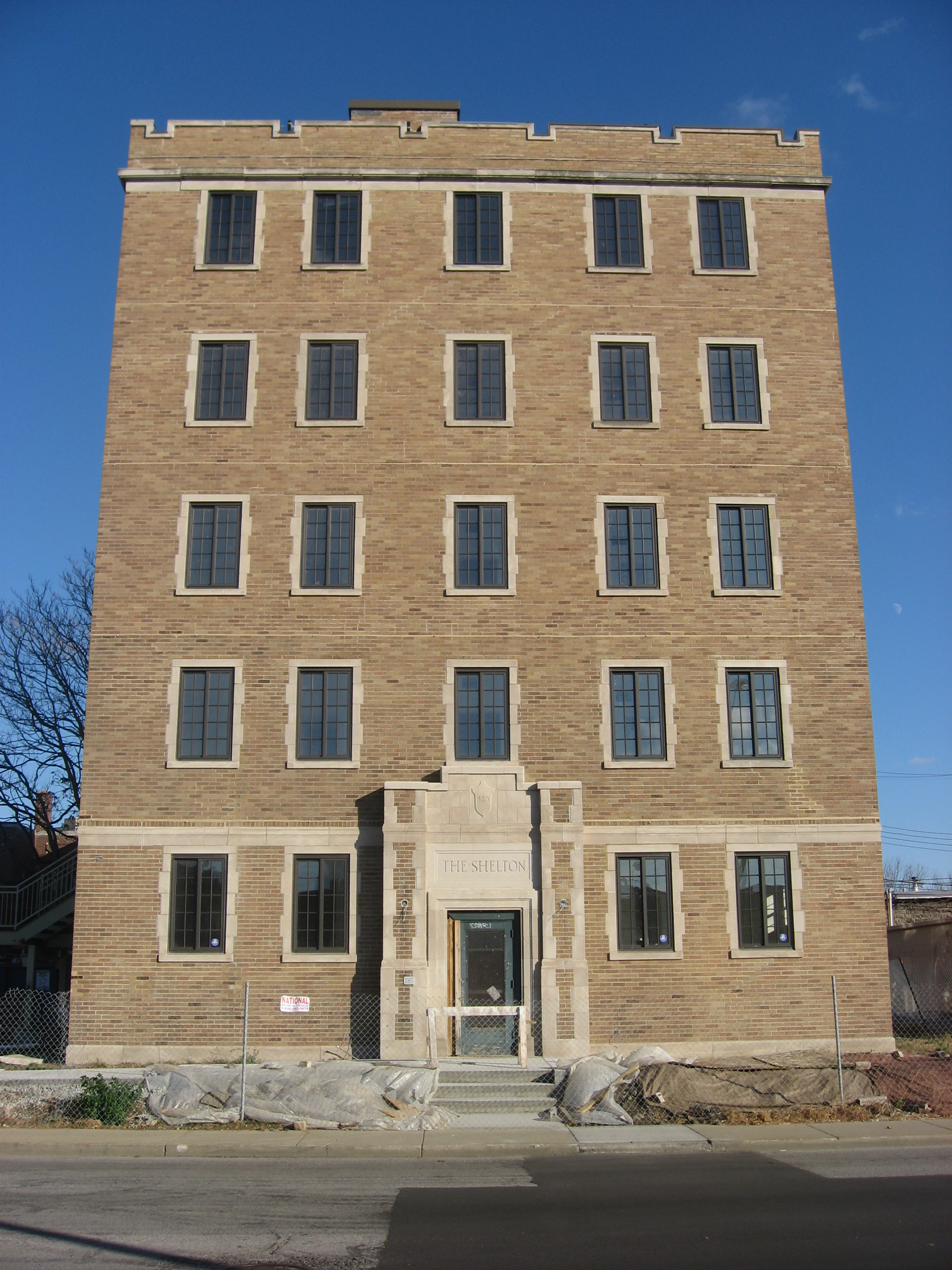
- The Shelton, November 2010

- Location within Indianapolis Location within Indiana Location within the United States
- Location: 825 N. Delaware St., Indianapolis, Indiana
- Coordinates: 39°46′42″N 86°9′13″W
- Area: less than one acre
- Built: 1925
- Architect: Foster Engineering Co.
- MPS: Apartments and Flats of Downtown Indianapolis TR
- NRHP reference No.: 83000077
- Added to NRHP: September 15, 1983

The Shelton is a historic apartment building located at Indianapolis, Indiana. It was built in 1925, and is a five-story, five-bay, buff color brick building. It features a central projecting entrance bay and dressed limestone trim.

It was listed on the National Register of Historic Places in 1983.

== See also ==
- Apartments and Flats of Downtown Indianapolis Thematic Resources
- National Register of Historic Places listings in Center Township, Marion County, Indiana
