= The Mayleeno =

- Mayleeno
- U.S. National Register of Historic Places
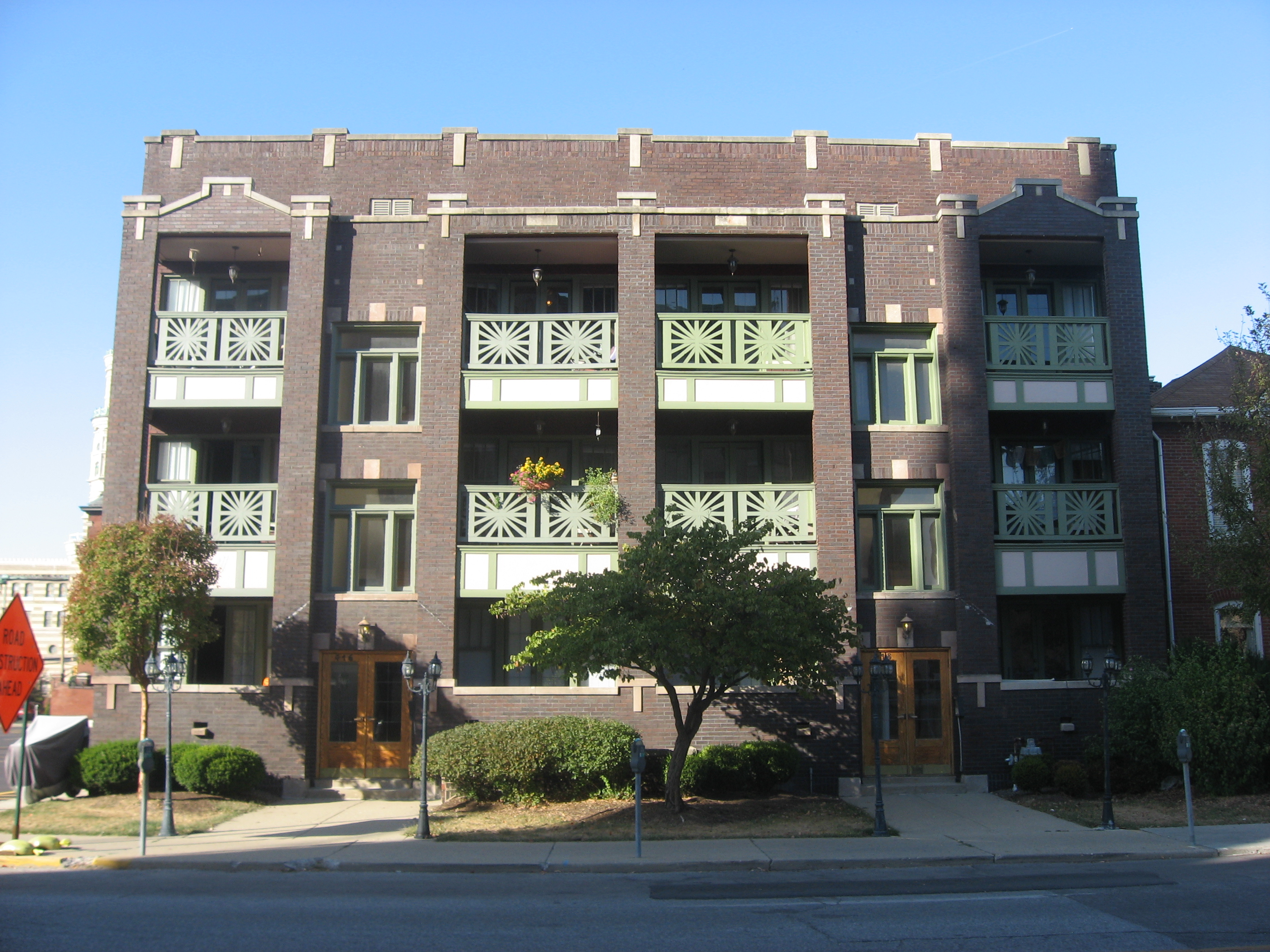
- The Mayleeno, October 2010

- Location within Indianapolis Location within Indianapolis Location within Indiana Location within the United States
- Location: 416-418 E. Vermont St., Indianapolis, Indiana
- Coordinates: 39°46′22″N 86°8′59″W
- Area: less than one acre
- Built: 1914
- Built by: Osbon and Sons
- Architectural style: Arts and Crafts
- MPS: Apartments and Flats of Downtown Indianapolis TR
- NRHP reference No.: 83000072
- Added to NRHP: September 15, 1983

The Mayleeno is a historic apartment building located immediately behind the Athenæum (Das Deutsche Haus) at Indianapolis, Indiana. It was built in 1914, and is a three-story, U-shaped, brick and limestone building reminiscent of the Arts and Crafts movement. It features screened balcony porches on the front of each apartment unit.

It was listed on the National Register of Historic Places in 1983.

== See also ==
- Apartments and Flats of Downtown Indianapolis Thematic Resources
- National Register of Historic Places listings in Center Township, Marion County, Indiana
