= The Sid-Mar =

- Sid-Mar
- U.S. National Register of Historic Places
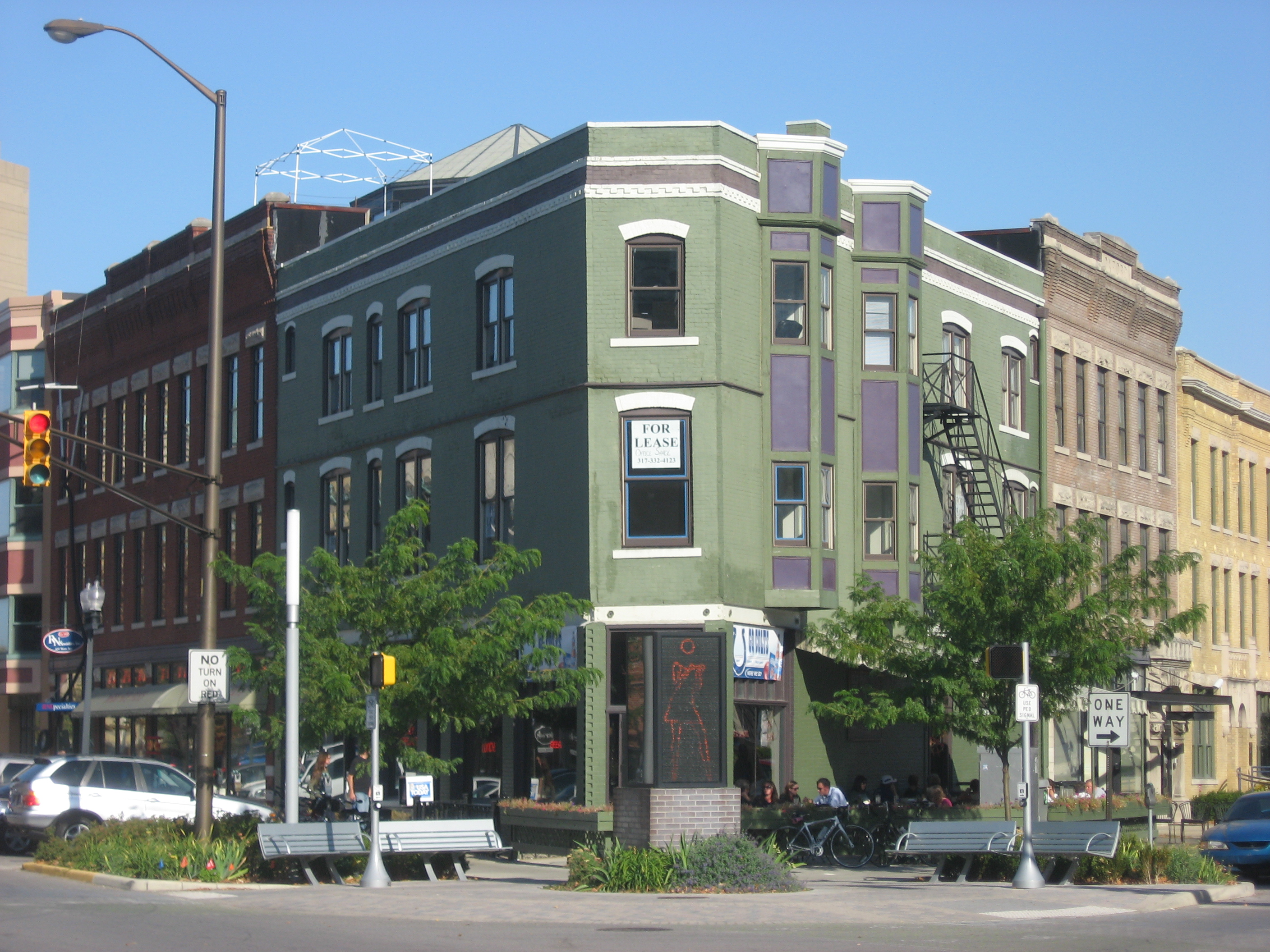
- The Sid-Mar, October 2010

- Location within Indianapolis Location within Indiana Location within the United States
- Location: 401-403 Massachusetts Ave., Indianapolis, Indiana
- Coordinates: 39°46′22″N 86°9′7″W
- Area: less than one acre
- Built: 1887
- Architectural style: Italianate
- MPS: Apartments and Flats of Downtown Indianapolis TR
- NRHP reference No.: 83000079
- Added to NRHP: September 15, 1983

The Sid-Mar is a historic apartment building located at Indianapolis, Indiana. It was built in 1887, and is a three-story, triangular, Italianate style red brick building. It has commercial storefronts on the first floor and segmental arched and projecting bay windows on the upper floors.

It was listed on the National Register of Historic Places in 1983.

== See also ==
- Massachusetts Avenue Commercial District
- Apartments and Flats of Downtown Indianapolis Thematic Resources
- National Register of Historic Places listings in Center Township, Marion County, Indiana
