= The Wil-Fra-Mar =

- Wil-Fra-Mar
- U.S. National Register of Historic Places
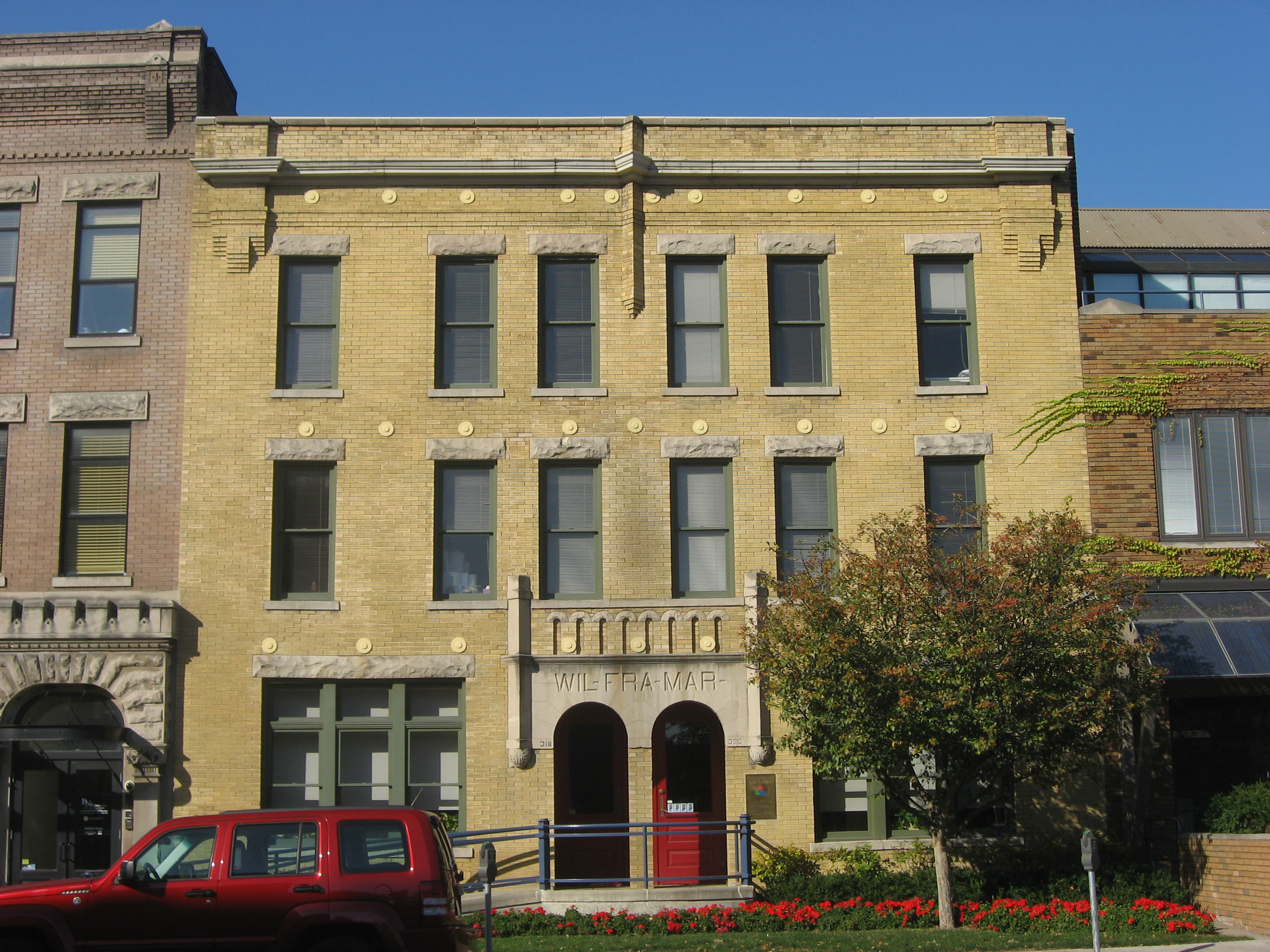
- The Wil-Fra-Mar, October 2010

- Location within Indianapolis Location within Indiana Location within the United States
- Location: 318-320 E. Vermont St., Indianapolis, Indiana
- Coordinates: 39°46′22″N 86°9′5″W
- Area: less than one acre
- Built: 1897
- Architectural style: Romanesque
- MPS: Apartments and Flats of Downtown Indianapolis TR
- NRHP reference No.: 83000088
- Added to NRHP: September 15, 1983

The Wil-Fra-Mar is a historic apartment building located at Indianapolis, Indiana. It was built in 1897, and is a three-story, six bay wide, yellow brick building. It has double recessed entries and stripped down Romanesque Revival style details.

It was listed on the National Register of Historic Places in 1983.

== See also ==
- Massachusetts Avenue Commercial District
- Apartments and Flats of Downtown Indianapolis Thematic Resources
- National Register of Historic Places listings in Center Township, Marion County, Indiana
