= The Wilson (Indianapolis, Indiana) =

- Wilson
- U.S. National Register of Historic Places
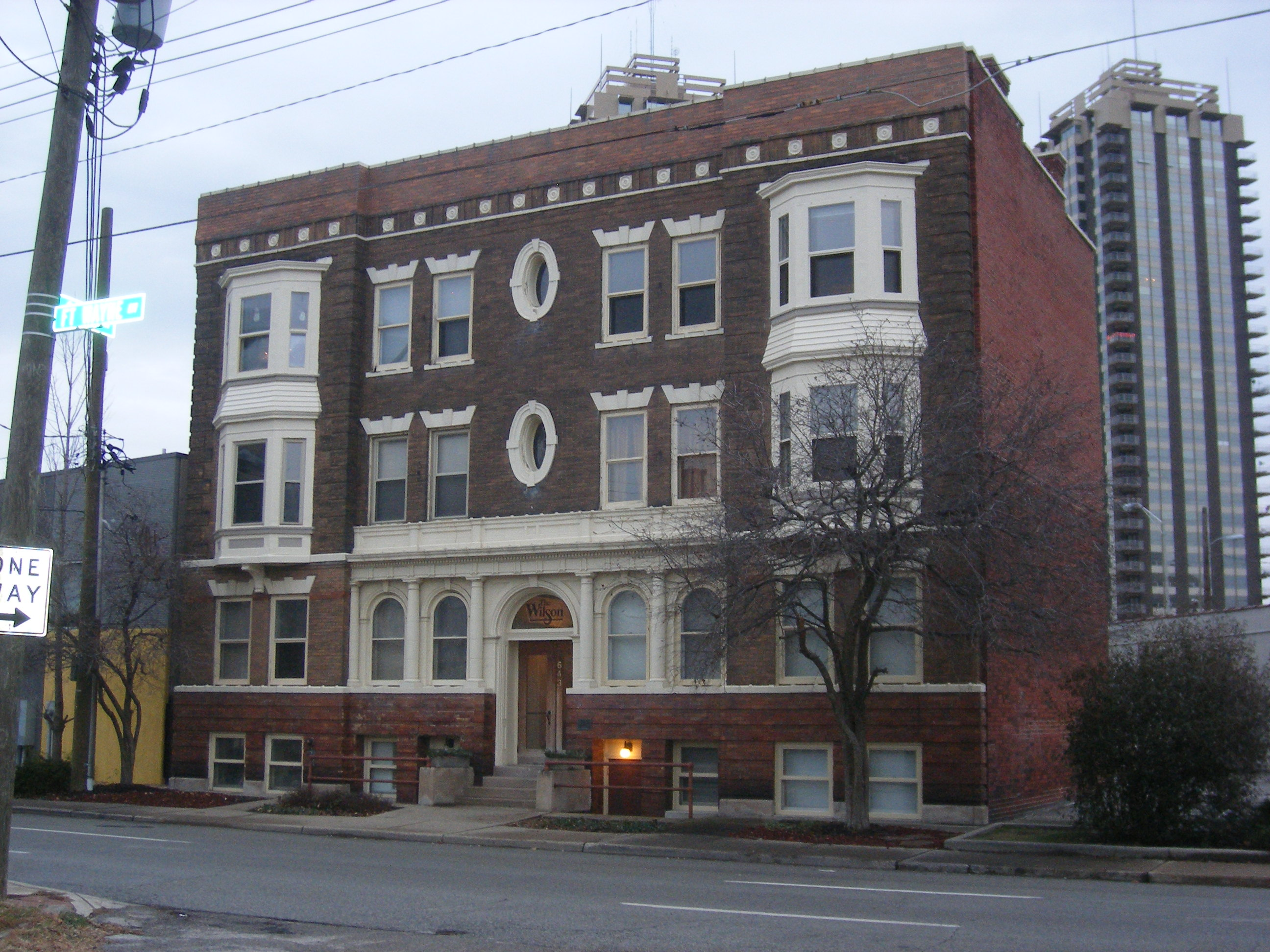
- Front of the Wilson

- Location within Indianapolis Location within Indianapolis Location within Indiana Location within the United States
- Location: 643 Ft. Wayne Ave., Indianapolis, Indiana
- Coordinates: 39°46′34″N 86°9′17″W
- Area: less than one acre
- Built: 1905
- Architectural style: Renaissance Revival
- MPS: Apartments and Flats of Downtown Indianapolis TR
- NRHP reference No.: 83000089
- Added to NRHP: September 15, 1983

The Wilson is a historic Renaissance Revival apartment building located at 643 Fort Wayne Avenue in Indianapolis, Indiana, United States. It was built in 1905 amid an apartment-building boom; more than fifty such apartment buildings were completed in what is now central Indianapolis in 1905 alone.

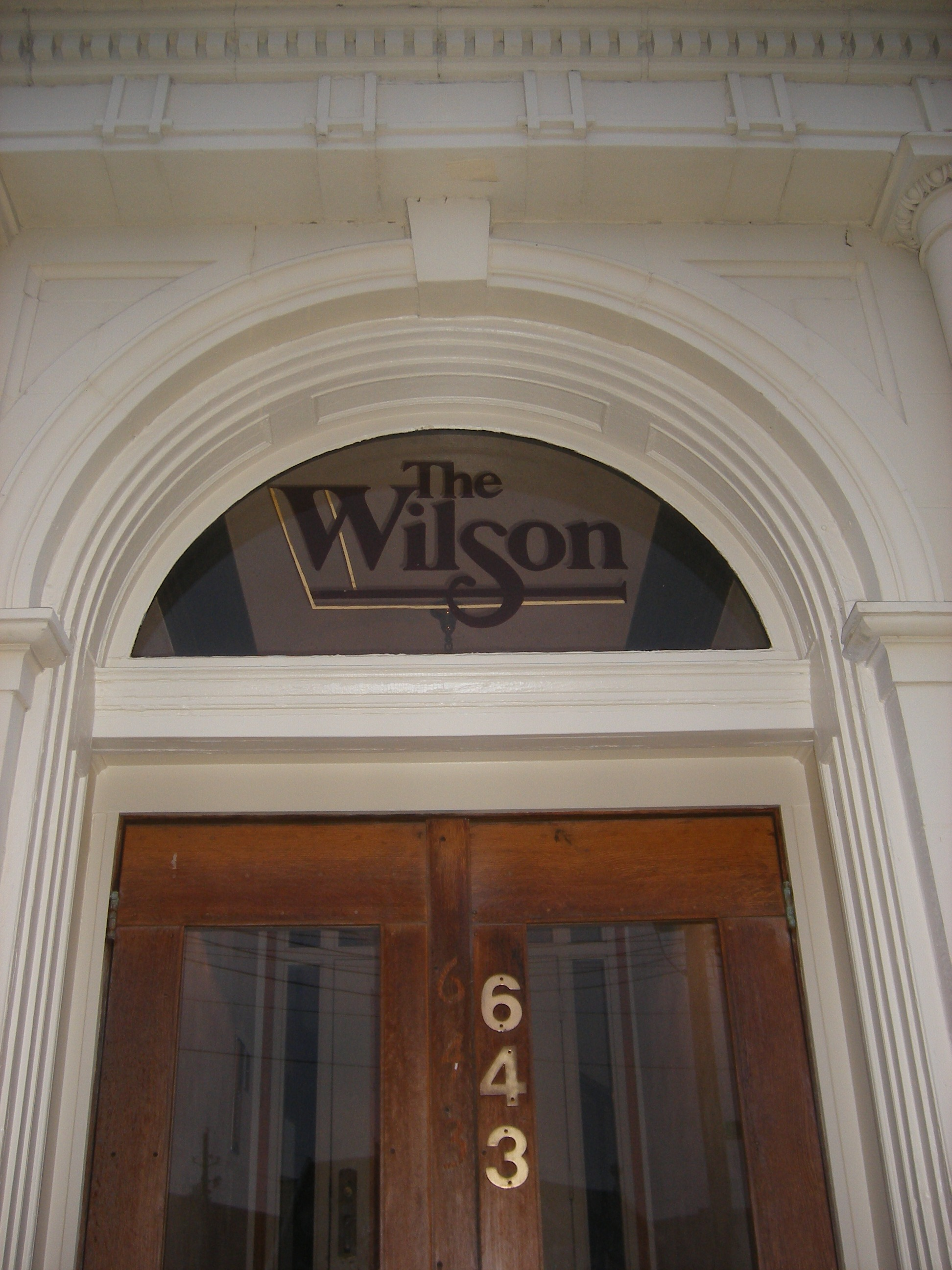
Front doorway detail

In 1983, the Wilson was listed on the National Register of Historic Places as part of the "Apartments and Flats of Downtown Indianapolis" multiple property submission. The apartments in this group were added to the Register for their architecture and for their place in the development of commerce and real estate development in Indianapolis.

Its NRHP nomination states: "The Wilson is significant for its use of numerous distinctive Renaissance Revival motifs derived from the classical vocabulary of architectural design." It has a five bay Doric order terra cotta entrance arcade and other architectural details.

== See also ==
- Apartments and Flats of Downtown Indianapolis Thematic Resources
- National Register of Historic Places listings in Center Township, Marion County, Indiana
