= Apartments and Flats of Downtown Indianapolis Thematic Resources =

Multiple listing in the U.S. National Register of Historic Places

The Apartments and Flats of Downtown Indianapolis Thematic Resources is a multiple property submission of apartments on the National Register of Historic Places in downtown Indianapolis, Indiana, United States. The area is roughly bounded by Interstate 65 and Fall Creek on the north, Interstate 65 and Interstate 70 on the east, Interstate 70 on the south, and Harding Street on the west.

== History ==
The 36 properties included in the nomination are generally in the period 1890 to 1930, when Indianapolis was experiencing its greatest economic growth. The oldest property, the Sid-Mar, was built in 1887, while the youngest property, the Wyndham, was built in 1930.

The need for apartments in downtown Indianapolis came about as a result of the city's industrial development during the late 19th century, led by the railroad and automobile industries, as well as Eli Lilly and Company. Banking, retail, and educational institutions grew during this time as well. The growth in population in Indianapolis after 1880 was fueled mostly by rural people moving to the city, as opposed to foreign immigration. The city was attractive to people who wanted educational, financial, and social advancement. The apartments and flats built in the city were an affordable alternative for people who wanted to move to the city before marrying or having children. Single women were needed in the workforce during World War I, so they found apartment dwelling acceptable. Young men moving from the countryside were moving away from living in boarding houses and choosing apartments.

== Architecture ==
In 1904, the Indianapolis City Council passed an ordinance prohibiting wood-frame construction in the downtown area. All of these apartment buildings were built of brick, with some use of Indiana limestone for ornamentation, lintels, and sills. Most of the buildings are three stories high, except for a few that were considered "high-rises". There is not a lot of differentiation between architectural styles. Most of the buildings use Classical Revival design features with symmetric facades, pilasters, keystones, and dentil and modillion cornices. Other architectural styles popular at the time, such as Gothic Revival and Second Empire are absent. The Blacherne has a few elements of Richardsonian Romanesque design, while a few bay windows show influence of Queen Anne style architecture in the United States. Tudor Revival architecture began its influence in the 1920s, with the Dartmouth and the Wyndham as examples. The McKay, built in 1924, has Art Deco detailing.

Initially, an apartment was defined as a suite of two or three rooms without a kitchen. These were popular with young men. A flat was defined as five to seven rooms, including a kitchen and a dining room, and were attractive to young married couples as well as retired couples. The distinction began to fade by the 1920s, and "apartment" became the label for any multi-unit rental properties.

== Properties included in the nomination ==
There were 37 properties in the nomination. An additional eligible property, the Delmar, was demolished while the nomination was in progress. One of the 37 listed buildings, the St. Clair, was removed from the National Register in 1991. The Chardwick and the Harriett were removed in 2011 due to destruction.

	Landmark name	Image	Date listed	Location	City or Town	Summary
1	The Alameda		September 15, 1983	37 W. St. Clair St. 39°46′41″N 86°9′33″W	Indianapolis	
2	The Alexandra		September 15, 1983	402-416 N. New Jersey St. and 332-336 E. Vermont St. 39°46′22″N 86°9′2″W	Indianapolis	An enlarged "Eastern" flat.
3	The Ambassador		September 15, 1983	39 E. 9th St. 39°46′44″N 86°9′21″W	Indianapolis	
4	The Baker		September 15, 1983	310 N. Alabama St. and 341 Massachusetts Ave. 39°46′18″N 86°9′9″W	Indianapolis	The Baker, also known as Massala, is a historic apartment building in Indianapolis, Indiana, built in 1905. This three-story, brick structure features a blend of Classical Revival and Queen Anne styles, with limestone detailing and paired two-story bay windows. Listed on the National Register of Historic Places in 1983, it is located in the Massachusetts Avenue Commercial District.
5	The Blacherne		September 15, 1983	402 N. Meridian St. 39°46′22″N 86°9′29″W	Indianapolis	Built in 1895 and owned by Lew Wallace, the Blacherne was a fashionable residential address for leaders in Indianapolis business and society. Wallace lived in the building during the city's winter social season. The success of this apartment building spurred the construction of many others during the ensuing decade.
6	The Burton		September 15, 1983	821-823 N. Pennsylvania St. 39°46′42″N 86°9′20″W	Indianapolis	
7	The Cathcart		September 15, 1983	103 E. 9th St. 39°46′44″N 86°9′20″W	Indianapolis	
8	The Chadwick		September 15, 1983	1005 N. Pennsylvania St. 39°46′52″N 86°9′19″W	Indianapolis	The Chadwick was destroyed by fire in January 2011 and delisted later that year.
9	The Colonial		September 15, 1983	126 E. Vermont St. and 402-408 N. Delaware St. 39°46′22″N 86°9′15″W	Indianapolis	
10	The Dartmouth		September 15, 1983	221 E. Michigan St. 39°46′29″N 86°9′12″W	Indianapolis	
11	Delaware Court		September 15, 1983	1001-1015 N. Delaware St. 39°46′52″N 86°9′13″W	Indianapolis	Built in 1916–17 by developer George William Brown.
12	Delaware Flats		September 15, 1983	120-128 N. Delaware St. 39°46′8″N 86°9′16″W	Indianapolis	Built in 1887.
13	The Devonshire		September 15, 1983	412 N. Alabama St. 39°46′24″N 86°9′9″W	Indianapolis	
14	The Emelie		September 15, 1983	326-330 N. Senate Ave.and 301-303 W. Vermont St. 39°46′21″N 86°9′48″W	Indianapolis	
15	The Glencoe		September 15, 1983	627 N. Pennsylvania St. 39°46′35″N 86°9′20″W	Indianapolis	
16	The Grover		September 15, 1983	615 N. Pennsylvania St. 39°46′34″N 86°9′20″W	Indianapolis	
17	The Harriett		September 15, 1983	124-128 N. East St. 39°46′9″N 86°8′57″W	Indianapolis	The Harriett was demolished and subsequently delisted in 2011
18	The Lodge		September 15, 1983	829 N. Pennsylvania St. 39°46′43″N 86°9′20″W	Indianapolis	Built in 1905 by developer E.G. Spink for Caleb N. Lodge, this is an example of the "Eastern" flat type.
19	The Martens		September 15, 1983	348-356 Indiana Ave. 39°46′20″N 86°9′47″W	Indianapolis	
20	The Massachusetts		September 15, 1983	421-427 Massachusetts Ave. 39°46′24″N 86°9′3″W	Indianapolis	
21	The Mayleeno		September 15, 1983	416-418 E. Vermont St. 39°46′22″N 86°8′59″W	Indianapolis	
22	The McKay		September 15, 1983	611 N. Pennsylvania St. 39°46′33″N 86°9′20″W	Indianapolis	
23	The Myrtle Fern		September 15, 1983	221 E. 9th St. 39°46′44″N 86°9′11″W	Indianapolis	
24	The Oxford		September 15, 1983	316 E. Vermont St. 39°46′22″N 86°9′6″W	Indianapolis	
25	The Pennsylvania		September 15, 1983	919 N. Pennsylvania St. 39°46′46″N 86°9′19″W	Indianapolis	Built in 1906 by developer George William Brown, the Pennsylvania is an example of the "Eastern" flat type.
26	The Plaza		September 15, 1983	902 N. Pennsylvania St. and 36 E. 9th St. 39°46′45″N 86°9′21″W	Indianapolis	
27	The Rink		September 15, 1983	401 N. Illinois St. 39°46′22″N 86°9′34″W	Indianapolis	
28	The Savoy		September 15, 1983	36 W. Vermont St. 39°46′22″N 86°9′32″W	Indianapolis	
29	The Shelton		September 15, 1983	825 N. Delaware St. 39°46′42″N 86°9′13″W	Indianapolis	
30	The Sid-Mar		September 15, 1983	401-403 Massachusetts Ave. 39°46′22″N 86°9′7″W	Indianapolis	Built in 1887.
31	The Spink		September 15, 1983	230 E. 9th St. 39°46′45″N 86°9′10″W	Indianapolis	
32	The Sylvania		September 15, 1983	801 N. Pennsylvania St. and 108 E. St. Clair St. 39°46′41″N 86°9′20″W	Indianapolis	
33	The Vienna		September 15, 1983	306 E. New York St. 39°46′17″N 86°9′8″W	Indianapolis	Built in 1908 by developer George William Brown.
34	The Wil-Fra-Mar		September 15, 1983	318-320 E. Vermont St. 39°46′22″N 86°9′5″W	Indianapolis	Built after 1887, the Wil-Fra-Mar is an early example of the "Eastern" flat type.
35	Wilson		September 15, 1983	643 Ft. Wayne Ave. 39°46′34″N 86°9′17″W	Indianapolis	
36	The Wyndham		September 15, 1983	1040 N. Delaware St. 39°46′56″N 86°9′14″W	Indianapolis	

== See also ==
- National Register of Historic Places listings in Center Township, Marion County, Indiana
