= The Vienna =

- Vienna
- U.S. National Register of Historic Places
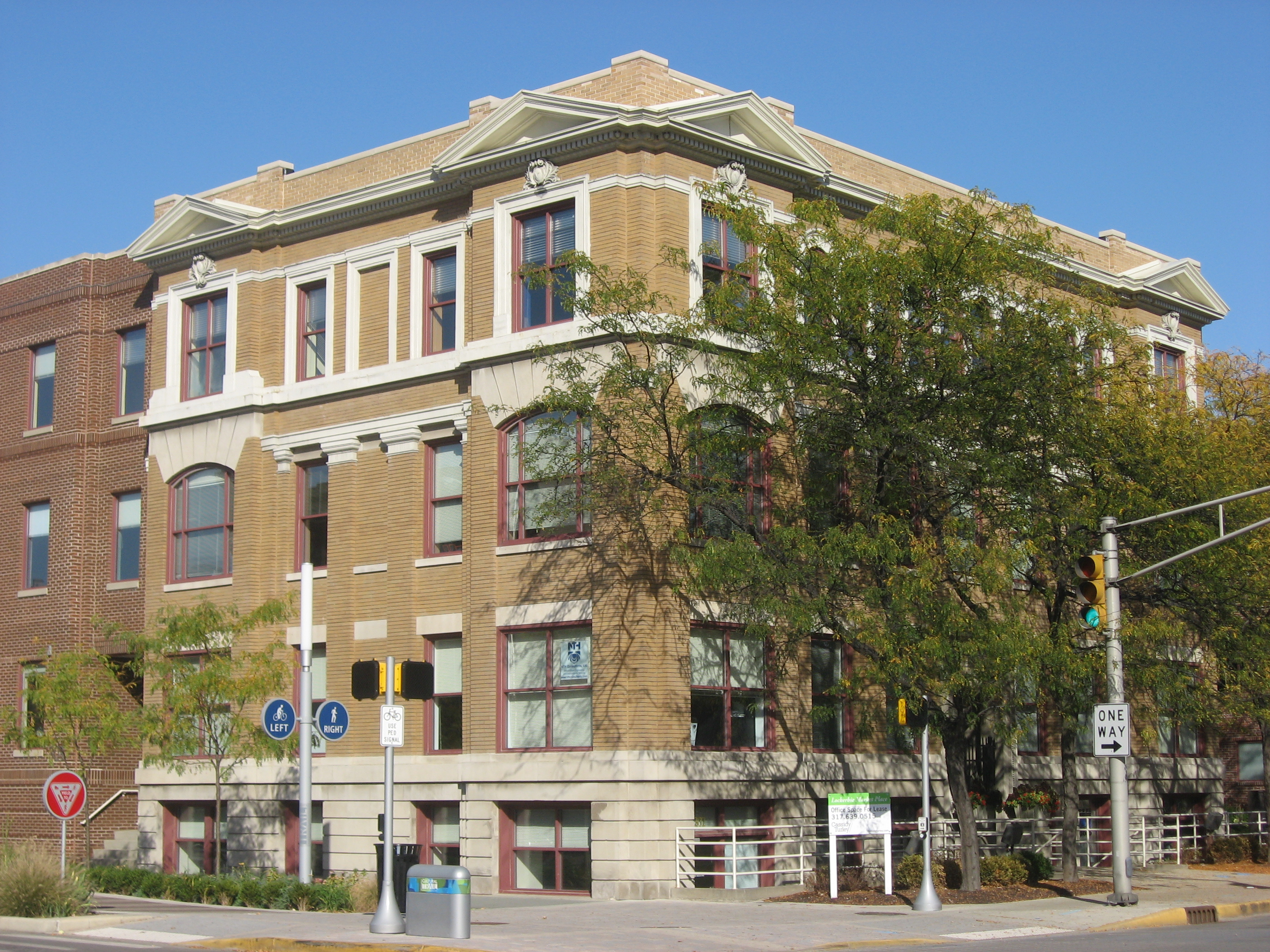
- The Vienna, October 2010

- Location within Indianapolis Location within Indianapolis Location within Indiana Location within the United States
- Location: 306 E. New York St., Indianapolis, Indiana
- Coordinates: 39°46′17″N 86°9′8″W
- Area: less than one acre
- Built: 1908
- Architect: Brand & Brothers
- Architectural style: Classical Revival
- MPS: Apartments and Flats of Downtown Indianapolis TR
- NRHP reference No.: 83000087
- Added to NRHP: September 15, 1983

The Vienna is a historic apartment building located at Indianapolis, Indiana. It was built in 1908, and is a three-story, nine bay by seven bay, Classical Revival style yellow brick and grey limestone building. It sits on a rusticated raised basement and has six Tuscan order pilasters. It features projecting pedimented corner pavilions.

It was listed on the National Register of Historic Places in 1983.

== See also ==
- Massachusetts Avenue Commercial District
- Apartments and Flats of Downtown Indianapolis Thematic Resources
- National Register of Historic Places listings in Center Township, Marion County, Indiana
