= The Pennsylvania =

- Pennsylvania
- U.S. National Register of Historic Places
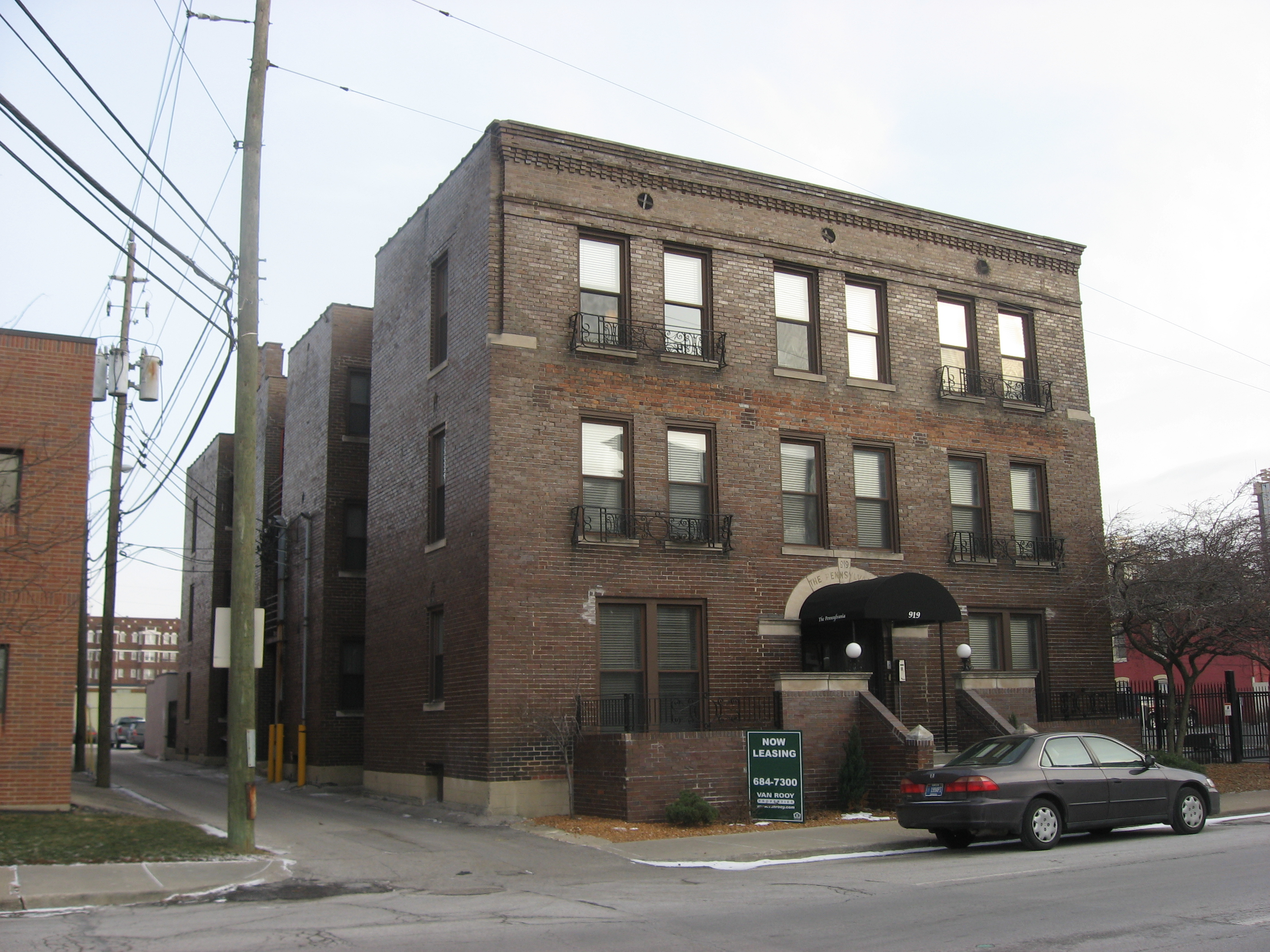
- The Pennsylvania, January 2010

- Location within Indianapolis Location within Indiana Location within the United States
- Location: 919 N. Pennsylvania St., Indianapolis, Indiana
- Coordinates: 39°46′46″N 86°9′19″W
- Area: less than one acre
- Built: 1906
- Built by: Nuerge and Reinking
- Architectural style: Classical Revival
- MPS: Apartments and Flats of Downtown Indianapolis TR
- NRHP reference No.: 83000082
- Added to NRHP: September 15, 1983

The Pennsylvania is a historic apartment building located at Indianapolis, Indiana. It was built in 1906, and is a three-story, double "H" plan, Classical Revival style red brick and grey limestone building. It features a round arched main entrance, wrought iron balcony grills, and terra cotta coping.

It was listed on the National Register of Historic Places in 1983.

== See also ==
- Apartments and Flats of Downtown Indianapolis Thematic Resources
- National Register of Historic Places listings in Center Township, Marion County, Indiana
