= The Martens =

- Martens
- U.S. National Register of Historic Places
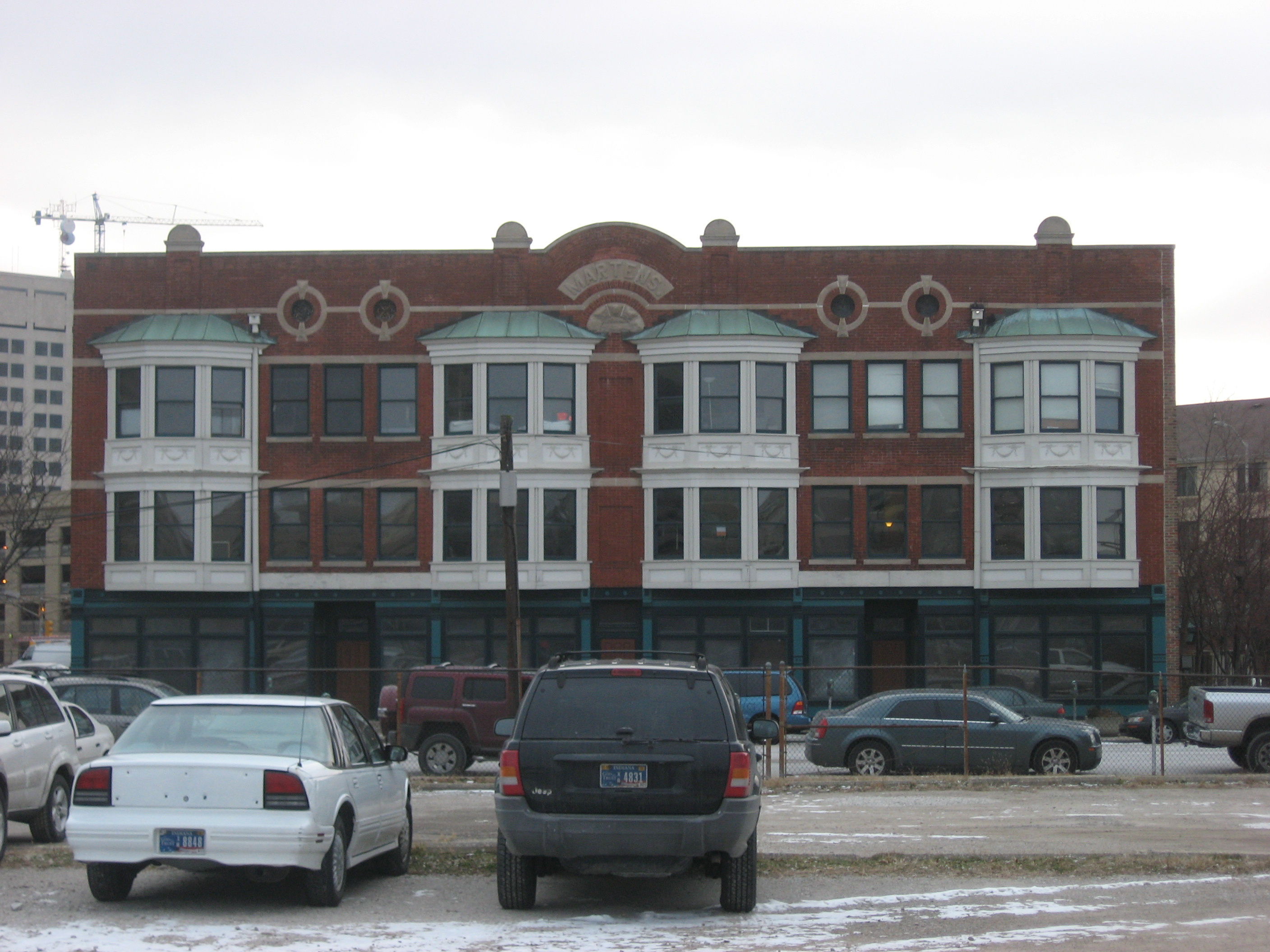
- The Martens, January 2010

- Location within Indianapolis Location within Indiana Location within the United States
- Location: 348-356 Indiana Ave., Indianapolis, Indiana
- Coordinates: 39°46′20″N 86°9′47″W
- Area: less than one acre
- Built: 1900
- Architectural style: Classical Revival
- MPS: Apartments and Flats of Downtown Indianapolis TR
- NRHP reference No.: 83000070
- Added to NRHP: September 15, 1983

The Martens is a historic apartment building located at Indianapolis, Indiana. It was built in 1900, and is a three-story, 19 bay wide, brick building. It has commercial storefronts on the first floor with Classical Revival style cast iron pilaster posts and supporting "I" beam framing. It features two-story projecting bays on the upper stories.

It was listed on the National Register of Historic Places in 1983.

== See also ==
- Apartments and Flats of Downtown Indianapolis Thematic Resources
- National Register of Historic Places listings in Center Township, Marion County, Indiana
