= The Savoy (Indianapolis, Indiana) =

- Savoy
- U.S. National Register of Historic Places
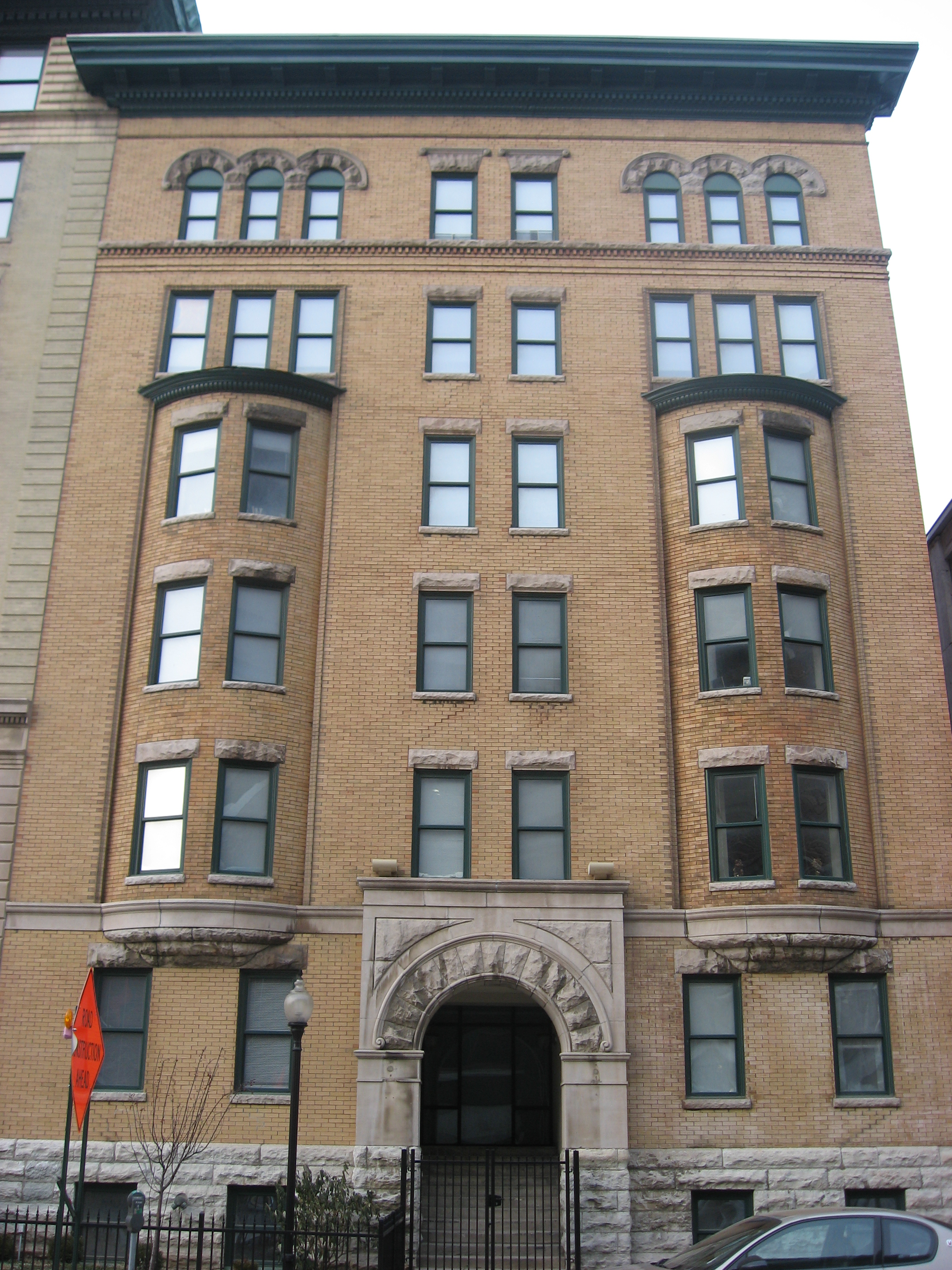
- The Savoy, January 2010

- Location within Indianapolis Location within Indiana Location within the United States
- Location: 36 W. Vermont St., Indianapolis, Indiana
- Coordinates: 39°46′22″N 86°9′32″W
- Area: less than one acre
- Built: 1898
- Architect: Winterrowd, Thomas A.
- Architectural style: Romanesque
- MPS: Apartments and Flats of Downtown Indianapolis TR
- NRHP reference No.: 83000076
- Added to NRHP: September 15, 1983

The Savoy is a historic apartment building located at Indianapolis, Indiana. It was built in 1898, and is a six-story, three-bay-wide, buff-colored brick building on a raised basement. It has rock faced arched entrance, oriel windows on the second through fourth floors, Romanesque Revival style arched windows on the top floor, and a projecting cornice.

It was listed on the National Register of Historic Places in 1983.

== See also ==
- Apartments and Flats of Downtown Indianapolis Thematic Resources
- National Register of Historic Places listings in Center Township, Marion County, Indiana
