= The Wyndham =

- Wyndham
- U.S. National Register of Historic Places
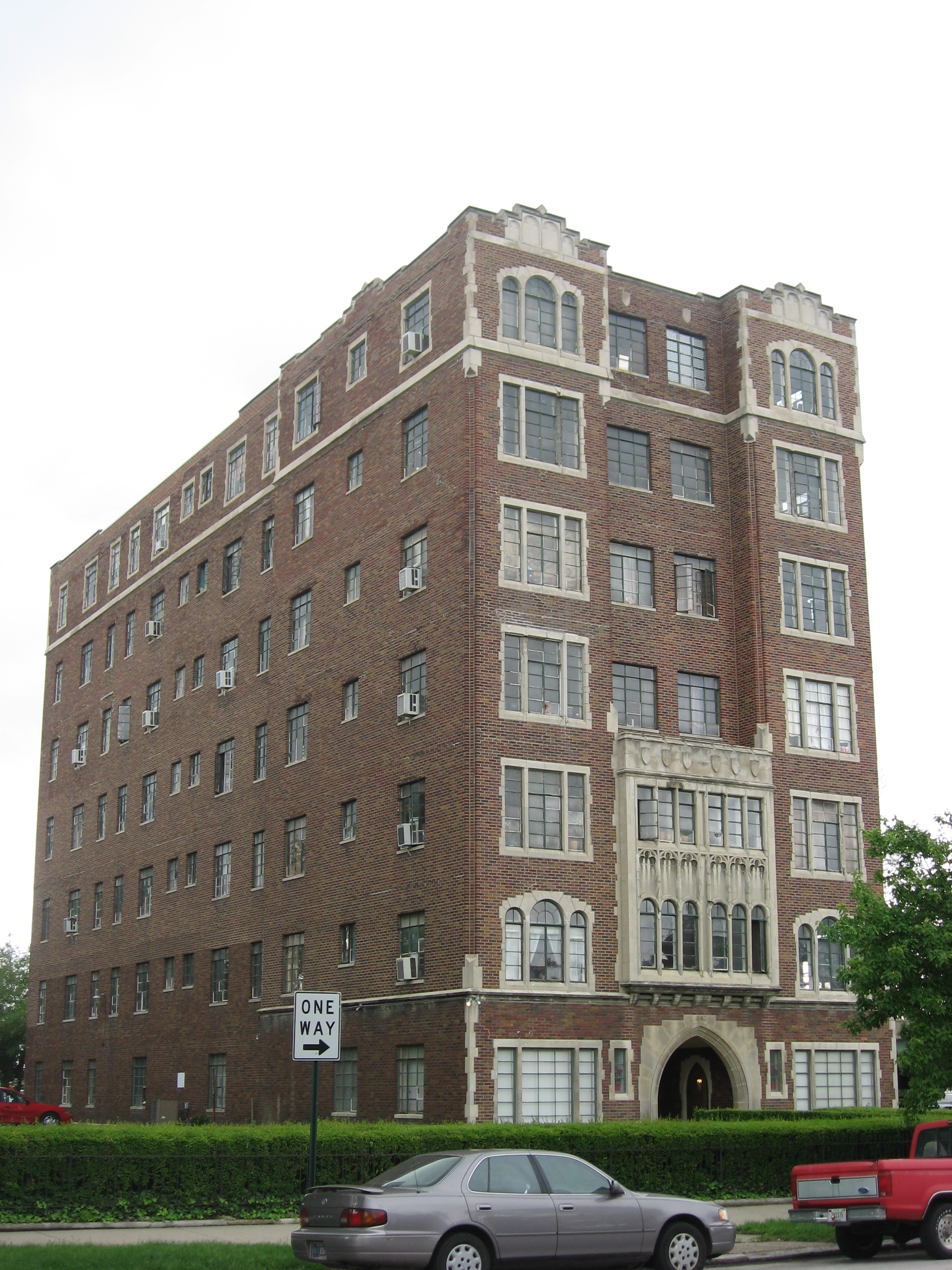
- The Wyndham, May 2010

- Location within Indianapolis Location within Indiana Location within the United States
- Location: 1040 N. Delaware St., Indianapolis, Indiana
- Coordinates: 39°46′56″N 86°9′14″W
- Area: less than one acre
- Built: 1929
- Built by: Foster Engineering
- Architectural style: Tudor Revival
- MPS: Apartments and Flats of Downtown Indianapolis TR
- NRHP reference No.: 83000090
- Added to NRHP: September 15, 1983

The Wyndham is a historic apartment building located at Indianapolis, Indiana. It was built in 1929, and is a seven-story, four bay wide, Tudor Revival style multicolor brick building. It features a recessed central entrance with pointed limestone arch, intricately detailed oriel window at the second and third floors, and a parapet with four blind trefoil arches.

By the time the current owner, Pearl Companies, bought the building for $1.4 million in 2015, the building had deteriorated to the point that it was almost vacant. Pearl spent $5.7 million for renovations. Originally the building contained 48 apartments, which Pearl reduced to 37 to increase the floor space for each unit. The doorways for the former units, as well as other interior details, were retained.

It was listed on the National Register of Historic Places in 1983.

== See also ==
- Apartments and Flats of Downtown Indianapolis Thematic Resources
- National Register of Historic Places listings in Center Township, Marion County, Indiana
