= The Colonial (Indianapolis, Indiana) =

- Colonial
- U.S. National Register of Historic Places
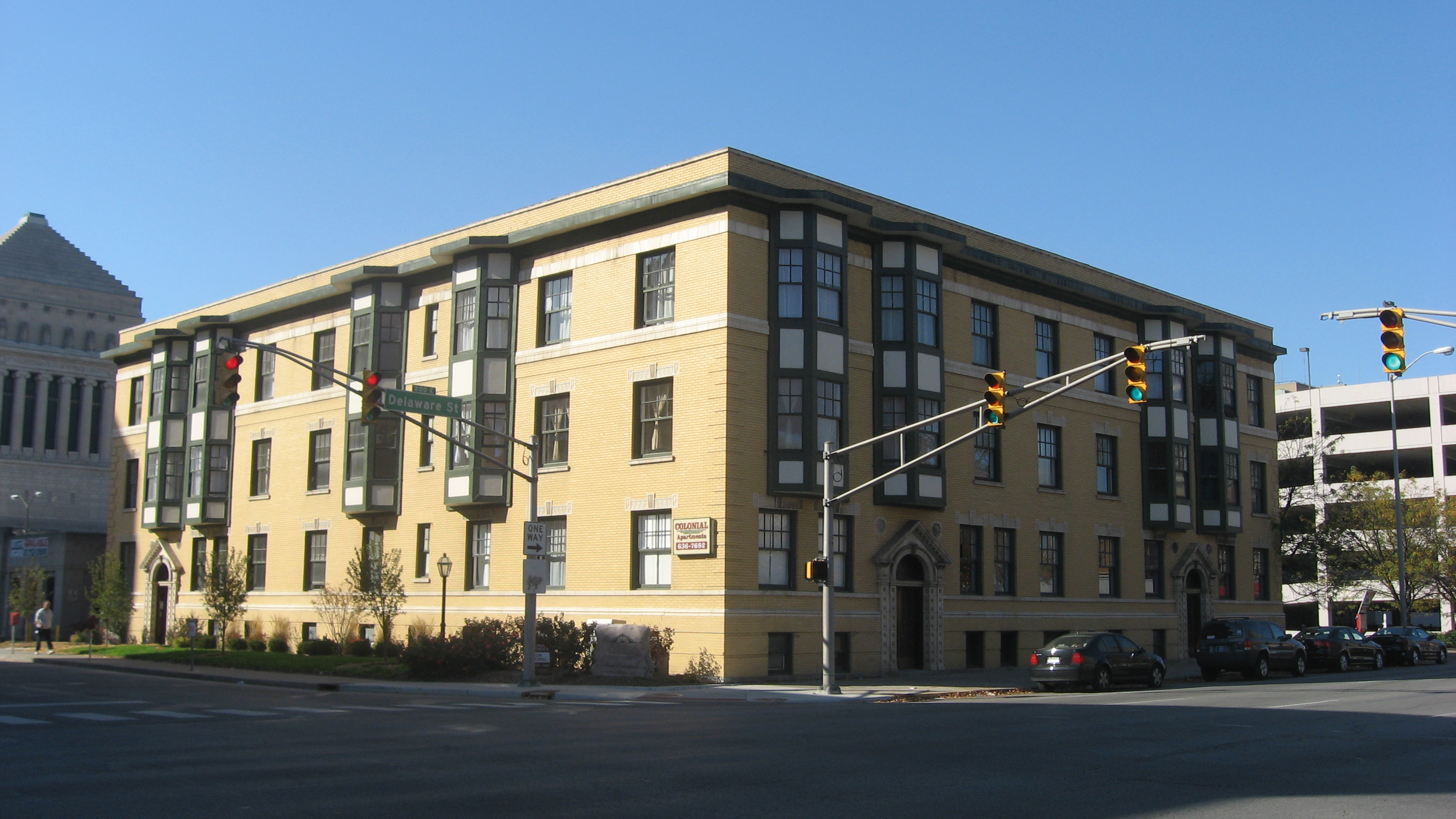
- Front of the Colonial

- Location within Indianapolis Location within Indianapolis Location within Indiana Location within the United States
- Location: 126 E. Vermont St. and 402-408 N. Delaware St., Indianapolis, Indiana
- Coordinates: 39°46′22″N 86°9′15″W
- Area: less than one acre
- Built: 1900
- Architectural style: Classical Revival
- MPS: Apartments and Flats of Downtown Indianapolis TR
- NRHP reference No.: 83000062
- Added to NRHP: September 15, 1983

The Colonial is a historic apartment building located at Indianapolis, Indiana, United States. It was built in 1900, and is a three-story, eight bay by ten bay, Classical Revival style yellow brick building. It features a variety of terracotta decorative elements and two-story bay windows on the upper floors.

It was listed on the National Register of Historic Places in 1983.

== See also ==
- Apartments and Flats of Downtown Indianapolis Thematic Resources
- National Register of Historic Places listings in Center Township, Marion County, Indiana
