= The Grover =

- Grover
- U.S. National Register of Historic Places
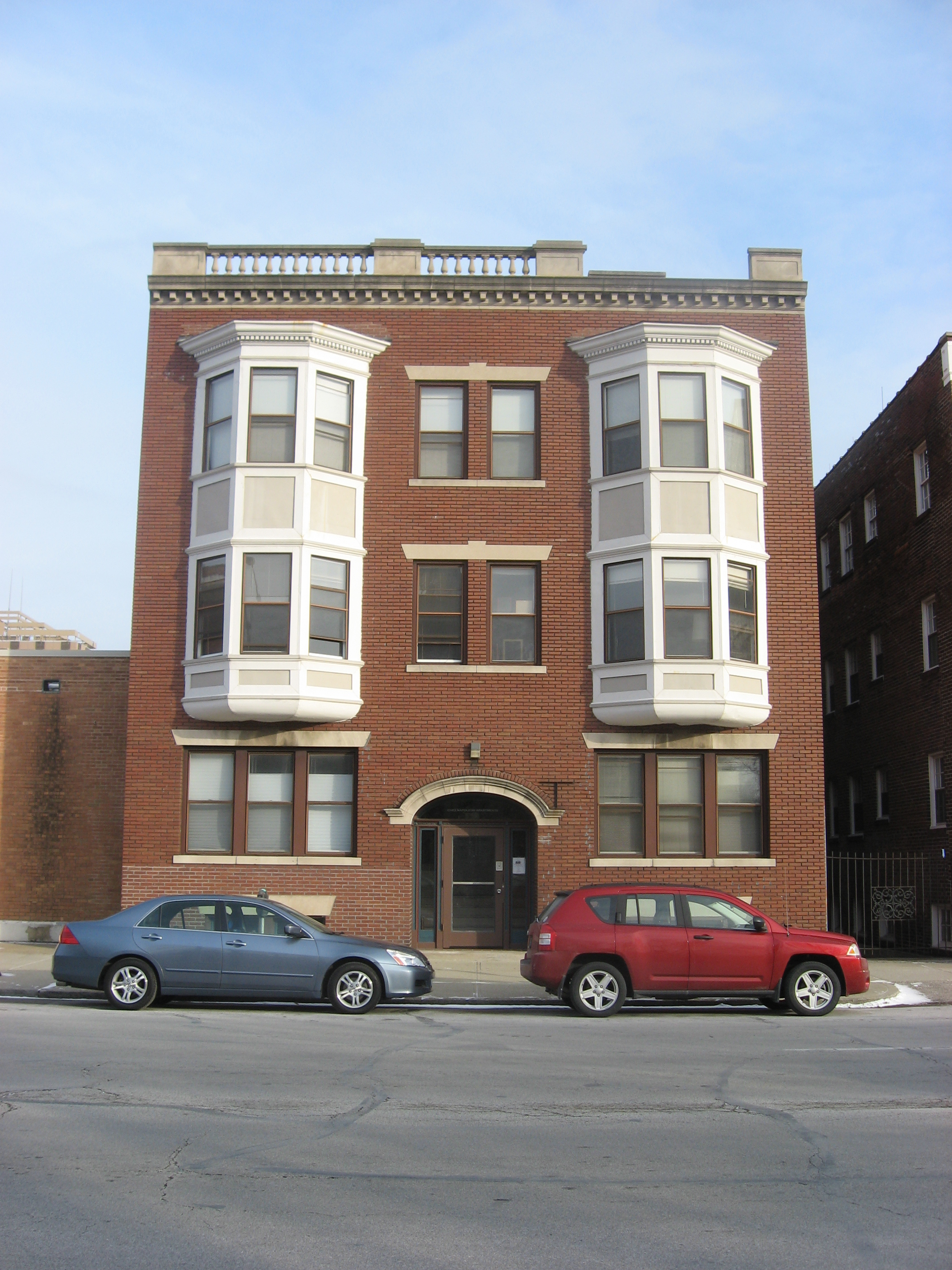
- The Grover, January 2010

- Location within Indianapolis Location within Indianapolis Location within Indiana Location within the United States
- Location: 615 N. Pennsylvania St., Indianapolis, Indiana
- Coordinates: 39°46′34″N 86°9′20″W
- Area: less than one acre
- Built: 1914
- Built by: Grover, Arther B.
- MPS: Apartments and Flats of Downtown Indianapolis TR
- NRHP reference No.: 83000056
- Added to NRHP: September 15, 1983

The Grover is a historic apartment building located at Indianapolis, Indiana. It was built in 1914, and is a three-story, I-shaped, red brick building. It features a recessed entrance with limestone voussoir arch, bay windows on the upper stories, and a limestone frieze.

It was listed on the National Register of Historic Places in 1983.

== See also ==
- Apartments and Flats of Downtown Indianapolis Thematic Resources
- National Register of Historic Places listings in Center Township, Marion County, Indiana
