= The Sylvania =

- Sylvania
- U.S. National Register of Historic Places
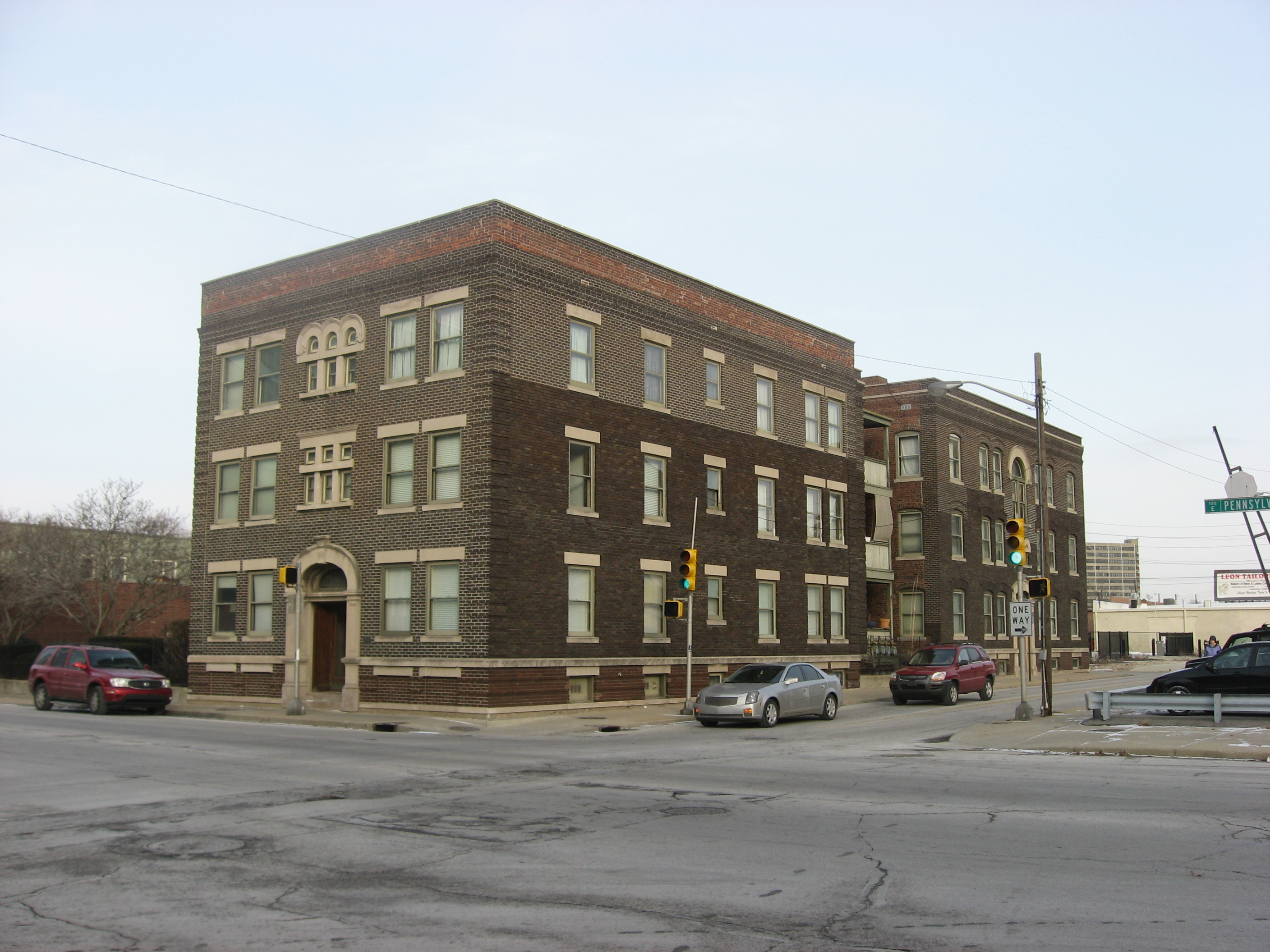
- The Sylvania, January 2010

- Location within Indianapolis Location within Indiana Location within the United States
- Location: 801 N. Pennsylvania St. and 108 E. St. Clair St., Indianapolis, Indiana
- Coordinates: 39°46′41″N 86°9′20″W
- Area: less than one acre
- Built: 1906
- Architectural style: Renaissance Revival, Classical Revival
- MPS: Apartments and Flats of Downtown Indianapolis TR
- NRHP reference No.: 83000086
- Added to NRHP: September 15, 1983

The Sylvania is a historic apartment building located at Indianapolis, Indiana. It was built in 1906, and consists of two three-story, detached glazed brick and grey limestone buildings. It features Renaissance Revival style door and window surrounds and Classical Revival style design elements.

It was listed on the National Register of Historic Places in 1983.

== See also ==
- Apartments and Flats of Downtown Indianapolis Thematic Resources
- National Register of Historic Places listings in Center Township, Marion County, Indiana
