= The McKay =

- McKay
- U.S. National Register of Historic Places
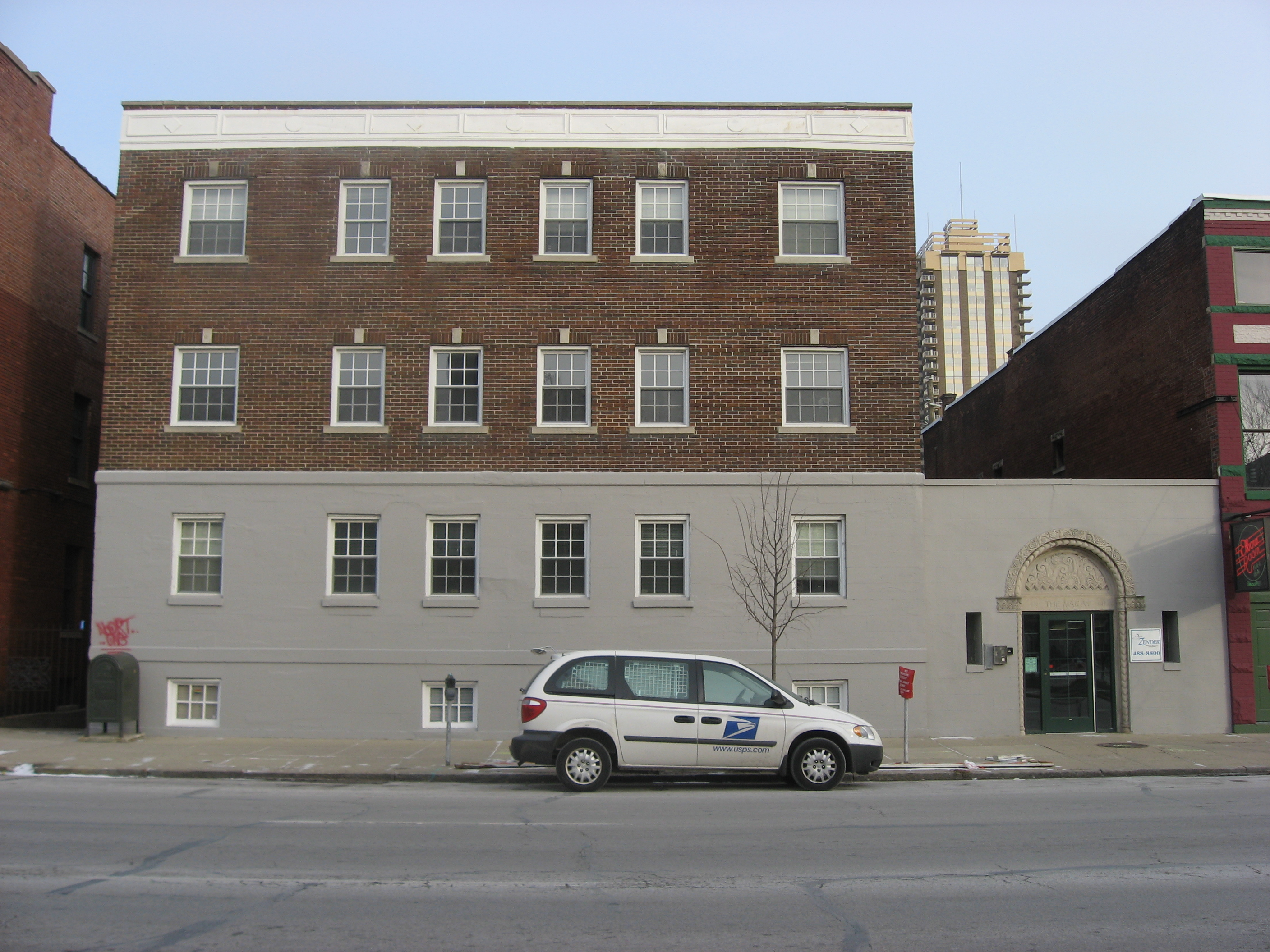

- Location within Indianapolis Location within Indianapolis Location within Indiana Location within the United States
- Location: 611 N. Pennsylvania St., Indianapolis, Indiana
- Coordinates: 39°46′33″N 86°9′20″W
- Area: less than one acre
- Built: 1924
- Architectural style: Art Deco
- MPS: Apartments and Flats of Downtown Indianapolis TR
- NRHP reference No.: 83000074
- Added to NRHP: September 15, 1983

The McKay is a historic apartment building in Indianapolis, Indiana. It was built in 1924, and is a three-story, trapezoidal shaped, Art Deco style brown cinder brick and concrete building on a raised basement. It has a one-story entrance foyer addition and Art Deco bas-relief carvings.

It was listed on the National Register of Historic Places in 1983.

== See also ==
- Apartments and Flats of Downtown Indianapolis Thematic Resources
- National Register of Historic Places listings in Center Township, Marion County, Indiana
