= The Alexandra (Indianapolis, Indiana) =

- Alexandra
- U.S. National Register of Historic Places
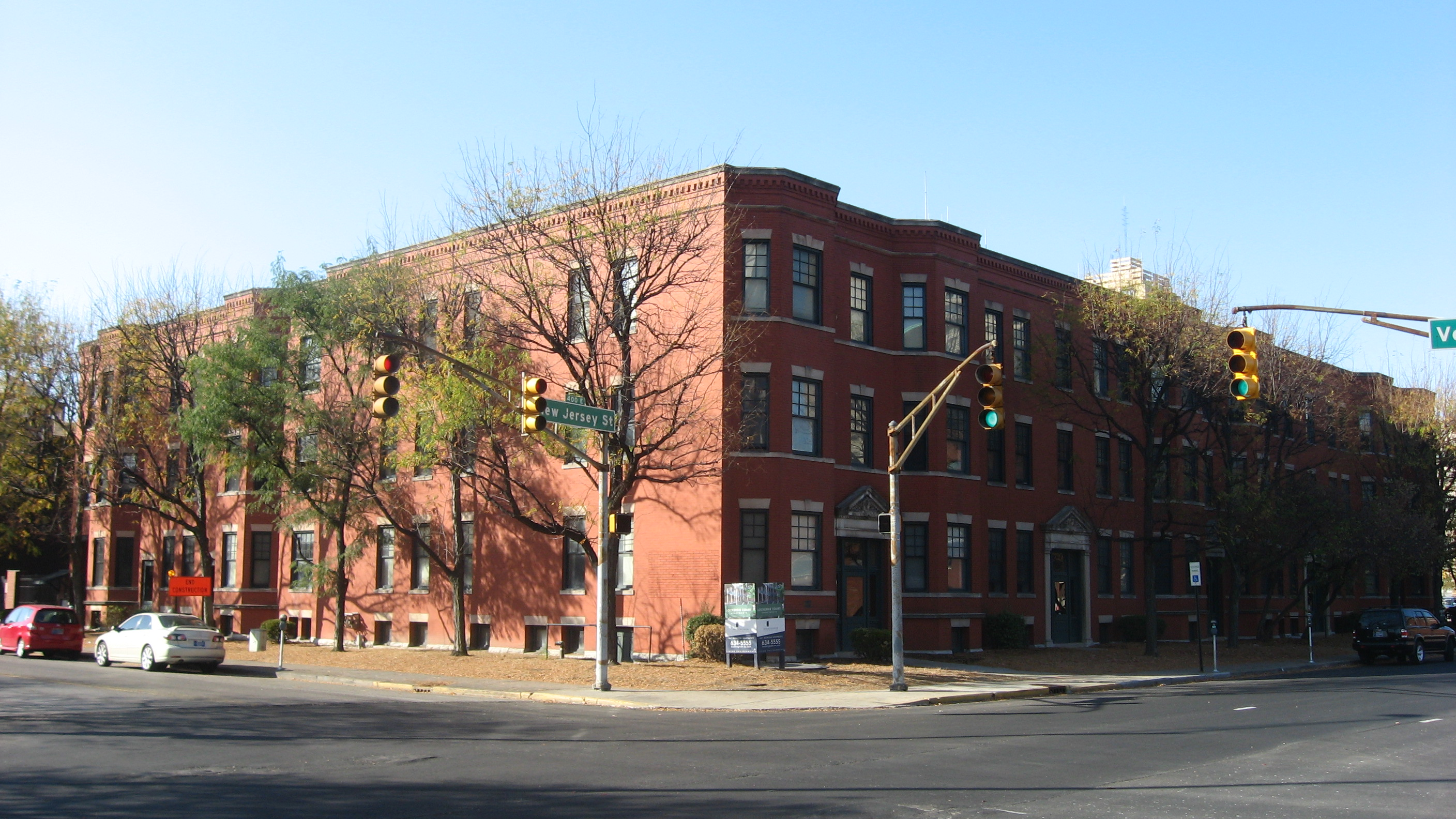
- The Alexandra, October 2010

- Location within Indianapolis Location within Indianapolis Location within Indiana Location within the United States
- Location: 402-416 N. New Jersey St. and 332-336 E. Vermont St., Indianapolis, Indiana
- Coordinates: 39°46′22″N 86°9′2″W
- Area: less than one acre
- Built: 1902
- Architectural style: Georgian Revival
- MPS: Apartments and Flats of Downtown Indianapolis TR
- NRHP reference No.: 83000053
- Added to NRHP: September 15, 1983

The Alexandra, also known as Lockerbie Court, is a historic apartment building located at Indianapolis, Indiana. It was built in 1902, and is a three-story, red brick and grey limestone building on a raised basement with Georgian Revival style detailing. It features six three-story polygonal bay windows on the front facade.

It was listed on the National Register of Historic Places in 1983.

== See also ==
- Massachusetts Avenue Commercial District
- Apartments and Flats of Downtown Indianapolis Thematic Resources
- National Register of Historic Places listings in Center Township, Marion County, Indiana
