= The Chadwick =

- Chadwick
- Formerly listed on the U.S. National Register of Historic Places
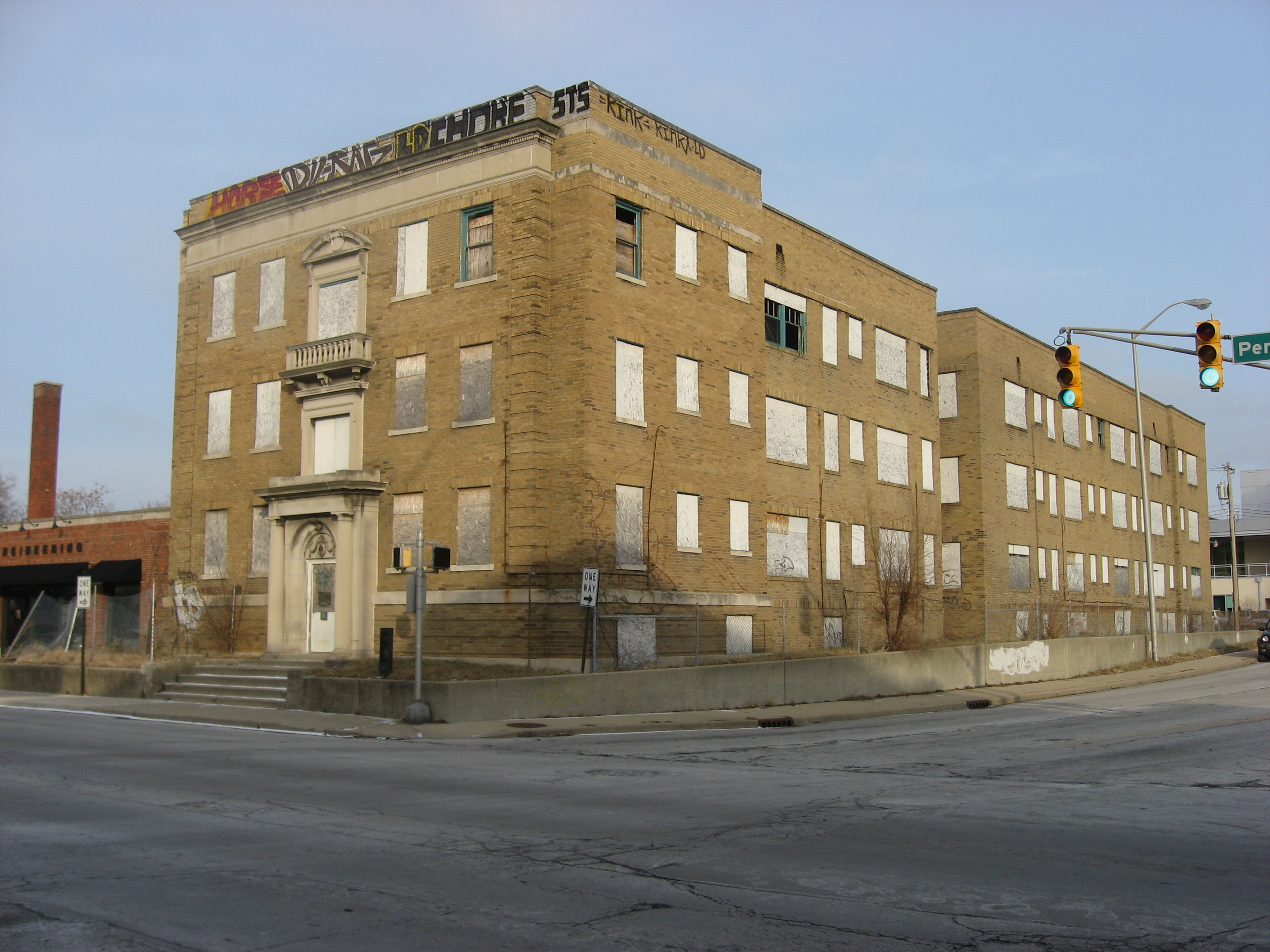
- The Chadwick, January 2010

- Location within Indianapolis Location within Indiana Location within the United States
- Location: 1005 N. Pennsylvania St., Indianapolis, Indiana
- Coordinates: 39°46′52″N 86°9′19″W
- Area: less than one acre
- Architectural style: Georgian Revival
- MPS: Apartments and Flats of Downtown Indianapolis TR
- NRHP reference No.: 83000061

Significant dates
- Added to NRHP: September 15, 1983
- Removed from NRHP: March 21, 2011

The Chadwick was a historic apartment building located at Indianapolis, Indiana. It was built in 1925 (101 years ago), and was a three-story, five-bay, I-shaped, Georgian Revival style buff brick building with limestone detailing. It featured Tuscan order engaged columns at the entrance. It was destroyed by fire in January 2011.

It was listed on the National Register of Historic Places in 1983 and delisted in 2011.

== See also ==
- Apartments and Flats of Downtown Indianapolis Thematic Resources
- National Register of Historic Places listings in Center Township, Marion County, Indiana
