= The Burton =

- Burton
- U.S. National Register of Historic Places
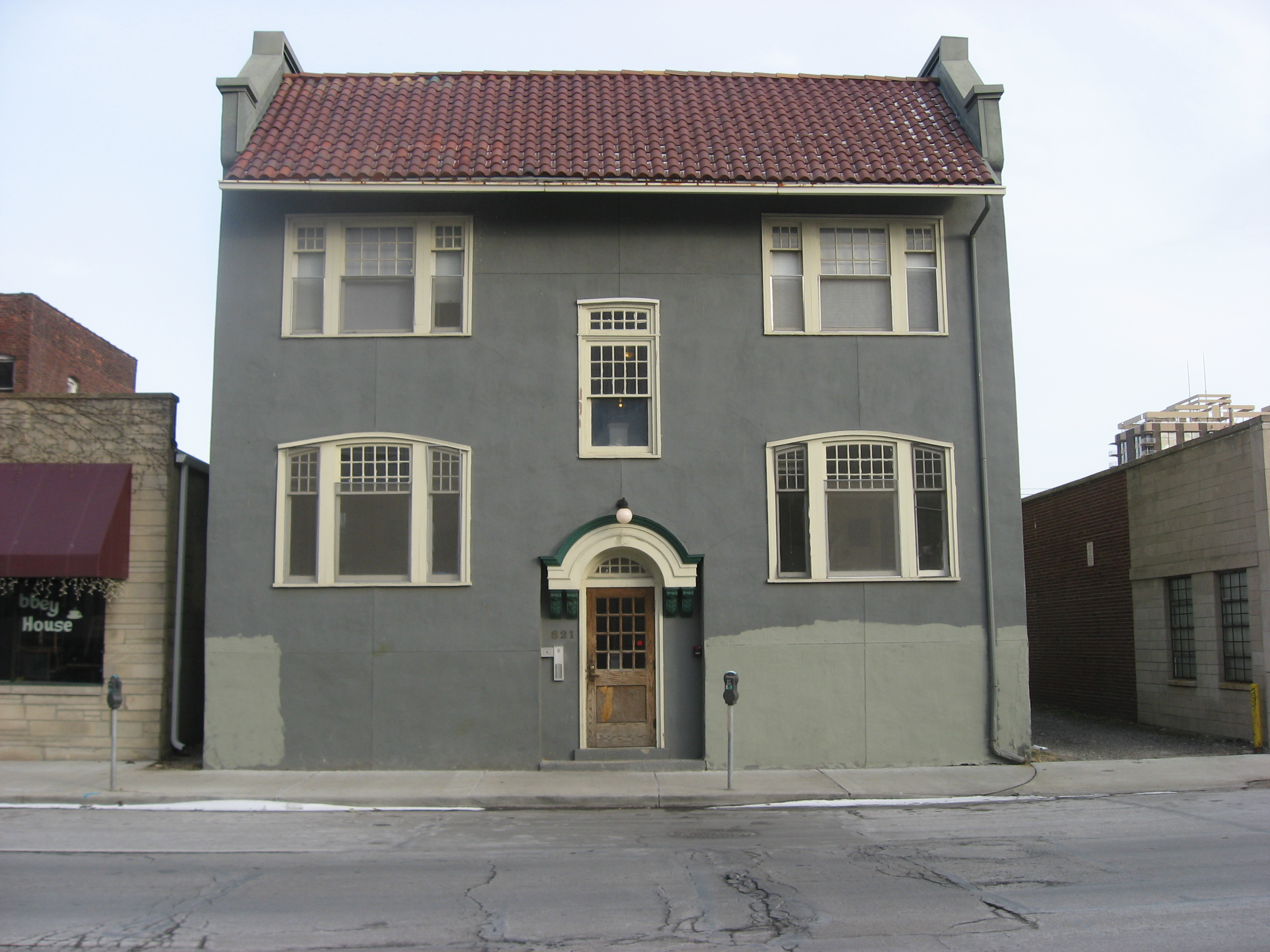
- The Burton, January 2010

- Location within Indianapolis Location within Indianapolis Location within Indiana Location within the United States
- Location: 821-823 N. Pennsylvania St., Indianapolis, Indiana
- Coordinates: 39°46′42″N 86°9′20″W
- Area: less than one acre
- Built: 1920
- MPS: Apartments and Flats of Downtown Indianapolis TR
- NRHP reference No.: 83000059
- Added to NRHP: September 15, 1983

The Burton is a historic apartment building located at Indianapolis, Indiana. It was built in 1920, and is a two-story, Spanish Colonial Revival style stuccoed building on a raised basement. It features a semicircular metal arched entrance hood, stepped gables, and a red tile roof.

It was listed on the National Register of Historic Places in 1983.

== See also ==
- Apartments and Flats of Downtown Indianapolis Thematic Resources
- National Register of Historic Places listings in Center Township, Marion County, Indiana
