= The Harriett =

- Harriett
- Formerly listed on the U.S. National Register of Historic Places
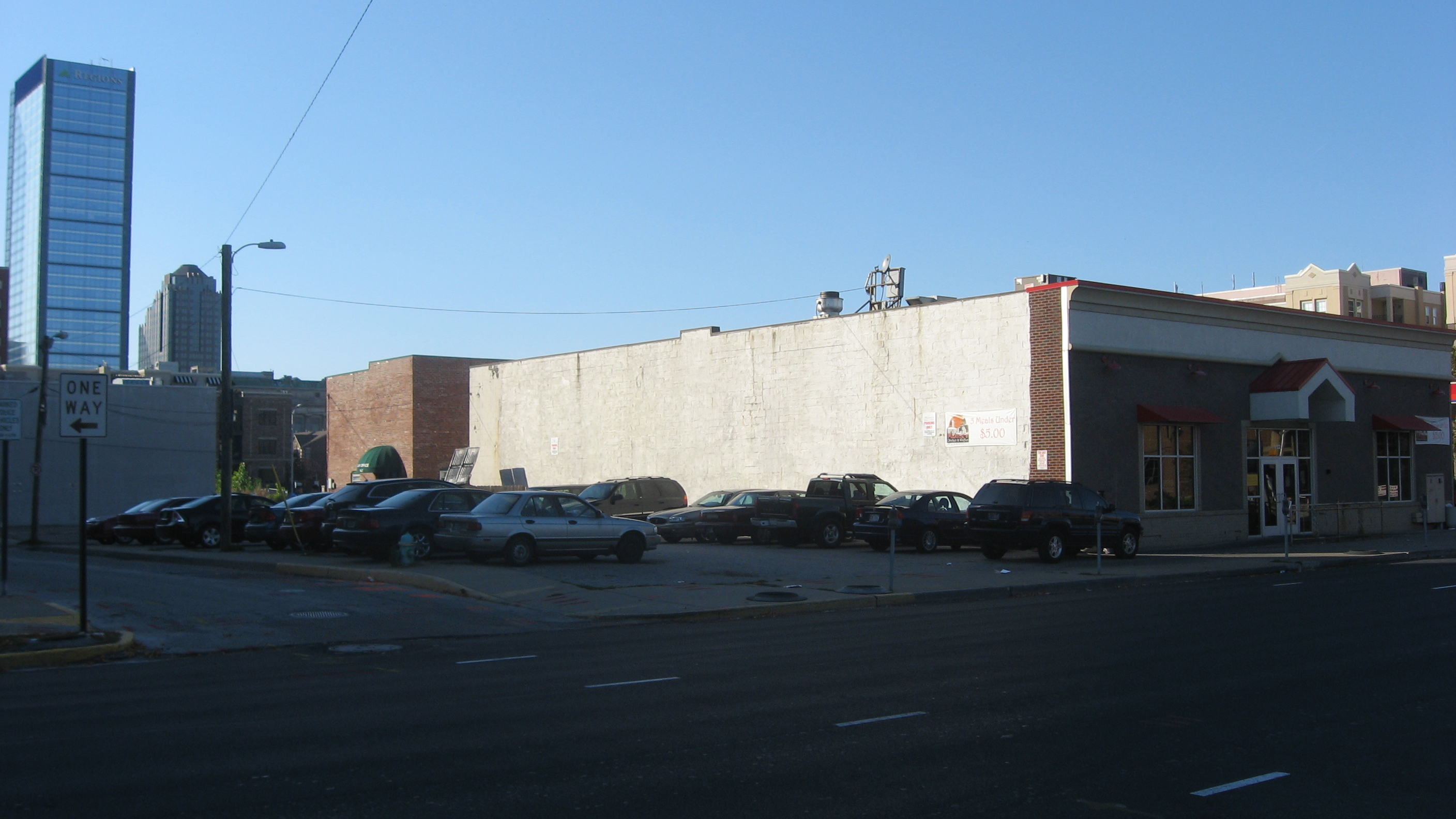
- Site of the Harriet, October 2010

- Location within Indianapolis Location within Indianapolis Location within Indiana Location within the United States
- Location: 124-128 N. East St., Indianapolis, Indiana
- Coordinates: 39°46′9″N 86°8′57″W
- Area: less than one acre
- Built: c. 1905
- Architectural style: Classical Revival
- MPS: Apartments and Flats of Downtown Indianapolis TR
- NRHP reference No.: 83000057

Significant dates
- Added to NRHP: September 15, 1983
- Removed from NRHP: June 8, 2011

The Harriett was a historic apartment building located at Indianapolis, Indiana. It was built about 1905, and was a three-story, U-shaped, Classical Revival style yellow brick and grey limestone building. It has been demolished.

It was listed on the National Register of Historic Places in 1983 and delisted in 2011.

== See also ==
- Apartments and Flats of Downtown Indianapolis Thematic Resources
- National Register of Historic Places listings in Center Township, Marion County, Indiana
