= The Lodge (Indianapolis, Indiana) =

- Lodge
- U.S. National Register of Historic Places
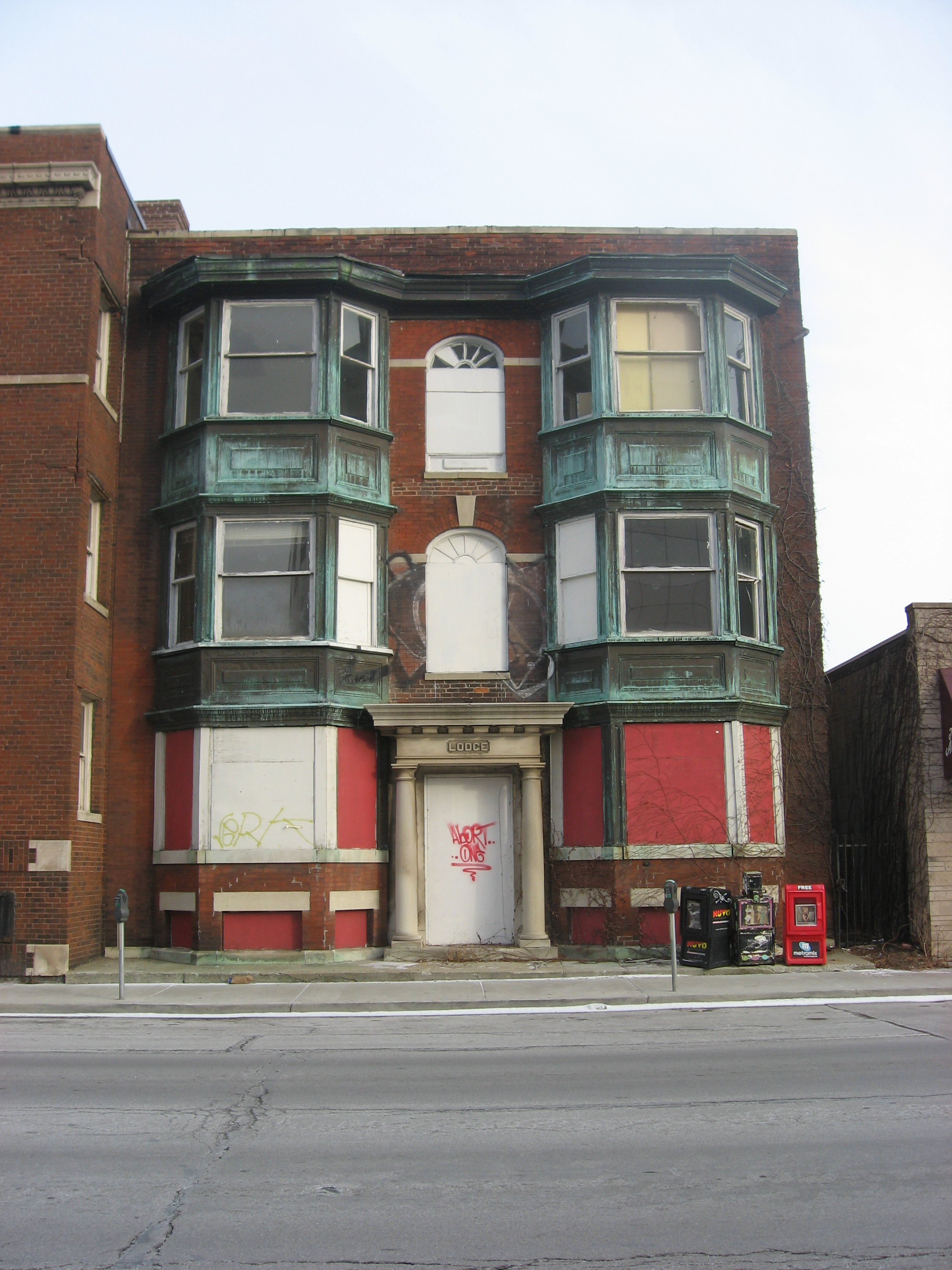
- The Lodge, January 2010

- Location within Indianapolis Location within Indiana Location within the United States
- Location: 829 N. Pennsylvania St., Indianapolis, Indiana
- Coordinates: 39°46′43″N 86°9′20″W
- Area: less than one acre
- Built: 1905
- Architectural style: Georgian Revival
- MPS: Apartments and Flats of Downtown Indianapolis TR
- NRHP reference No.: 83000073
- Added to NRHP: September 15, 1983

The Lodge is a historic apartment building located at Indianapolis, Indiana. It was built in 1905, and is a three-story, three-bay, rectangular, Georgian Revival style red brick building. It features a limestone entrance portico with Ionic order columns and three-story bay windows.

It was listed on the National Register of Historic Places in 1983.

== See also ==
- Apartments and Flats of Downtown Indianapolis Thematic Resources
- National Register of Historic Places listings in Center Township, Marion County, Indiana
