= The Ambassador (Indianapolis, Indiana) =

- Ambassador
- U.S. National Register of Historic Places
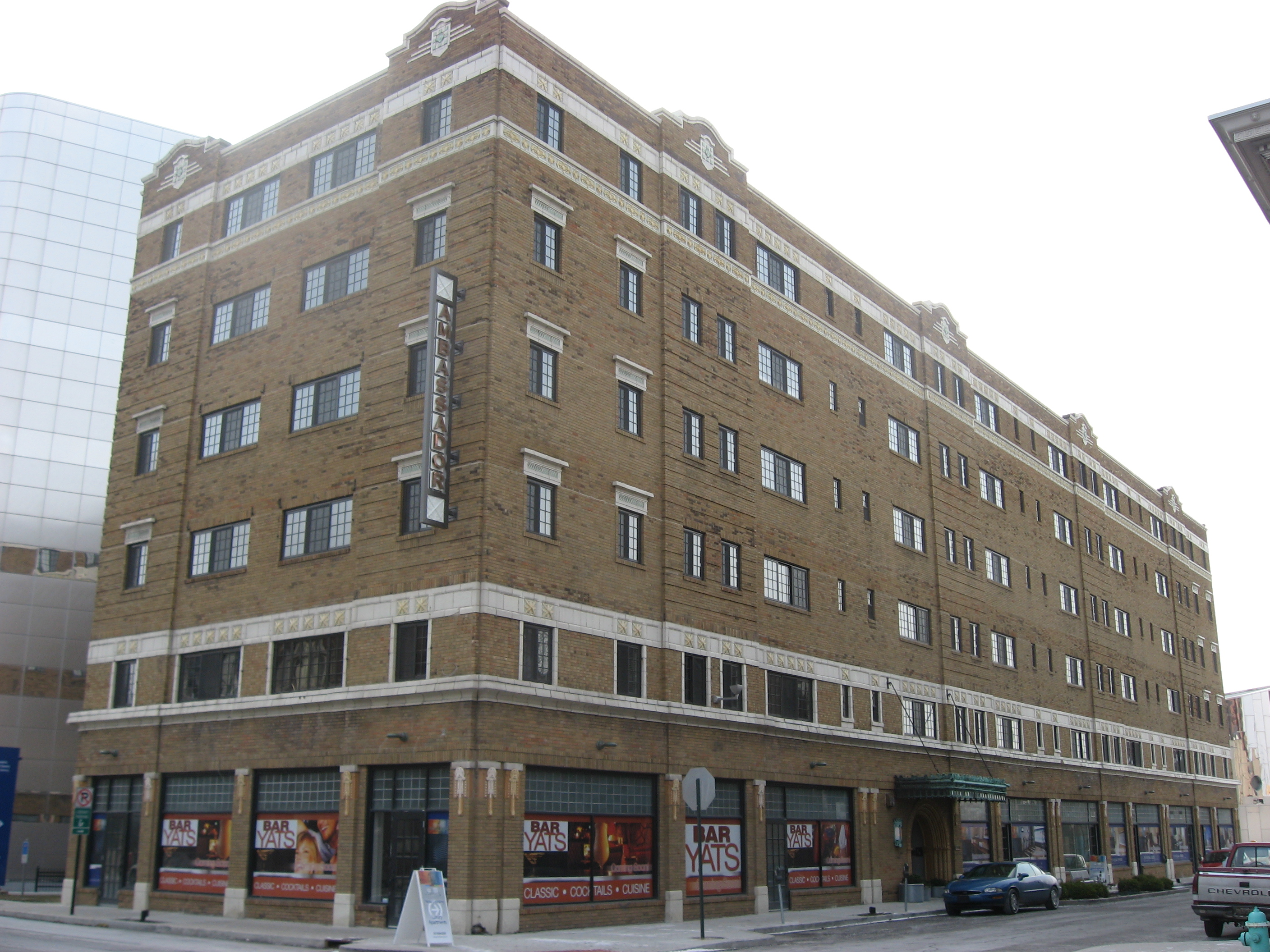
- The Ambassador, January 2010

- Location within Indianapolis Location within Indianapolis Location within Indiana Location within the United States
- Location: 39 E. 9th St., Indianapolis, Indiana
- Coordinates: 39°46′44″N 86°9′21″W
- Area: less than one acre
- Built: 1924
- Architectural style: Chicago
- MPS: Apartments and Flats of Downtown Indianapolis TR
- NRHP reference No.: 83000054
- Added to NRHP: September 15, 1983

The Ambassador is a historic apartment building located at Indianapolis, Indiana. It was built in 1924, and is a large six-story, tan cinder brick building. The first floor has Chicago school style commercial storefronts. It has a recessed entrance with detailed metal canopy and features Sullivanesque terra cotta ornamental detailing.

It was listed on the National Register of Historic Places in 1983.

== See also ==
- Apartments and Flats of Downtown Indianapolis Thematic Resources
- National Register of Historic Places listings in Center Township, Marion County, Indiana
