= The Oxford (Indianapolis, Indiana) =

- Oxford
- U.S. National Register of Historic Places
- U.S. Historic district – Contributing property
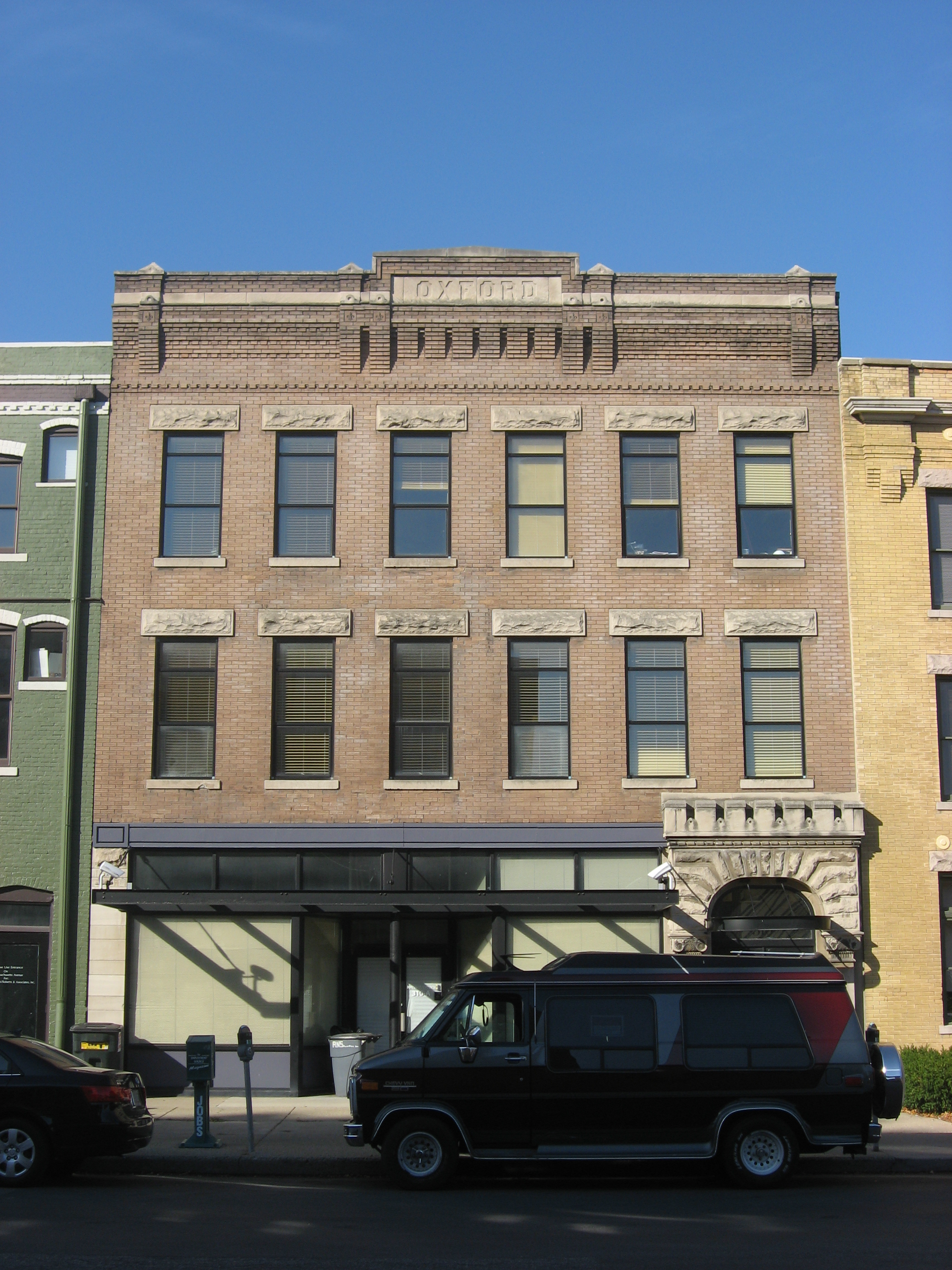
- The Oxford, October 2010

- Location within Indianapolis Location within Indianapolis Location within Indiana Location within the United States
- Location: 316 E. Vermont St., Indianapolis, Indiana
- Coordinates: 39°46′22″N 86°9′6″W
- Area: less than one acre
- Built: 1902
- Architect: Moore, C.F.
- MPS: Apartments and Flats of Downtown Indianapolis TR
- NRHP reference No.: 83000081
- Added to NRHP: September 15, 1983

The Oxford is a historic apartment building located at Indianapolis, Indiana. It was built in 1902, and is a three-story, six bay by ten bay, orange brick and limestone building. The entrance features a semi-elliptical rusticated voussoir arch with two Ionic order pilasters.

It was listed on the National Register of Historic Places in 1983. It is located in the Massachusetts Avenue Commercial District.

== See also ==
- Apartments and Flats of Downtown Indianapolis Thematic Resources
- National Register of Historic Places listings in Center Township, Marion County, Indiana
