= Wildstyle Paschall =

American visual artist

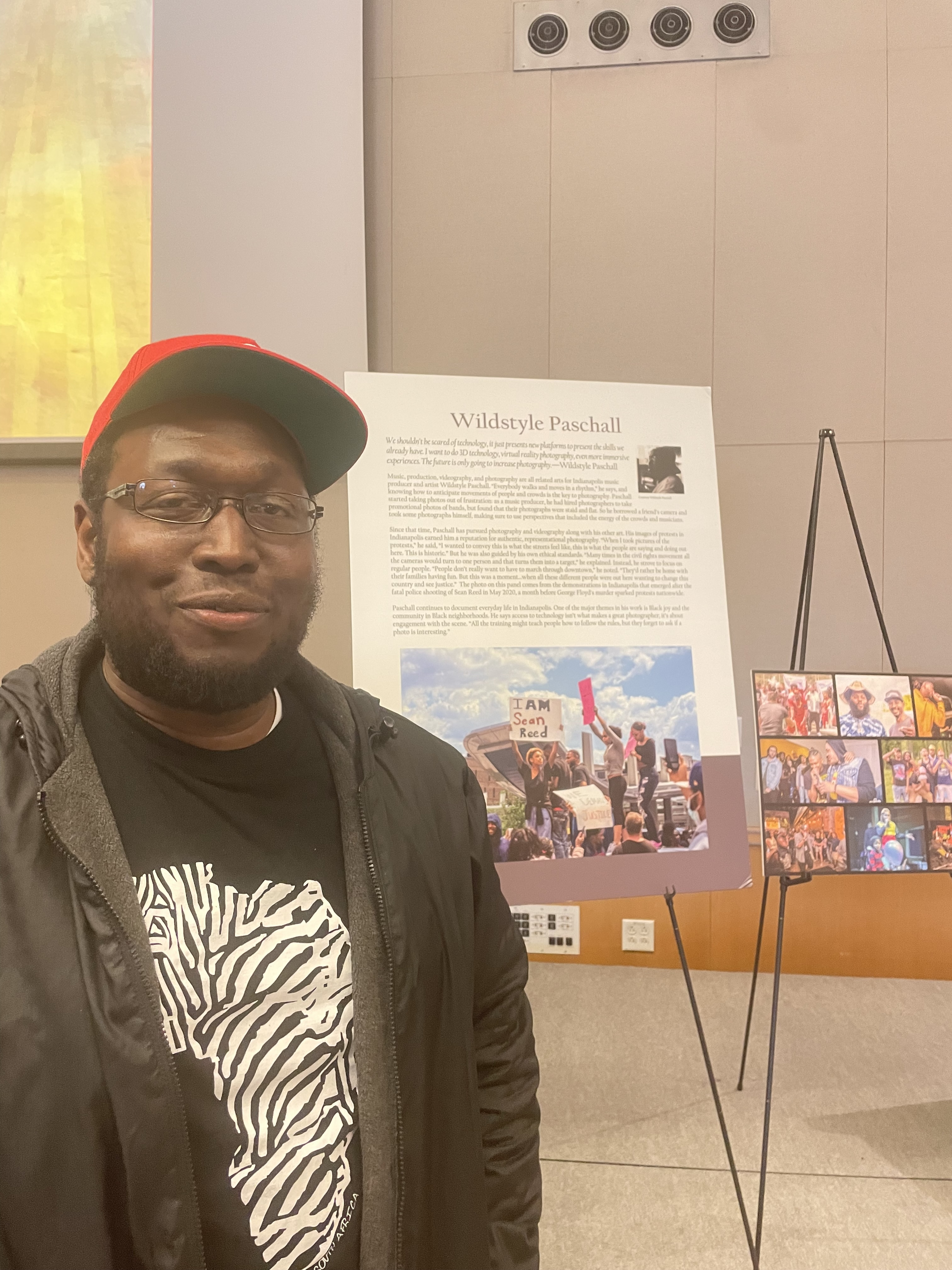
- Born: Keith Paschall; Indianapolis, IN
- Known for: Multimedia Installation art

Wildstyle Paschall is a visual artist, producer, musician, author and activist.

== Early life and education ==
Wildstyle Paschall (Keith Paschall) was born in 1981 at Methodist Hospital in Indianapolis, IN. He grew up partially on the Northwest side and eventually the Far Eastside of Indianapolis. He attended Warren High School, where he had the introduction to his musical talent by playing viola in the school's orchestra.

== Career ==
=== Music ===
Paschall was introduced to the MTV Music Generator for PlayStation in 2001, by one of his friends who was a DJ.

=== Photography ===
Paschall's work in photography encompasses social justice, Hip Hop and the Indy roller skating scene. In 2020, Paschall's photography was displayed in a photo exhibition hosted by the Indianapolis International Airport. Paschall was one of four contemporary photographers featured in the Changing Views: The Photography of Dorothea Lange exhibit at the Eiteljorg Museum.

His photography started gaining traction and soon it expanded into community photography which captured Indianapolis culture. In 2015, his photography entered the social justice landscape. In 2020 Paschall photographed the mass protests that occurred in Indianapolis, in the aftermath of the deaths of George Floyd and Dreasjon Reed. In 2023 these photographs were included in the "Changing Views" exhibit which featured Dorothea Lange at the Eiteljorg Museum.

=== Activism ===
Paschall's work encompasses activism in the social justice space but he is also involved as a community organizer and community advocate for various causes. Paschall is a Riverside resident who has been outspoken about the impact of gentrification on the neighborhood and the overall housing crisis. The Riverside neighborhood experienced a rise in property taxes from 2010 to 2020, which created a housing crisis for long time residents who were no longer able to afford to live there. In 2018, Paschall joined the Central Indiana Community Foundation. In his role in the Indianapolis Foundation's Community Ambassador's program, he advocates for marginalized communities and bridges the gap between these communities and businesses by forging authentic relationships. He contributes writing and research for the national organization, New America.

In 2023, the Newfields museum faced controversy after an unexpected resignation of their CEO and five board members also stepping down without clear transparency to their patrons and community. The Liberation Center organized a protest, and Paschall stood in solidarity with the protesters while he spoke about the lack of transparency from the museum in the midst of the resignations.

== Selected exhibits ==
- Changing Views: The Photography of Dorothea Lange. Eiteljorg Museum. Indianapolis, IN. March 4 – August 6, 2024.
- Identify. Spirit and Place Festival. Indianapolis, IN. November 2–12, 2023.
- Indy Hip Hop Music. Indianapolis International Airport. Indianapolis, IN. November 12, 2019 – March 15, 2020
