= The Idle =

Park in Indianapolis, Indiana, US

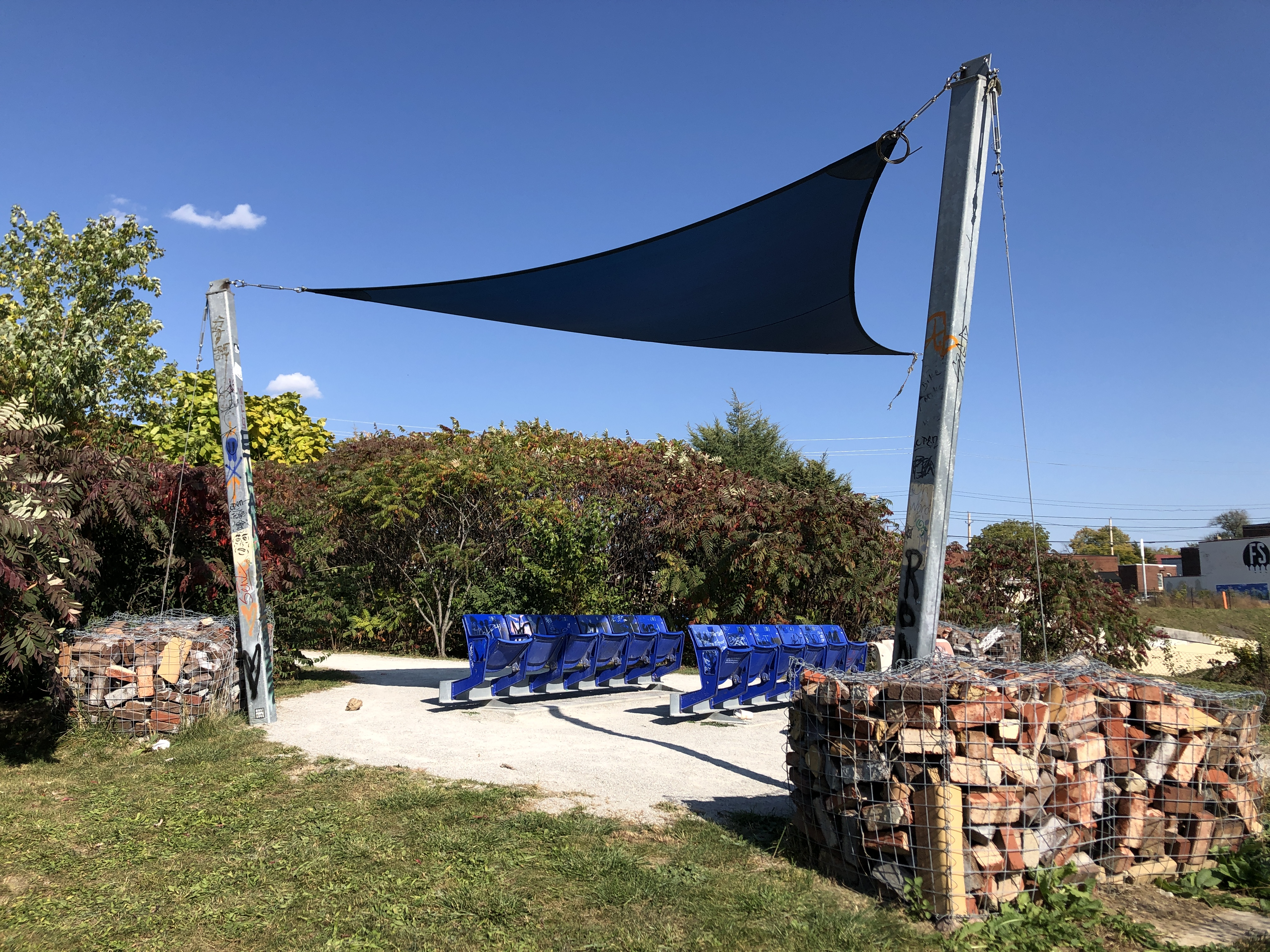
- The Idle in 2022

- Location within Indianapolis Location within Indiana Location within the United States
- Type: Urban park
- Motto: "The Idle - A Point of View"
- Location: Fletcher Place and Fountain Square, Indianapolis
- Coordinates: 39°45′20″N 86°08′38″W
- Opened: September 2018
- Founder: Tom Battista
- Operator: Indianapolis Beautiful, Inc.
- Cost: $89,462
- Website: www.idleindy.com

The Idle is a public park overlooking the I-65 and I-70 interstate interchanges in Indianapolis, Indiana. The park is located right off the Indianapolis Cultural Trail on Virginia Avenue, directly in-between the city's Fletcher Place and Fountain Square neighborhoods, which themselves are geographically separated by I-65.

The concept behind The Idle was conceived in 2013, through the vision of Tom Battista, a local Indianapolis property developer and entrepreneur. It was partially funded through Patronicity, a crowdfunding website which raised $48,462. Through a match, the Indiana Housing and Community Development Authority had contributed an additional $41,000. Since the park is located on federal highway land, its creation required cooperation between the Federal Highway Administration, the Indiana Department of Transportation, and the Indianapolis Department of Public Works.

The park features an accessible limestone trail leading to a viewing platform, which is furnished with seats salvaged from the city's former Bush Stadium. It also features native vegetation, repurposed ash tree benches, as well as informative signage explaining the area's history and concept behind the project.

== See also ==
- List of parks in Indianapolis
- The 606, urban park in Chicago, Illinois
- High Line, similar project in New York City
