= Fountain Square, Indianapolis =

Neighborhood and cultural district in Indianapolis, Indiana, US

Fountain Square
- Indianapolis Cultural District
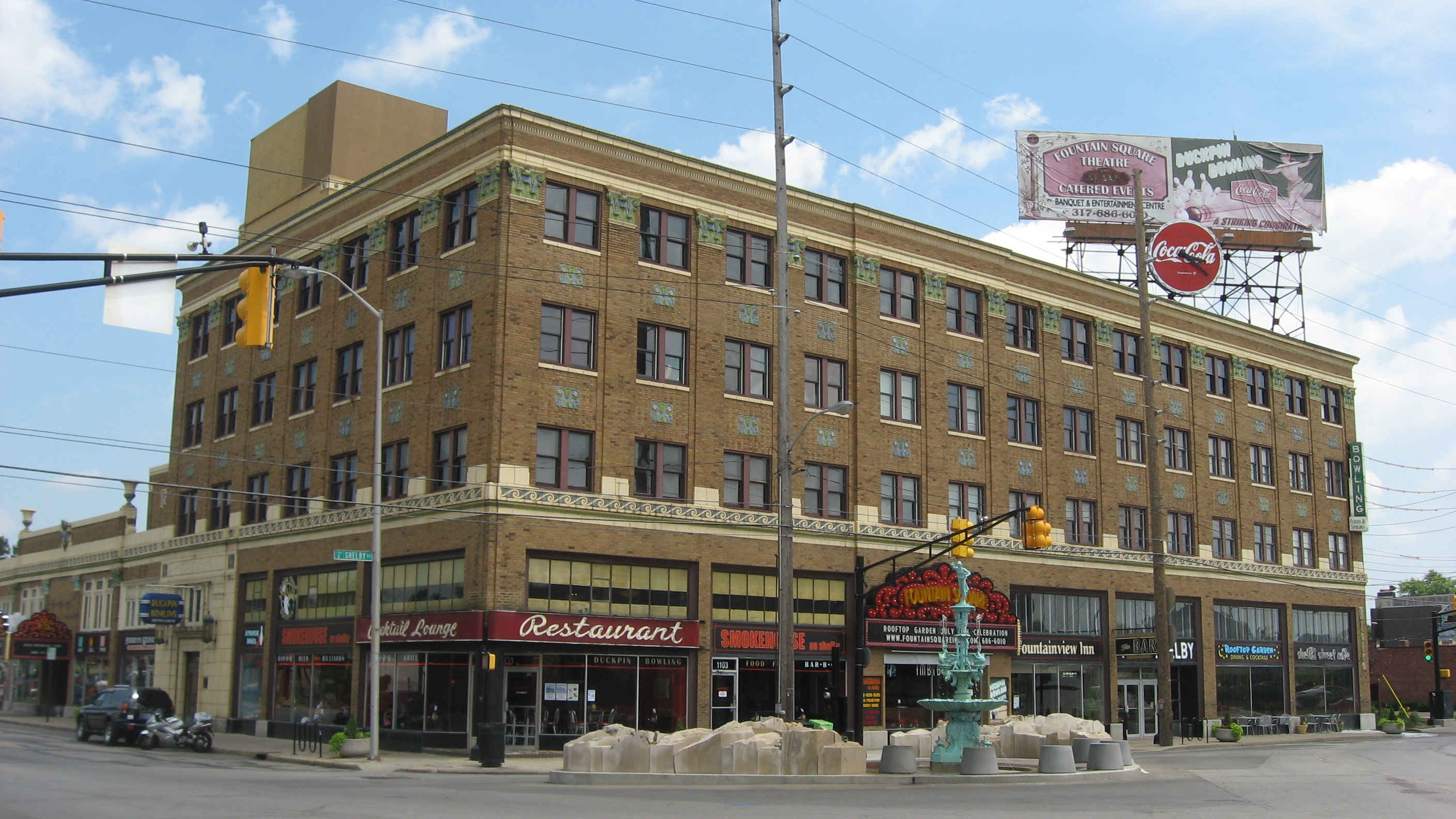
- Fountain Square Theatre and Lady Spray Fountain, July 2011

- Flag Logo
- Motto: Anything but square
- Location within Indianapolis Location within Indiana Location within the United States
- Coordinates: 39°45′8″N 86°8′24″W
- Country: United States
- State: Indiana
- County: Marion
- Settled: 1835
- Historic district: 1983

Government
  - Councillors: Kristin Jones (D-18); Frank Mascari (D-19)

Population
  - Estimate (2020): 9,839
- Time zone: UTC-5 (Eastern (EST))
  - Summer (DST): UTC-4 (EDT)
- Zip code: 46203
- Website: Fountain Fletcher District

Fountain Square (abbreviated as FSQ) is a neighborhood and designated cultural district in Indianapolis, Indiana, United States. Located approximately 1 1/2 miles (2.4 km) southeast of downtown Indianapolis, Fountain Square is home to three designated national historic districts, the Laurel and Prospect, the State and Prospect, and the Virginia Avenue districts, all of which were listed on the National Register of Historic Places in 1983. The neighborhood derives its name from the successive fountains that have been prominently featured at the intersection of Virginia Avenue, East Prospect Street, and Shelby Street.

Fountain Square is the first commercial historic district in Indiana, and it is the only portion of the city outside the initial mile square that has continually operated as a recognized commercial area since the 1870s. Its significance is not only as an early commercial district, but additionally as one developed and dominated by German-American immigrants, merchants, and entrepreneurs, who established a strong German character on the city's southside. From the 1920s to the 1950s, Fountain Square was the city's main entertainment district, with as many as seven theaters in operation at one point in time.

In the late 1960s and early 1970s, a large swath of Fountain Square was demolished to complete the Interstate Highway System in Indianapolis, leaving the remaining neighborhood disconnected from the surrounding area. After decades of population decline, the neighborhood is estimated to have 9,839 inhabitants. Historic preservation efforts began in the late 1990s, and the neighborhood slowly re-emerged as a vibrant commercial center. Today, Fountain Square is widely considered to be Indianapolis's newest trendy neighborhood, with an eclectic mix of retro architecture and modern, urban design.

== Geography ==
Although Fountain Square is not officially delineated, the Fountain Square Neighborhood Association's service area is bounded to the north by the railroad tracks north of Deloss Street, to the east by State Street, to the south by Pleasant Run Parkway, and to the west by I-65. It is located 1.5 miles (2.4 km) southeast of downtown Indianapolis, and covers an area of approximately 1 square mile (2.6 km^{2}). Little remains of the original geographic features of the land.

Fountain Square bases a portion its street pattern due to a continuation of the diagonal Virginia Avenue, which came about from the 1821 Ralston Plan for the new city of Indianapolis. The neighborhood is bordered upon by Bates–Hendricks to the southwest, Fletcher Place to the northwest, and Holy Cross neighborhood to the north. Within its boundaries, it houses the Laurel and Prospect, State and Prospect, and the Virginia Avenue historic districts.

== History ==
=== Early settlement ===
Prior to the arrival of Fountain Square's modern-day inhabitants, the area was inhabited by the Delaware people, who settled there after they were pushed out of their homeland along the Delaware River watershed. After the Treaty of St. Mary's was signed on October 3, 1818, the Delaware ceded their lands in Indiana, which included a camp site at Pleasant Run, near Fountain Square's modern-day southern boundary. By 1820, the Delaware people were gone.

The intersection of Virginia Avenue, Prospect, and Dillon (now Shelby) Streets in Indianapolis in 1876

In 1835, Calvin Fletcher, a banker, farmer and Indiana state senator, purchased a 264-acre (107 ha) farm with Nicholas McCarty, with the intent to "sell the small parcels for a 'handsome advance'". While the early settlement was sparsely populated and primarily residential, the areas surrounding modern-day Fountain Square saw an influx of immigrants, particularly the Irish, who settled near the railroad tracks on South Street. Eventually, this area became known as "Irish Hill".

During the 1860s, the Virginia Avenue corridor began to emerge as the southside's commercial district. During the Civil War, the 28th Colored Infantry Regiment, which was the only black regiment formed in Indiana, trained at a wooded area at Indianapolis's Camp Fremont, on land owned by Calvin Fletcher. It included 518 enlisted men who signed on for three years of service.

In 1864, the Citizen's Street Railway Company extended their mule-drawn streetcar down to the intersection of Virginia Avenue with Shelby and Prospect Streets, since the construction of the city's Union Station and its multiple railroad lines had cut the area off from the downtown district. With the location of the streetcar turnaround, local residents nicknamed the neighborhood as "The End".

The years following Fletcher's death saw rapid commercial growth for the neighborhood, beginning in the 1870s. This development is attributed to the large number of German immigrants settling in the area, which helped to develop Fountain Square's distinctly German character. By 1870, Virginia Avenue was a bustling part of Indianapolis. Due to the rapid growth in population, the area was platted eight times from 1870 to 1873. By 1880, single-family houses made up most of the lots off Virginia Avenue, although they were to be replaced by larger, commercial buildings in the following years. In 1889, the first fountain was constructed, giving Fountain Square its name. It was placed because a group of businessmen thought that "if they built a fountain, then maybe the farmers would stop and do business while they watered their animals."

=== Continued growth ===
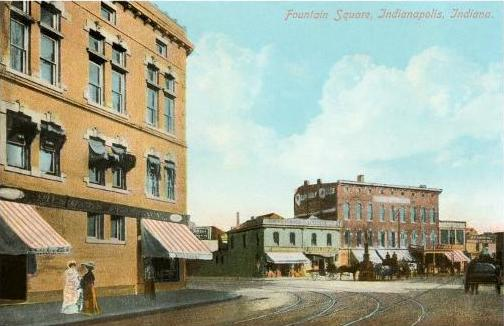
Postcard of the early 20th century depicting Fountain Square's streetcar rails, prior to the construction of the Fountain Square Theatre

Near the turn of the 20th century, Fountain Square saw an influx of many Eastern and Southern European immigrants moving into the neighborhood. Fountain Square enjoyed continued growth as the southside's primary commercial district. The opening of the Fountain Square State Bank (1909), the Fountain Square Post Office (1927), Havercamp and Dirk's Grocery (1905), Koehring & Son Warehouse (1900), the Fountain Square branch of the Standard Grocery Company (1927), the Frank E. Reeser Company (1904), Wiese-Wenzel Pharmacy (1905), the Sommer-Roempke Bakery (1909), the Fountain Square Hardware Company (1912), Horuff & Son Shoe Store (1911), Jessie Hartman Milliners (1908), the William H. and Fiora Young Redman Wallpaper and Interior Design business (1923), the Charles F. Iske Furniture Store (1910), The Fountain Block Commercial Building (1902), and the G. C. Murphy Company (1929), are examples of this phenomenon.

In the early 1900s, Fountain Square's May Day celebration brought huge crowds into the neighborhood from all over the city to watch the parade and witness the festivities in nearby Garfield Park.

One of the first trading centers outside of the Mile Square—some South Siders say the very first—developed here. The sons of merchants who were "on the fountain" before World War I maintain the family business, serving a new generation of families 'by the fountain.' — Gene Gladson, Indianapolis Theatres from A to Z, 1976

Following years of growth and expansion, the neighborhood's population reached an estimated 26,285 by 1930. During World War II, Fountain Square experienced an influx of Appalachian settlers coming in from Kentucky and Tennessee, who had moved to the city by the lure of the war industries that were operating in Indianapolis. At that time, the majority of the population belonged to the white working-class, without a college education. By 1950, Fountain Square's population had peaked to an estimated 27,242. At this time, Fountain Square was considered "downtown" for the southside areas of the city, offering multiple entertainment venues, a wide range of retail, shopping, church, and social centers.

=== Decline ===
External videos
- Fountain Square c. 1950
- Indiana Historical Society - Indianapolis Water Works Collection

Historical estimates
Year	Pop.	±%
1930	26,285	—
1950	27,242	+3.6%
1970	19,736	−27.6%
1980	15,941	−19.2%
1990	13,903	−12.8%
2020	9,839	−29.2%
Source: The Polis Center, IUPUI

However, the next decade saw the beginning of Fountain Square's demise, as newer more modern developments further south took over Fountain Square's role as the southside's commercial district. The closing of all of the theaters exacerbated its economic and cultural demise. Symbolically, the fountain from which Fountain Square received its name was removed in 1954 due to traffic concerns, to be returned in 1969 during a wave of revitalization efforts.

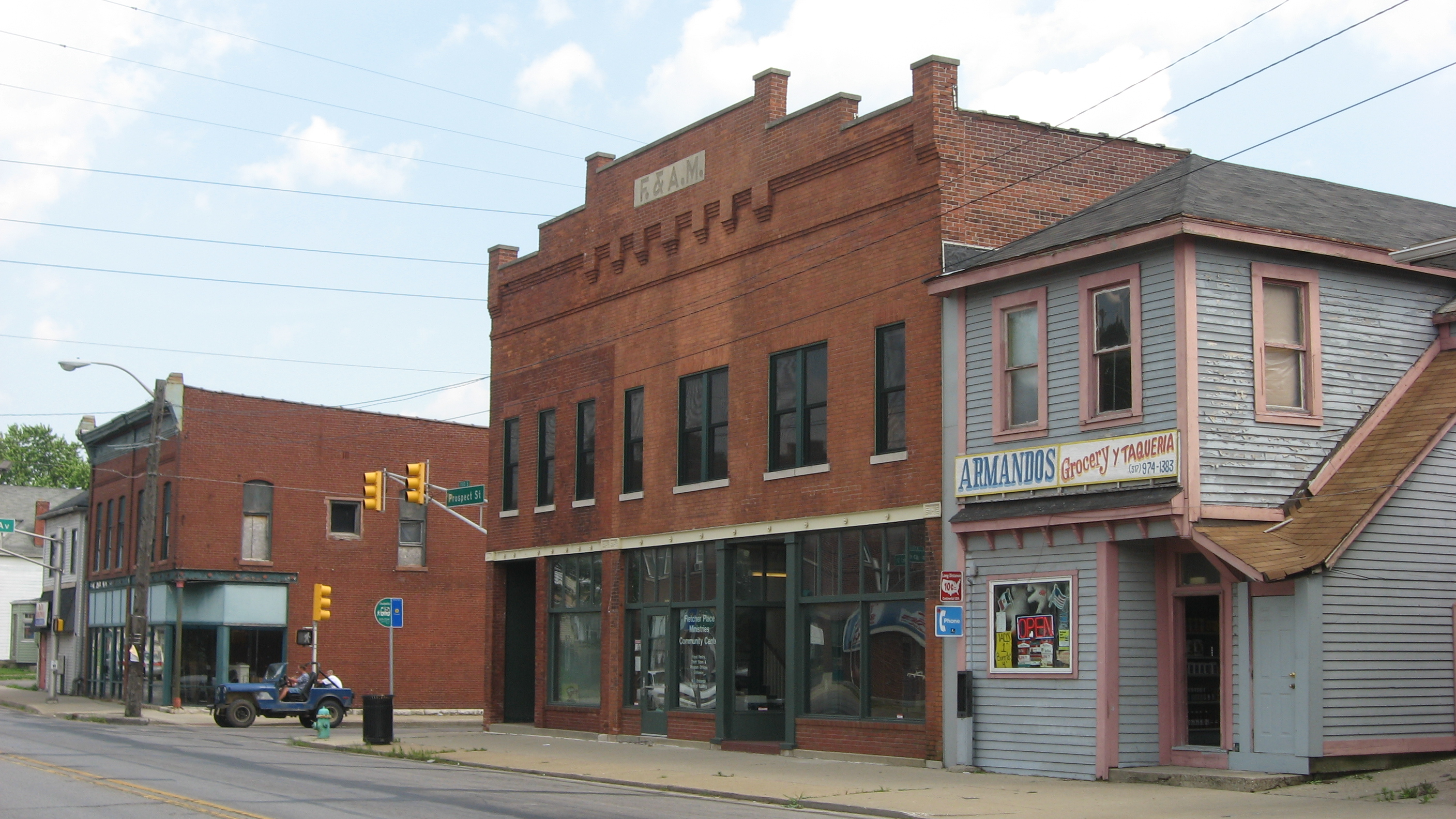
The State and Prospect District, among two others located within Fountain Square, was recognized as a historic district in 1983.

During the 1960s, Indianapolis, along with the rest of the United States, experienced a great amount of societal upheaval, exacerbated by white flight after construction of the Interstate Highway System enabled many Americans to leave their industrial cities for new housing and shopping options in the suburbs. In particular, the construction of the I-65 and I-70 interchanges from 1968 to 1971 had a negative effect on Fountain Square's population totals, as many of the neighborhood's multi-level flats and apartments were cleared to make way for the highway. In all, over 17,000 residents were displaced from the downtown areas, 6,000 of which came from Fountain Square itself, totaling 25 percent of the neighborhood's population.

In effect, this had cut Fountain Square's inhabitants off from downtown's social services and the adjacent neighborhoods, further exacerbating its population decline. By 1970, its population was an estimated 19,736, a decline of over 24 percent compared to the previous decade. At that time, the minority population had risen to 6 percent. For the next few decades, Fountain Square's population continued to decline, to 15,941 in 1980—a drop of almost 20 percent as compared to 1970 levels.

=== Revitalization ===
Between 1980 and 1982, more than $3 million was invested in Fountain Square. In 1983, three historic districts within Fountain Square were placed on the National Register of Historic Places, spurring a wave of corporate support, city grants, and private donations. In 1984, the neighborhood was placed on the Indianapolis Historic Preservation Commission's list of adopted districts to focus on area rehabilitation. By 1990, the population had dropped to 13,903, including a minority population of about 6.66 percent.

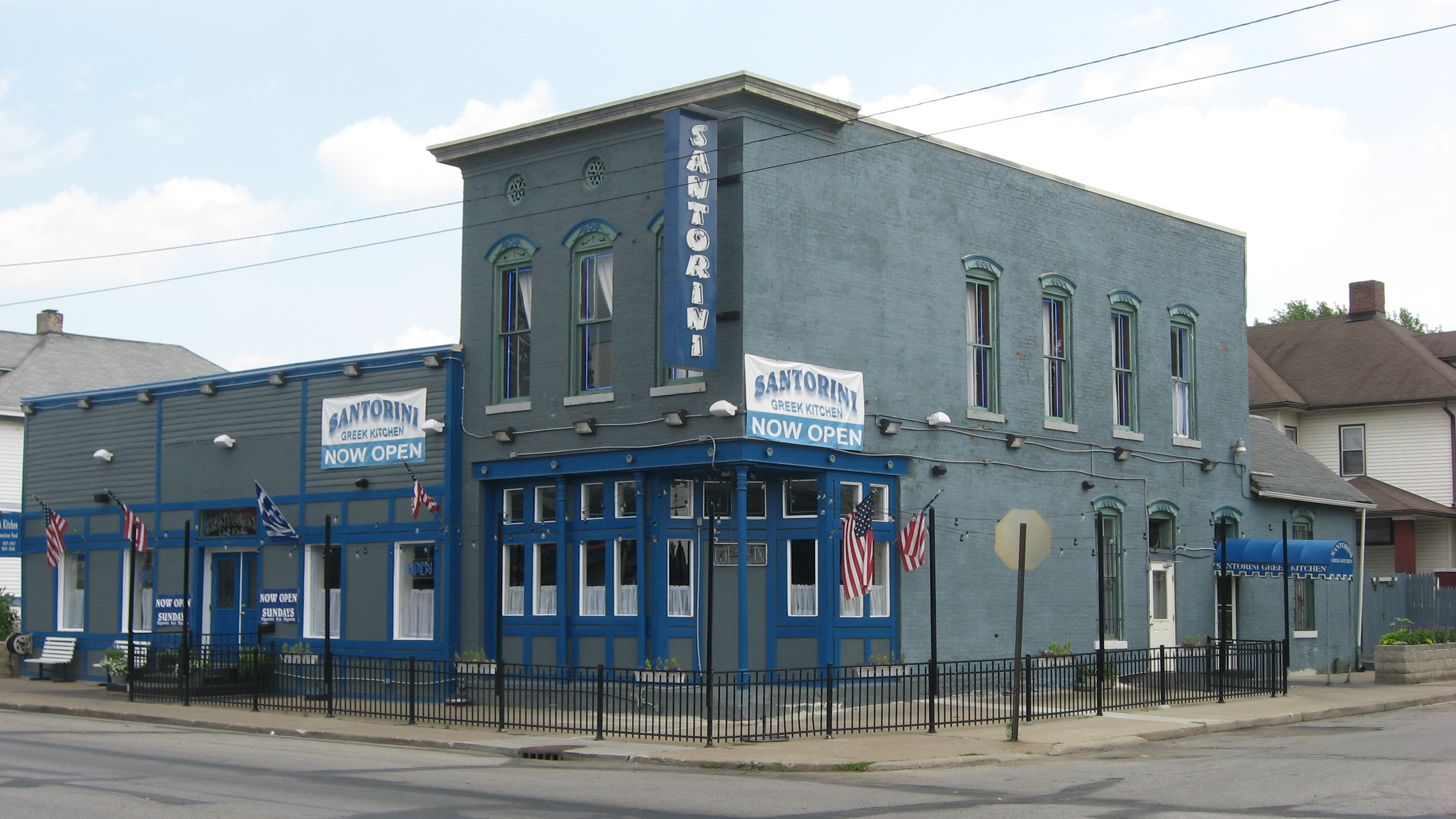
A revitalized building on Prospect Street now houses a local Greek restaurant.

In the 1990s, several neighborhood community organizations joined efforts to revitalize Fountain Square's former commercial center, resulting in the opening of several new restaurants, art galleries, retail and office places, and live entertainment venues. In 1993, local resident Linton Calvert, a local barber and former city bowling champion, helped spur the transformation of Fountain Square through his purchase and subsequent restoration of the mostly vacant Fountain Square Theatre building, which up until that point housed a furniture store. With his investment, the neighborhood benefited greatly, with reinvestment efforts that have continued up to this day. In 1999, Indianapolis recognized Fountain Square as one of the city's six cultural districts.

The designation of Fountain Square as one of Indianapolis's cultural districts has contributed to the neighborhood's rebirth. Additional factors that have helped to cement the neighborhood's revitalization efforts are its compact and walkable streetscapes, unique building architecture, three historic district designations, its proximity to downtown, and ease of access from the interstates. Upgrades to the neighborhood's streetscape, building rehabilitation, the construction of additional public spaces, and the placement of directional signs that visually define Fountain Square have also contributed to this process.

The neighborhood has been the scene of several home renovations on the television series Good Bones.

== Demographics ==
Because Fountain Square has not been delineated in past census counts, there are not any accurate population totals for the neighborhood. The neighborhood's population peaked at an estimated 27,242 in 1950; however, the population dropped dramatically since then, and current estimates have placed that number at around 9,839.

Demographic data for the neighborhood reveals a 72 percent increase of average home values from $47,000 in 2000 to $81,000 in 2013. During that same time period, average rent prices have increased 82 percent, from $439 to $798. The number of residents with college education has also increased, although poverty rates also increased and average income has declined. Recently, Fountain Square has witnessed the effects of gentrification, as the average family income has increased 47 percent from 2010 to 2016. Accordingly, the neighborhood's property values have increased, and the number of young professionals moving into the neighborhood has continued to climb.

== Transportation ==
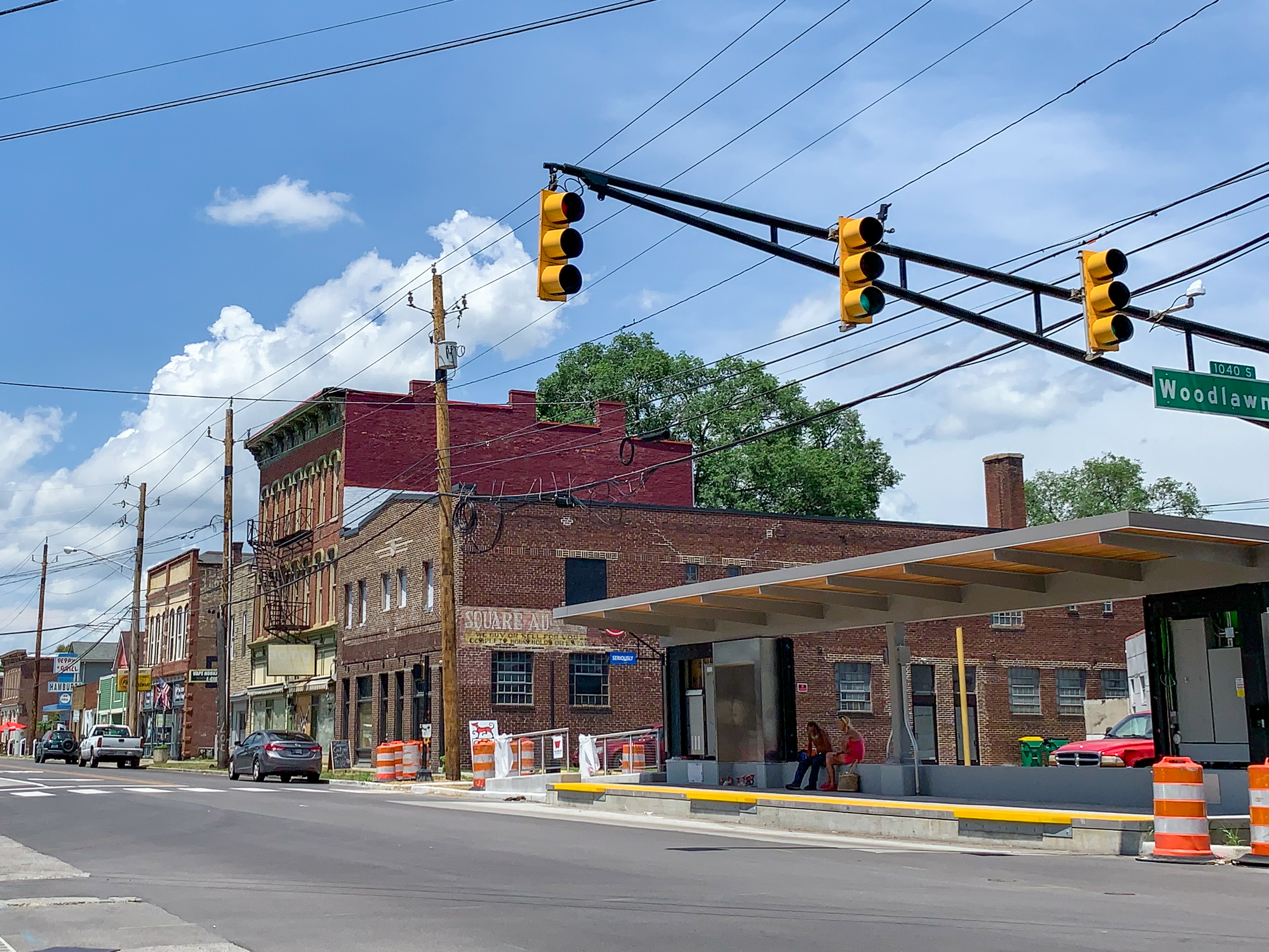
IndyGo's bus rapid transit Red Line stop under construction.

Fountain Square played an important role in the history and development of the city's transportation. Historically, it was the last stop on Indianapolis's Virginia Avenue streetcar line.

Today, Fountain Square is connected to IndyGo's bus rapid transit Red Line, which was opened in Summer 2019. Projected to carry 11,000 daily passengers, the Red Line is a 13.5-mile (21.7 km) north–south transit line that connects the neighborhood with downtown and the Broad Ripple commercial district. The neighborhood is also connected to downtown by the Indianapolis Cultural Trail, which is a multi-use trail that was inaugurated in 2013. An Indiana University Public Policy Institute report on the Cultural Trail estimated a $1 billion increase in property values along the route.

The Cultural Trail "healed the cut" that I-65/70s construction introduced, linking Fountain Square to downtown and other cultural districts and prioritizes landscape/ streetscape design elements. — Southeast Neighborhood Development Corporation

== Landmarks and businesses ==
Fountain Square is home to several notable landmarks and attractions:

- Fountain Square Theatre, which opened in 1928 as a 1,500 seat motion picture and vaudeville theater
- The Idle, an urban park overlooking the I-65 and I-70 highway interchange
- Indianapolis Cultural Trail, a 8.1-mile (13.0 km) multi-use trail connecting the neighborhood to downtown
- Indy Reads bookstore and literacy non-profit, at 1066 Virginia Avenue
- Keep Indianapolis Beautiful, a local affiliate of Keep America Beautiful; the headquarters are located at 1029 Fletcher Avenue
- Laurel and Prospect District, a historic district encompassing three buildings
- Murphy Arts Center, which houses local artists, a concert and events venue, and several restaurants
- State and Prospect District, a historic district encompassing eight buildings and one object
- Virginia Avenue District, a historic district encompassing 43 buildings and one structure
- Wheeler–Schebler Carburetor Company Building, Indianapolis's last automobile parts factory, listed as a historic building in 2004

=== Gallery ===
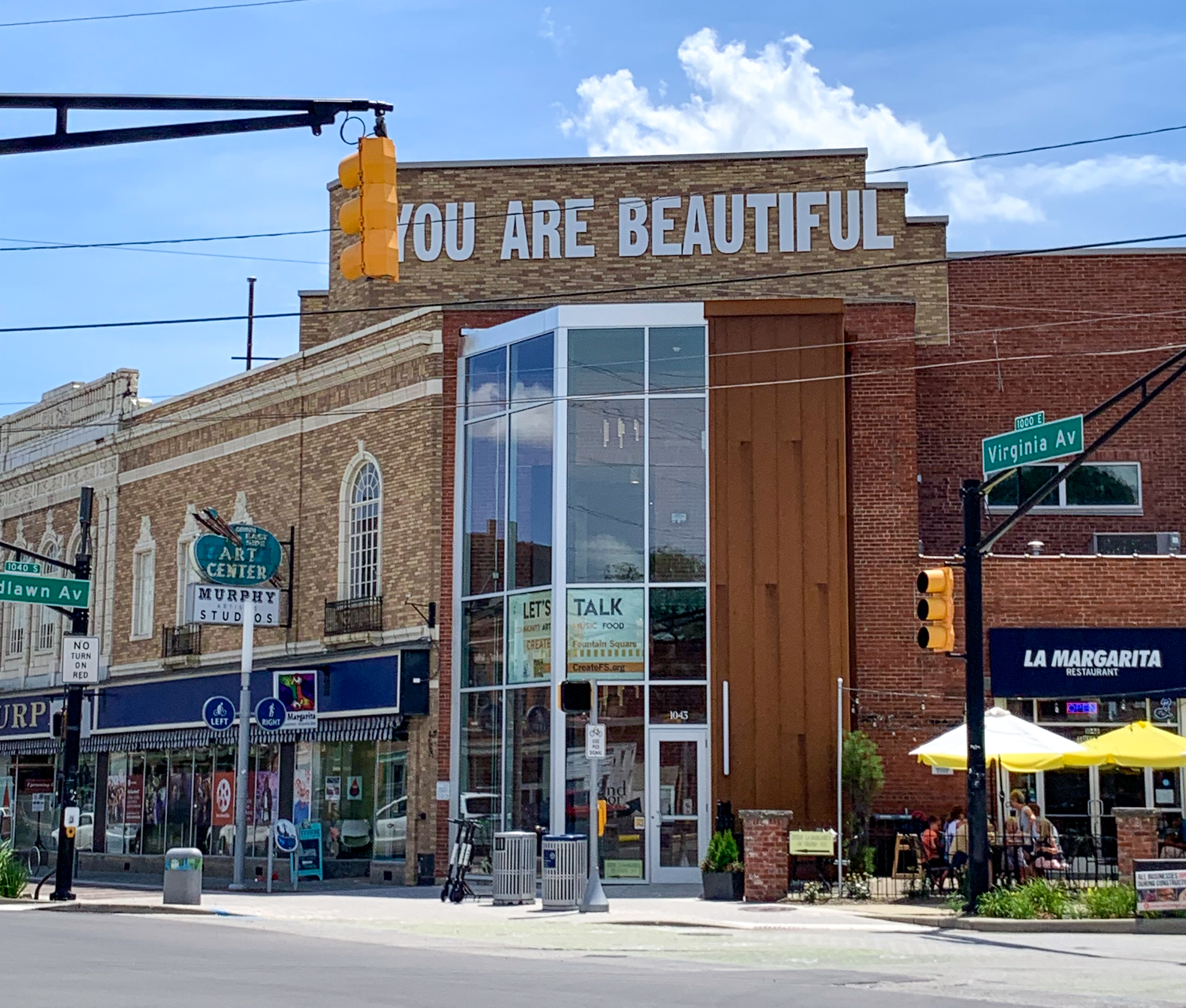
The G. C. Murphy Building, built in 1884

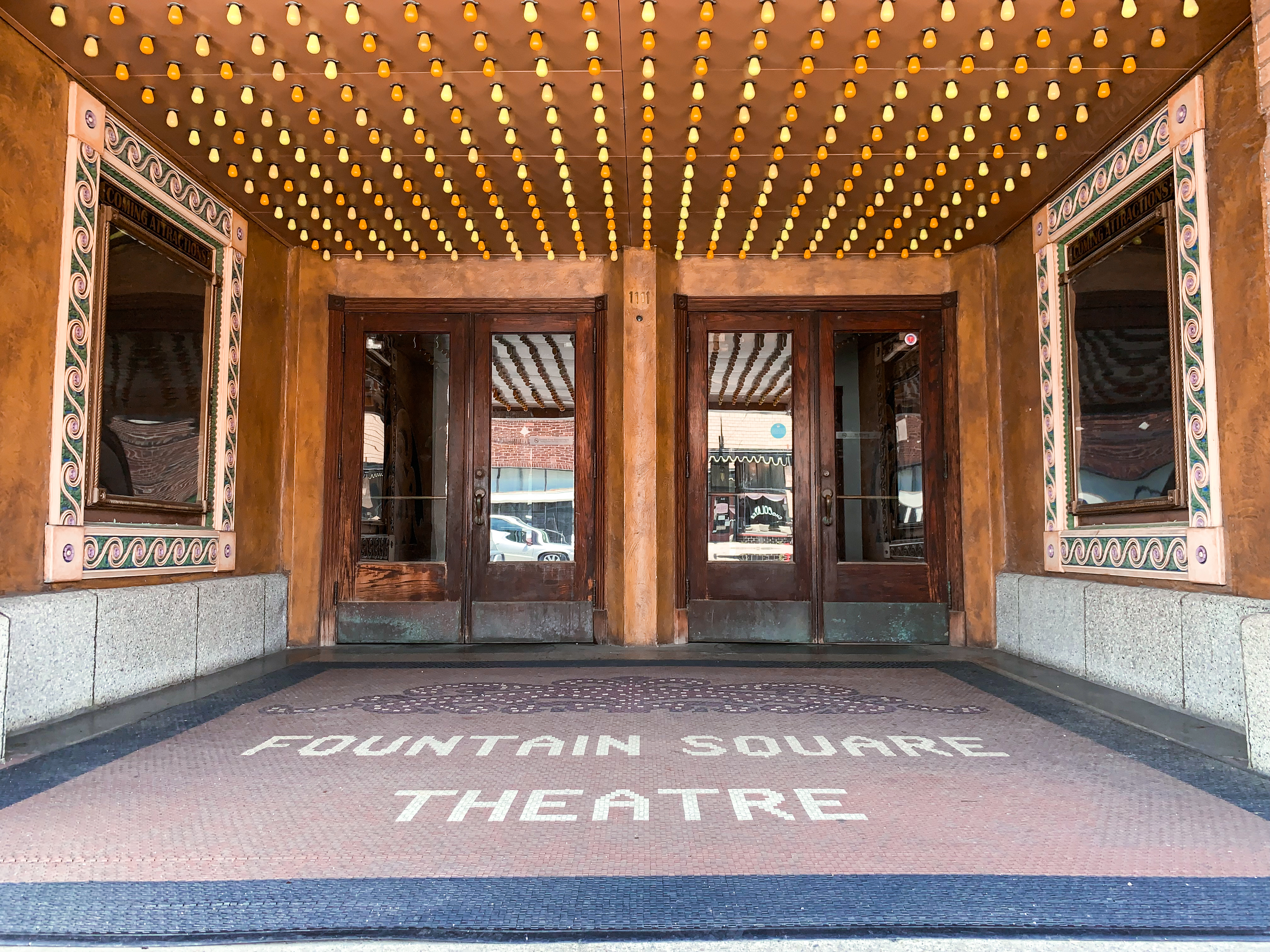
Fountain Square Theatre, built in 1928

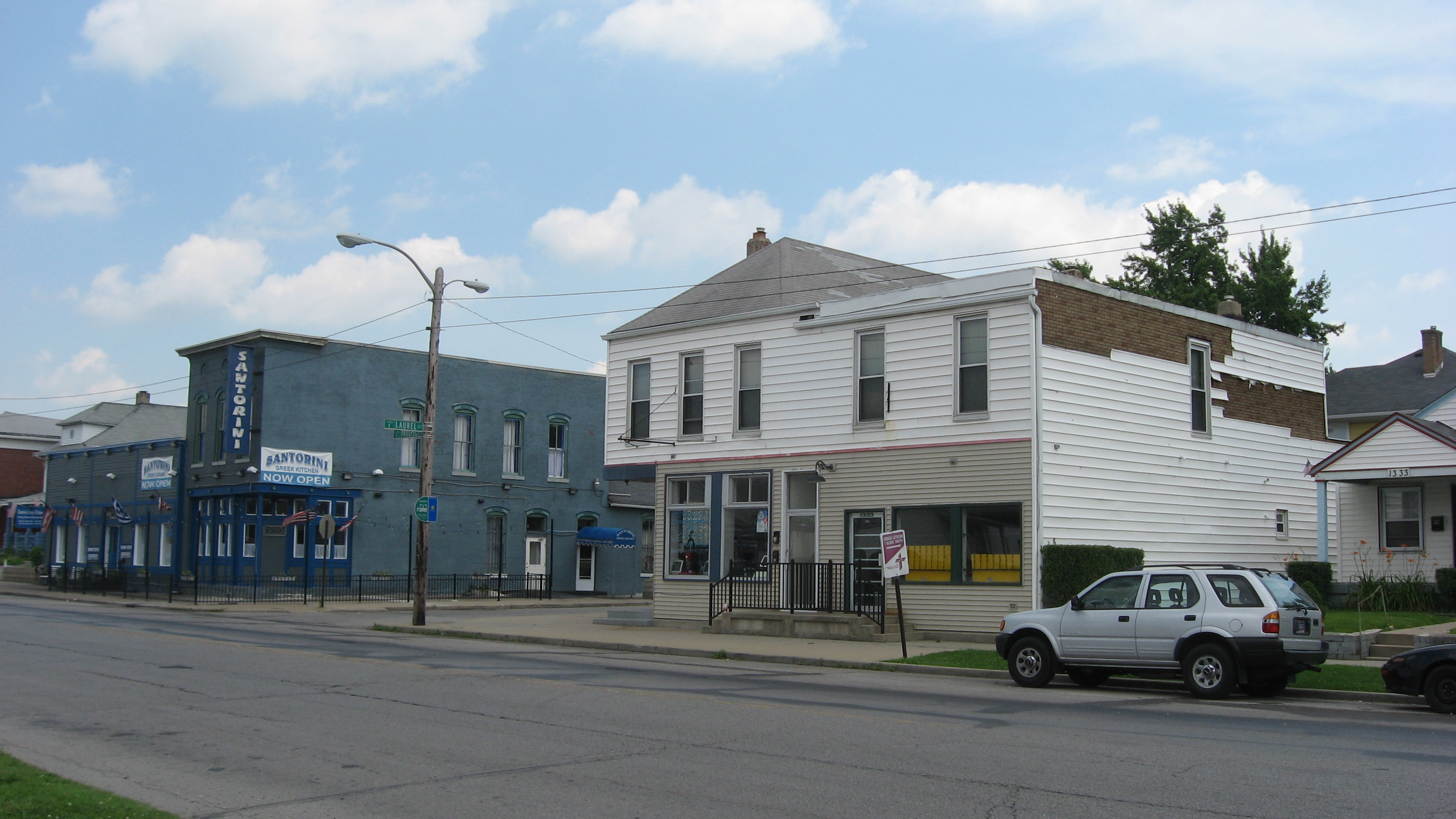
Laurel and Prospect historic district

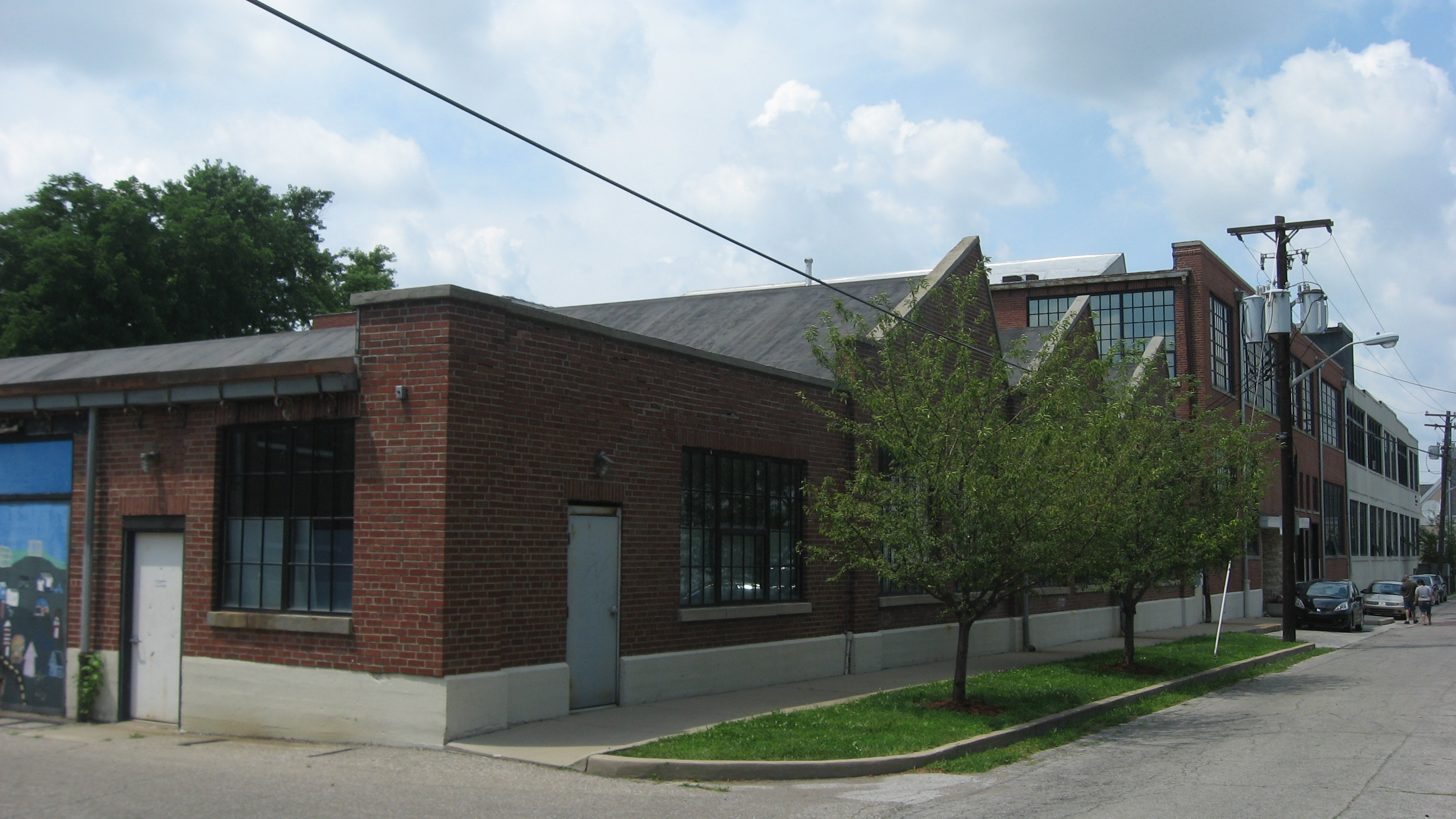
Wheeler–Schebler Carburetor Co., 1911

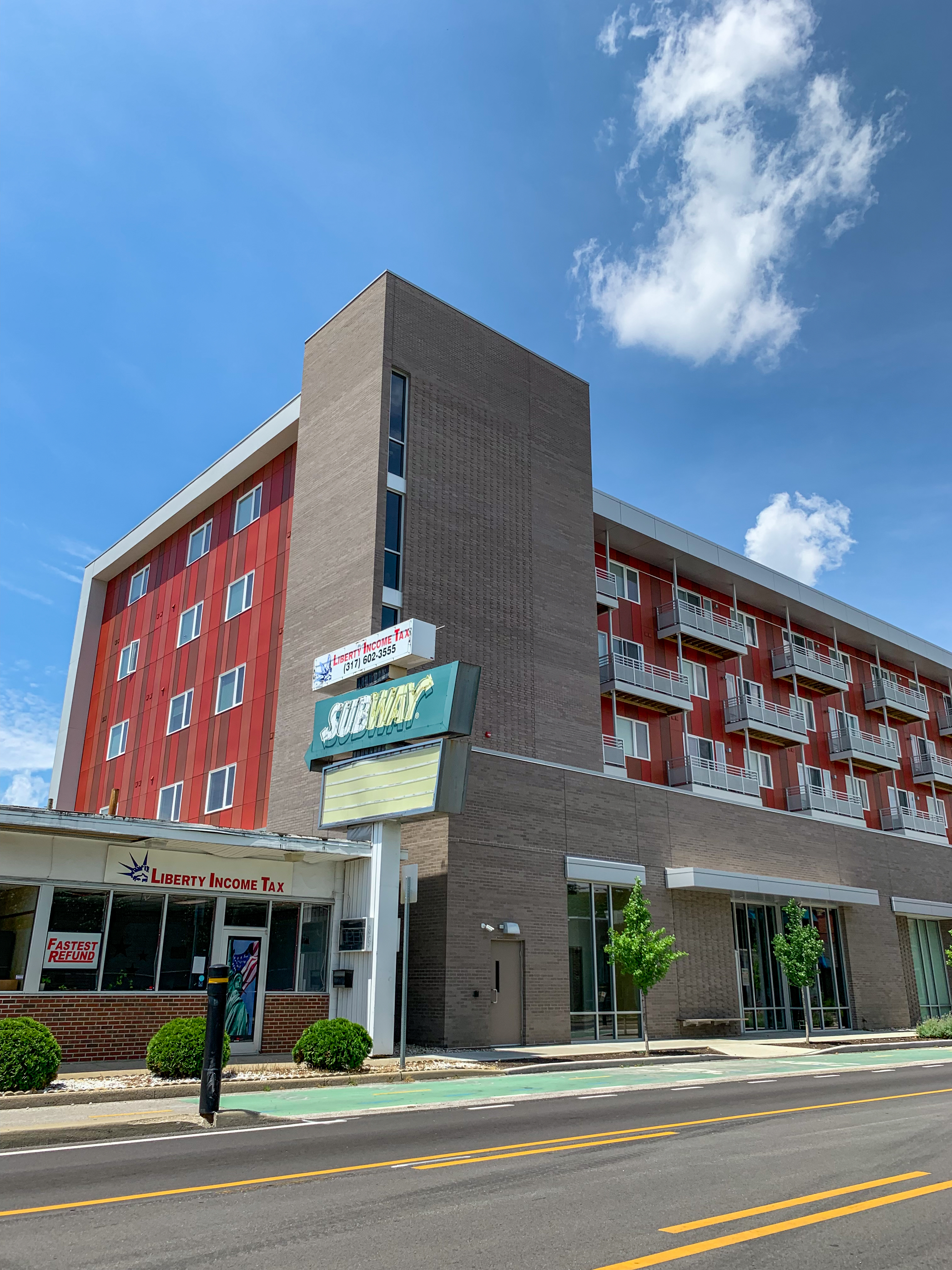
New development in Fountain Square

== In popular culture ==
Fountain Square is one of the main settings for HGTV's Good Bones, a cable TV series that features a mother and daughter who focus on revitalizing and rehabbing homes in the Fountain Square, Bates–Hendricks, and other neighborhoods.

== See also ==
- Indianapolis Cultural Districts
- List of neighborhoods in Indianapolis
