= Frank Baldwin Hunter =

American architect

- Born: June 17, 1883; Covington, Kentucky
- Died: January 5, 1958 (aged 74)
- Resting place: Crown Hill Cemetery and Arboretum
- Notable work: Lovel D. Millikan House and Fountain Square Theatre

Frank Baldwin Hunter (June 17, 1883-Jan. 5, 1958) was an architect and

pool designer in Indianapolis, Indiana. Part of his career was as the City Architect for Indianapolis.

Born in Covington, Kentucky, he moved to Indianapolis in 1889. He started his own practice in 1907. He had an office in the State Life Building. He designed residences, theaters, and a sanitarium.

Architect Edgar O. Hunter was his brother. Both brothers were members of the Commercial Club of Indianapolis. John H. Hunter, a traveling salesman in Indianapolis, was their father.

He patented a system for man-made beach pools.

He advertised himself as, "A designer of homes of distinction and beauty." He was pictured and quoted in an advertisement for Celotex insulation.

His wife was a music aficionado.

== Work ==
- Lovel D. Millikan House (1911) in Indianapolis
- St. James Courts Apartments (1919) Saint James Court
- 4343 North Meridian Street (1920), designed for William N. Thompson, president of Stutz Motor Car Company, it served as the residence of the Governor of Indiana from 1945 to 1973.
- Ambassador Apartments (The Ambassador (Indianapolis, Indiana)) (1924)
- Zaring Egyptian Theatre (1925) in Indianapolis Closed 1965.
- Fountain Square Theatre (1928) in Indianapolis
