= Colored Knights of Pythias Castle Hall =

- U.S. National Register of Historic Places
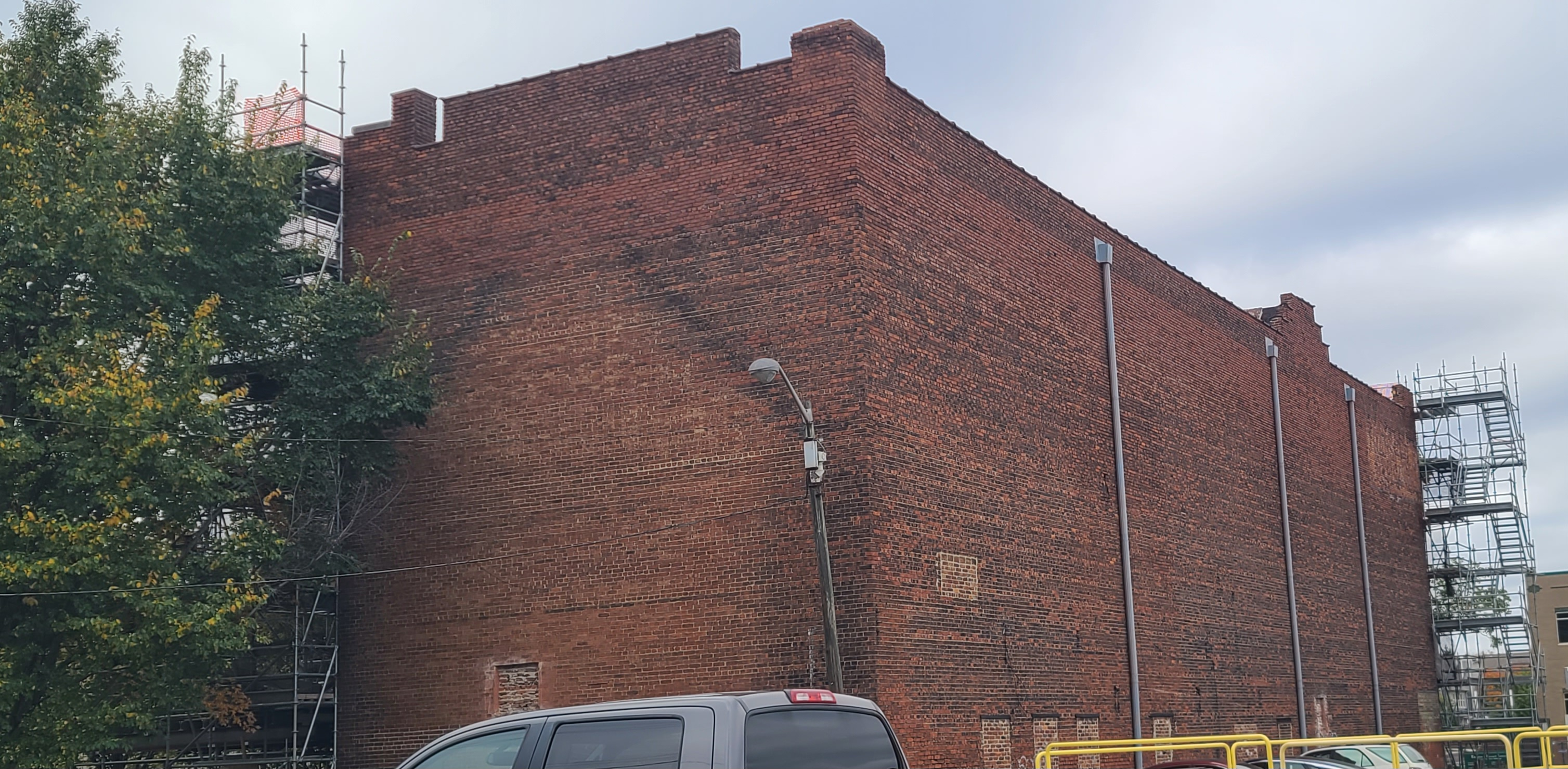
- Rear view of the historic Colored Knights of Pythias Castle Hall with construction scaffolding visible.

- Location within Indianapolis Location within Indianapolis Location within Indiana Location within the United States
- Location: 701 N. Senate Ave., Indianapolis, Indiana
- Coordinates: 39°46′41″N 86°9′47″W
- Area: Less than one acre
- Built: 1910
- Architect: Frank Baldwin Hunter
- Architectural style: Tudor Revival
- NRHP reference No.: 100007176
- Added to NRHP: November 15, 2021

The Colored Knights of Pythias Castle Hall, also known simply as "Castle Hall", is a historic building in downtown Indianapolis, Indiana, United States. This building was a hub of commercial and social activity for Colored Knights of Pythias who came together from several different Indianapolis lodges. The brick building was designed in the Tudor Revival style with sparse detail compared to other examples of the style, likely due to cost-saving measures taken during construction. Remnants of the original, grander design can be seen on external features of the castle hall, such as a label lintel with a stone hood around the entrance, as well as hooded windows and stepped parapets resembling castle turrets.

While the outside was sparse in comparison with original building plans, the inside had many ornate details. The inside of the building contains three floors, with a historic paint scheme of dark reds, greens, and mustard used throughout the building. The first floor contained the main lobby, which had a terrazzo floor with the Knights of Pythias emblem in the middle. The ceilings were made of pressed metal and showcased elaborate cove moldings. Similar ceiling design was also in the main staircase and second floor assembly hall. Seven storefronts, rented to retail tenants, could be accessed from the street. Both stairs and an elevator could be used to access the other floors of the building.

The second floor landing had a check-in room that may have been used as a ticket booth. Most of the second floor is taken up by a large assembly hall with a stage opposite the entrance. In the assembly hall, Knights of Pythias emblems are in the ceiling panels over the bays. The space is decorated with the pressed metal ceilings and cove moldings similar to the lobby and main staircase and stenciling on the front wall of the stage. The remainder of the space on the second story is taken up by hallways and two separate men's and women's lounges that connect to their own coat rooms and restrooms.

The third floor consisted of three meeting rooms, labeled "West", "Middle", and "East". The West meeting room had a platform parallel to the far wall. A kitchen was also located between the East meeting room and stairwell.As a Knights of Pythias meeting space, the building was out of commission by the 1940s due to loss of retail tenants and mounting financial issues faced by the Castle Hall Association. The building was operated as a storage facility until recently, and is currently under renovation.

== History ==
After the Knights of Pythias first began organizing in 1864, a number of Black Pythians formed a separate Colored Knights of Pythias 1880 after being refused membership. The first Indiana lodge was established in Evansville in 1889. Colored Pythians grew quickly in number after the organization spread to Indianapolis, with around 1,200 Pythians and 400 female members of the auxiliary organization, the Courts of Calanthe, recorded in 1910. The Indianapolis Castle Hall was intended to serve as a unified lodge, much like other Knights of Pythias buildings under the "castle hall" name. The construction of the building was spearheaded by an organization established by five of the eleven existing colored Pythian lodges in Indianapolis. Pride of the West, No. 2, Marion, No. 5, Montgomery, No. 6, and Compeer, No. 31 formed what became the Castle Hall Association.

By 1908, $4,000 had already been raised to cover the cost of land for the new building. In May 1910, a Pythian Jubilee was held to fundraise for construction. The final design was likely simplified due to issues raising the necessary $40,000 required for the original building plan.

The ground floor of the building contained several storefronts rented out to local Black businesses. One of the storefronts contained the offices of the Indianapolis Recorder from the hall's opening until 1920. Other tenants included Pythian Savings & Loan, a banking service for lodge members, as well as grocery stores, a restaurant, a dry cleaning business, and a delivery business.

After encountering problems with their financing company, the Castle Hall Association sold the building in 1947 to Marion H. Stuart, a tenant of the building who owned the delivery business. Stuart used the building as a storage facility; the company name "Stuart's Transfer & Storage" is still somewhat visible on the building. Stuart died in 2014.

== Renovations ==
The restoration for Castle Hall is managed by Henderson Development, LLC, owned by Alan Henderson. Henderson Development purchased the property in 2017 as a commercial building.

Over one million dollars in grant funding has been allocated for the restoration of Castle Hall. On December 20, 2023, the Mellon Foundation awarded $1.5 million through its Humanities in Place grant program for the planning, development, and community engagement initiatives related to the site. In 2025, the Indiana Landmarks Foundation and African American Cultural Heritage Action Fund provided additional funds for construction, giving $25,000 and a portion of a $3 million grant towards the repairs, respectively. Construction has stalled as of 2026, with millions in additional funding urgently needed to continue the restoration project. The building was placed on Indiana Landmarks' Top 10 Endangered Buildings list.
