= Jonathan Southern =

American artist

- Born: 1978 (age 47–48)
- Occupation: Portrait artist
- Website: jsouthartstudio.com

Jonathan Southern (born 1978), also known as J.South, is an American artist from Indianapolis, Indiana, known for his portraits. Primarily using graphite, colored pencil, and mixed media, Southern often depicts individuals from African-American history. He has exhibited work across the United States, including at the Cincinnati Art Museum, the Murphy Arts Center, and the Garfield Park Arts Center.

Southern is a self-taught artist and the owner of J.South Art Studio, creating fine art and commissioned portraits.
