= G. C. Murphy Building =

Historic mixed-use building in Indianapolis, Indiana, US

Coordinates: 39°45′10″N 86°08′27″W

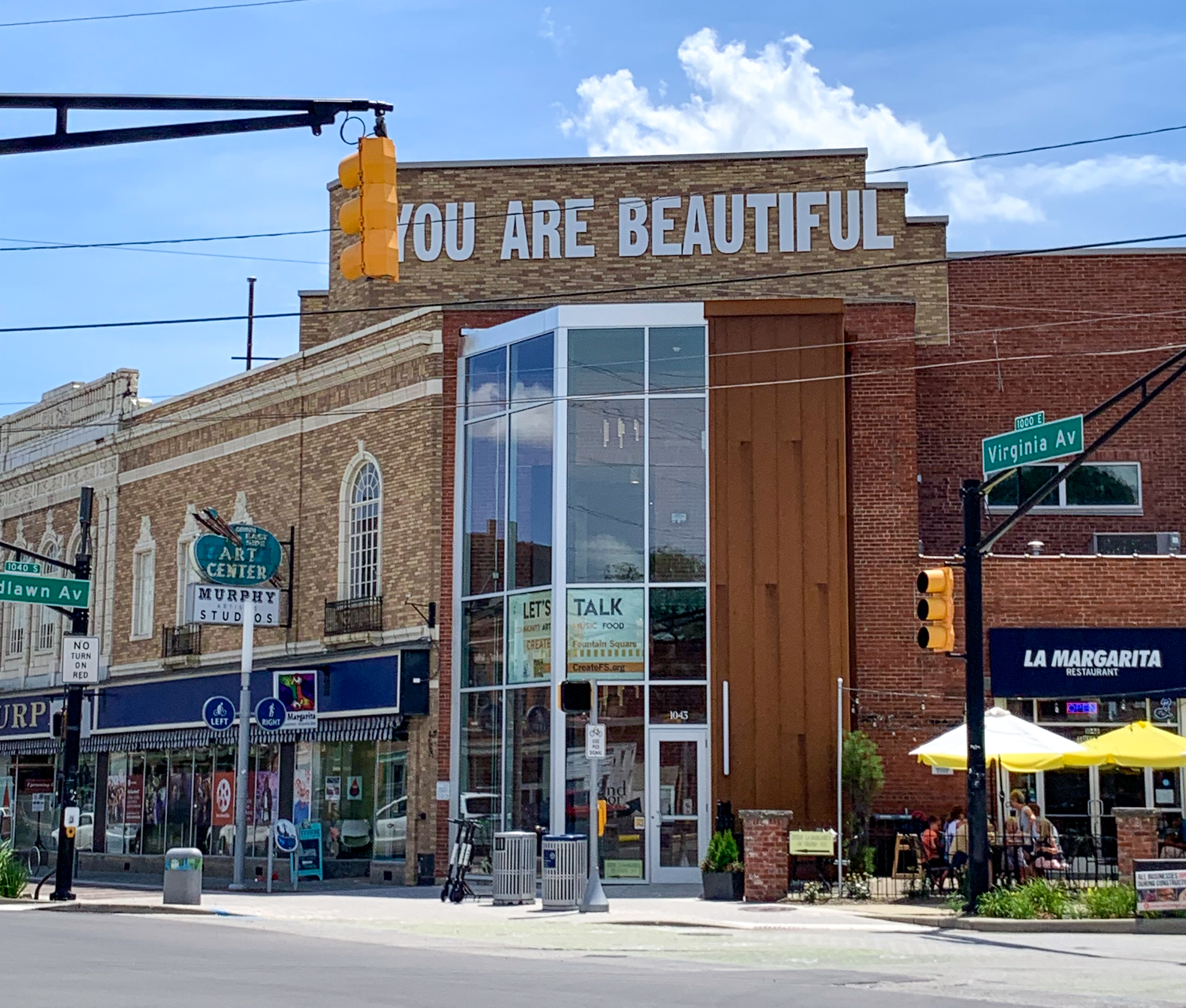
Modern view of the G. C. Murphy Building, which currently houses the Murphy Art Center.

The G.C. Murphy Building, better known as "The Murphy" or "The Murphy Building", was built in 1884 and is located at 1043 Virginia Avenue in the historic Fountain Square District of Indianapolis, Indiana, United States. The G.C. Murphy Building was once made up of separate buildings, but was joined in 1951 to become part of the now defunct chain of five and dime stores of the same name.

The Murphy Art Center is an arts center located in the G. C. Murphy Building. The Center houses five galleries, 23 artist's studios, a supplier of art materials, an Italian restaurant, an English Pub and a salon/gallery combination. The building is also home to the offices of MOKB Presents and their venue, The HIFI.

The building is listed on the National Register of Historic Places as a contributing property to the Fountain Square Commercial Areas Thematic Resources.

== Murphy Art Center ==
The Murphy Art Center rents out spaces to individual artists and art collectives. It became a hub for visual artists in the 1990s after artists Phil Campbell and Ed Funk bought the art center. The building was sold again in 2009 to Craig Von Deylen and Larry Jones after the art industry suffered from the impact of the 2008 recession. Over the course of its history as a studio space, it has housed artists including Lois Main Templeton and Gloria Fischer.

The art center is connected to the wider Indianapolis public through various local events. The art center participates in Indianapolis' First Fridays. A yearly event, Art Squared, was also established in 2013. Art Squared is a free festival featuring Indiana artists, creators, and community partners. The festival also has a creators space, live music from local musicians, and the "Masterpiece in a Day" challenge in which artists of all skill levels create a piece from scratch over the course of the festival day for a chance to win a cash prize.

Established artist collectives and individual artists have gradually moved out of the building into other neighborhoods for various reasons, including increased cost of living and population changes in the Fountain Square neighborhood. The art center faces continuous issues with gentrification, leading to artists being priced out of the neighborhood due to the rising profile of Fountain Square in the Indianapolis cultural sphere.

== See also ==
- List of attractions and events in Indianapolis
