= Virginia Avenue District =

Historic district in Indiana, United States

- U.S. National Register of Historic Places
- U.S. Historic district
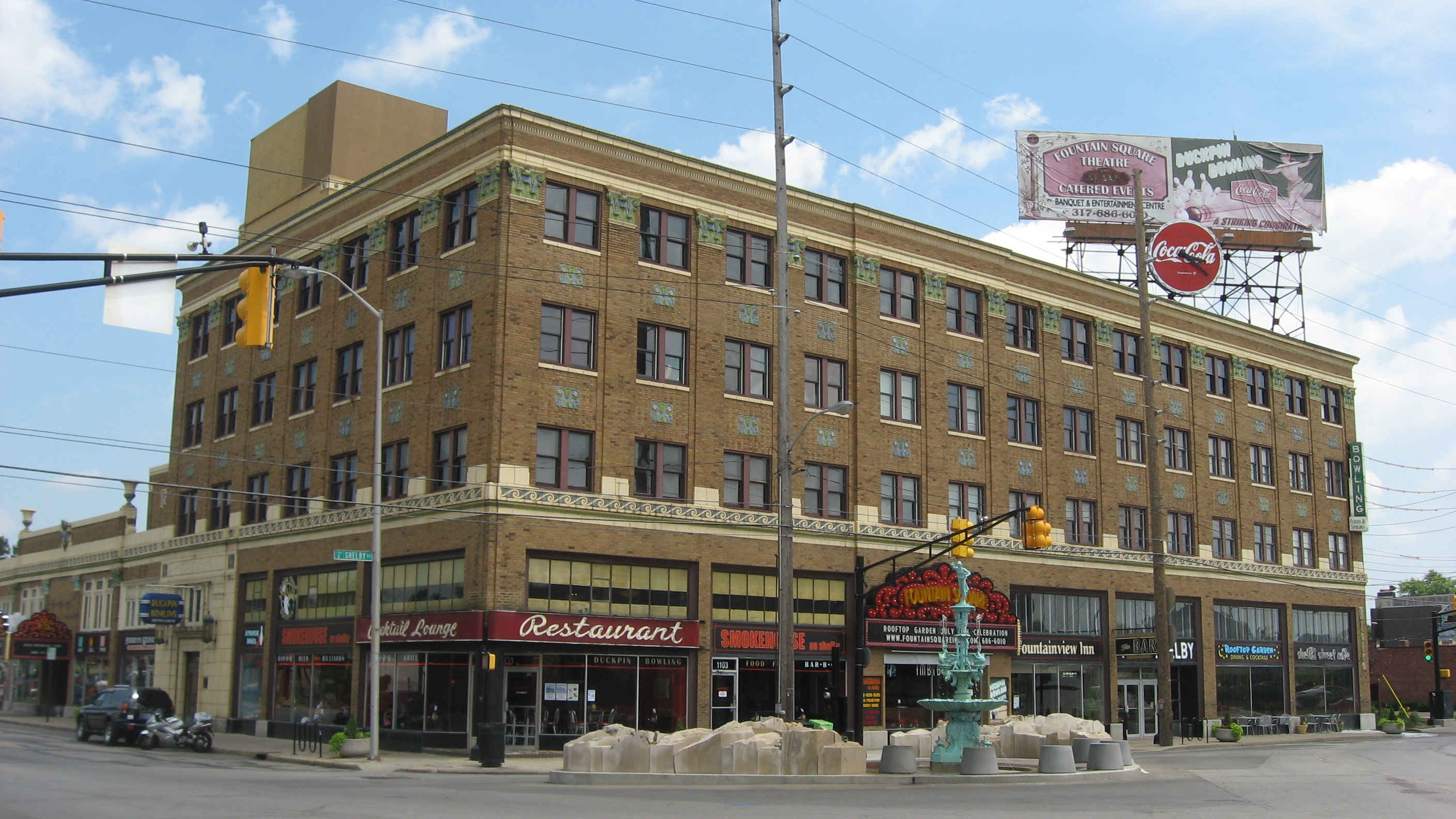
- Fountain Square Theatre, July 2011

- Location within Indianapolis Location within Indiana Location within the United States
- Location: Roughly Virginia Ave. from Grove Ave. To Prospect and Morris Sts., Indianapolis, Indiana
- Coordinates: 39°45′10″N 86°08′25″W
- Area: 12 acres (4.9 ha)
- Built: 1870
- Architect: Multiple
- MPS: Fountain Square Commercial Areas TR
- NRHP reference No.: 83003442
- Added to NRHP: June 30, 1983

Virginia Avenue District is a national historic district located at Indianapolis, Indiana. The district encompasses 43 contributing buildings and 1 contributing structure in the Fountain Square Commercial Areas of Indianapolis. It developed between about 1871 and 1932, and notable buildings include the Sanders (Apex) Theater (1913), Southside Wagon and Carriage Works / Saffel Chair Company (1875, c. 1916), Fountain Square Theater (1928), Woessner Building (1876, 1915), Granada Theater (1928), Southside Theater (1911), Schreiber Block (1895), Fountain Square State Bank (1922), and Fountain Bank (1902).

It was listed on the National Register of Historic Places in 1983.

== See also ==
- List of shopping streets and districts by city
- National Register of Historic Places listings in Center Township, Marion County, Indiana
