= Indianapolis Cultural Districts =

Neighborhoods in Indianapolis, Indiana, US

Indianapolis Cultural Districts are neighborhoods of Indianapolis, Indiana, United States that are officially designated by the City of Indianapolis government.

== History ==
Indianapolis's cultural district program was established as an economic development initiative of Mayor Bart Peterson's administration to promote public art and cultural development in the city. In 2002, Peterson formed the Indianapolis Cultural Development Commission whose steering committee selected the initial five cultural districts in 2003: Broad Ripple Village, Canal and White River State Park, Fountain Square, Mass Ave, and the Wholesale District. Indiana Avenue was designated in 2004. In response to the Great Recession, the commission disbanded in 2009; however, the program continued to operate with nonprofit support from the Indy Arts Council and Downtown Indy Inc.

In 2014, Mayor Greg Ballard designated Market East as the city's seventh cultural district. In 2025, Mayor Joe Hogsett's Department of Metropolitan Development oversaw an open call for applications that resulted 12 newly designated cultural districts and $500,000 in one-time grant funding distributed.

== List ==
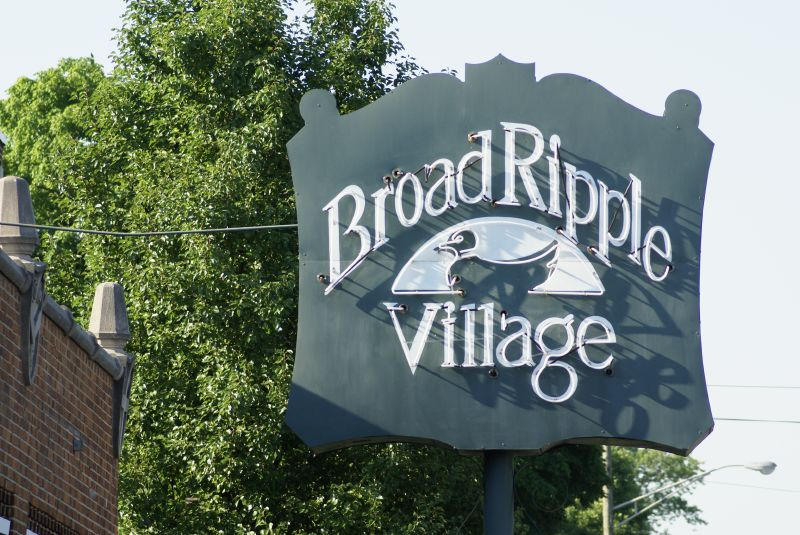
Broad Ripple Village sign, North College Avenue, 2007

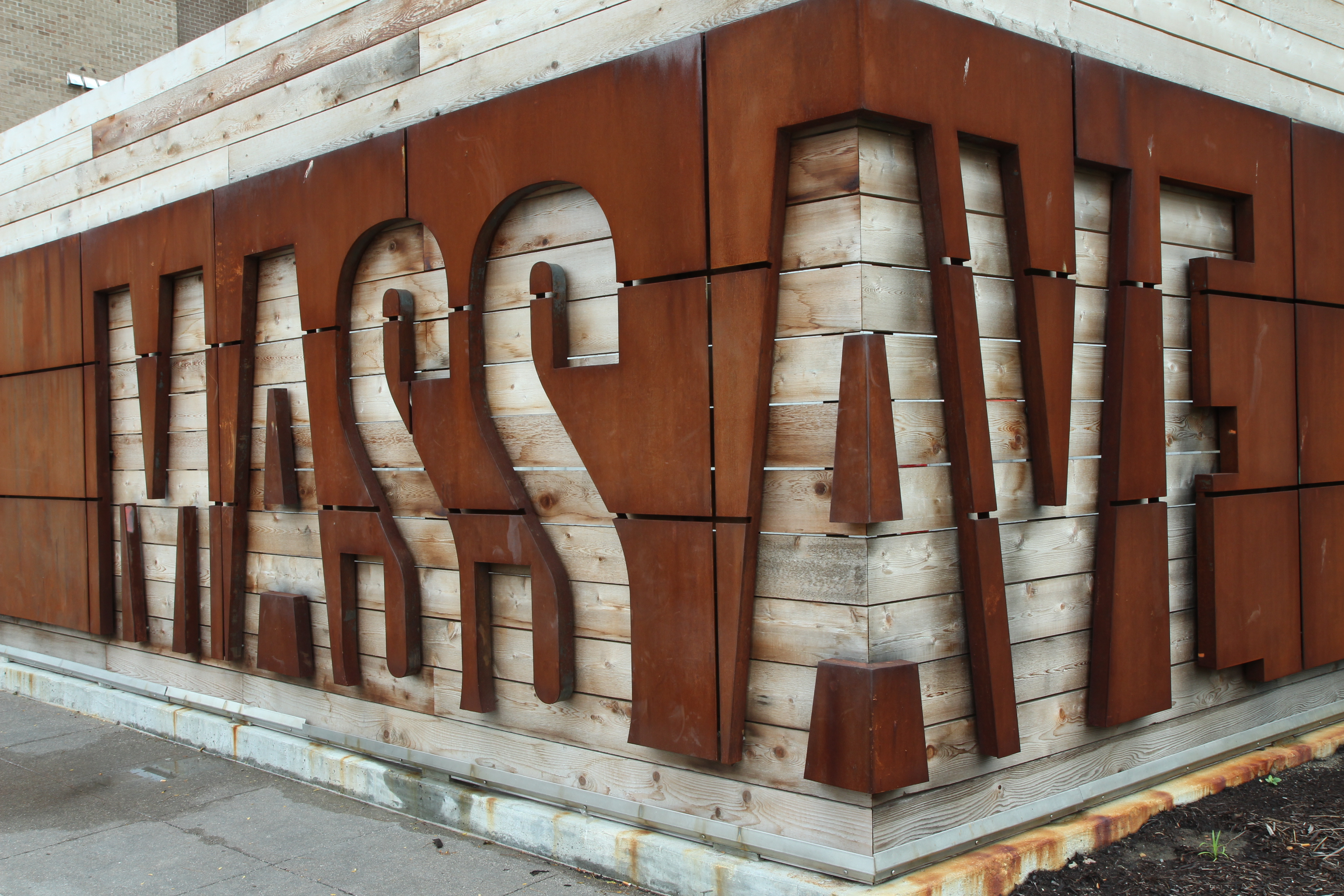
Mass Ave sign, Massachusetts Avenue, 2013

The following are the neighborhoods and years that they received cultural district designation:

- 10 East Arts, 2025
- Broad Ripple Village, 2003
- Canal and White River State Park, 2003
- Community Heights, 2025
- Cottage Home, 2025
- East 38th Street Corridor, 2025
- Fletcher Place, 2025
- Fountain Square, 2003
- Franklin Township, 2025
- Garfield Park, 2025
- Indiana Avenue, 2004
- Irvington, 2025
- Little Flower, 2025
- Market East, 2014
- Mass Ave Cultural Arts District, 2003
- Midtown Arts District, 2025
- Riverside, 2025
- SoBro and East 46th Street, 2025
- Wholesale District, 2003

== See also ==
- Economy of Indianapolis
- Indianapolis Cultural Trail
- List of attractions and events in Indianapolis
- List of neighborhoods in Indianapolis
