= Little Flower, Indianapolis =

Neighborhood in Indianapolis, Indiana, US

Little Flower is a neighborhood on the near eastside of Indianapolis, Indiana. Its boundaries are 16th Street, 10th Street, Emerson Avenue, and Sherman Drive.

Little Flower has two grocery stores, at least three convenience stores, restaurants, bars, a post office, churches, schools, and other entertainment options within walking distance. The neighborhood is named for Saint Thérèse of Lisieux, to whom the neighborhood's Little Flower Catholic Church is dedicated. The majority of the homes in the neighborhood are bungalows, most of them constructed in the 1920s. Little Flower is part of the Near Eastside Community Organization, aimed at improving neighborhoods on the city's east side.

== Location ==
Little Flower is located at approximately 39°47′08″N 86°05′37″W. The boundaries of the neighborhood are 16th Street on the north, 10th Street on the south, Emerson Avenue on the east, and Sherman Drive on the west. The neighborhood is approximately one mile (1.6 km) south of Interstate 70 and is near exits 85 and 87 of that highway.

== See also ==
- Indianapolis Cultural Districts
- List of neighborhoods in Indianapolis
