= State and Prospect District =

Historic district in Indiana, United States

- U.S. National Register of Historic Places
- U.S. Historic district
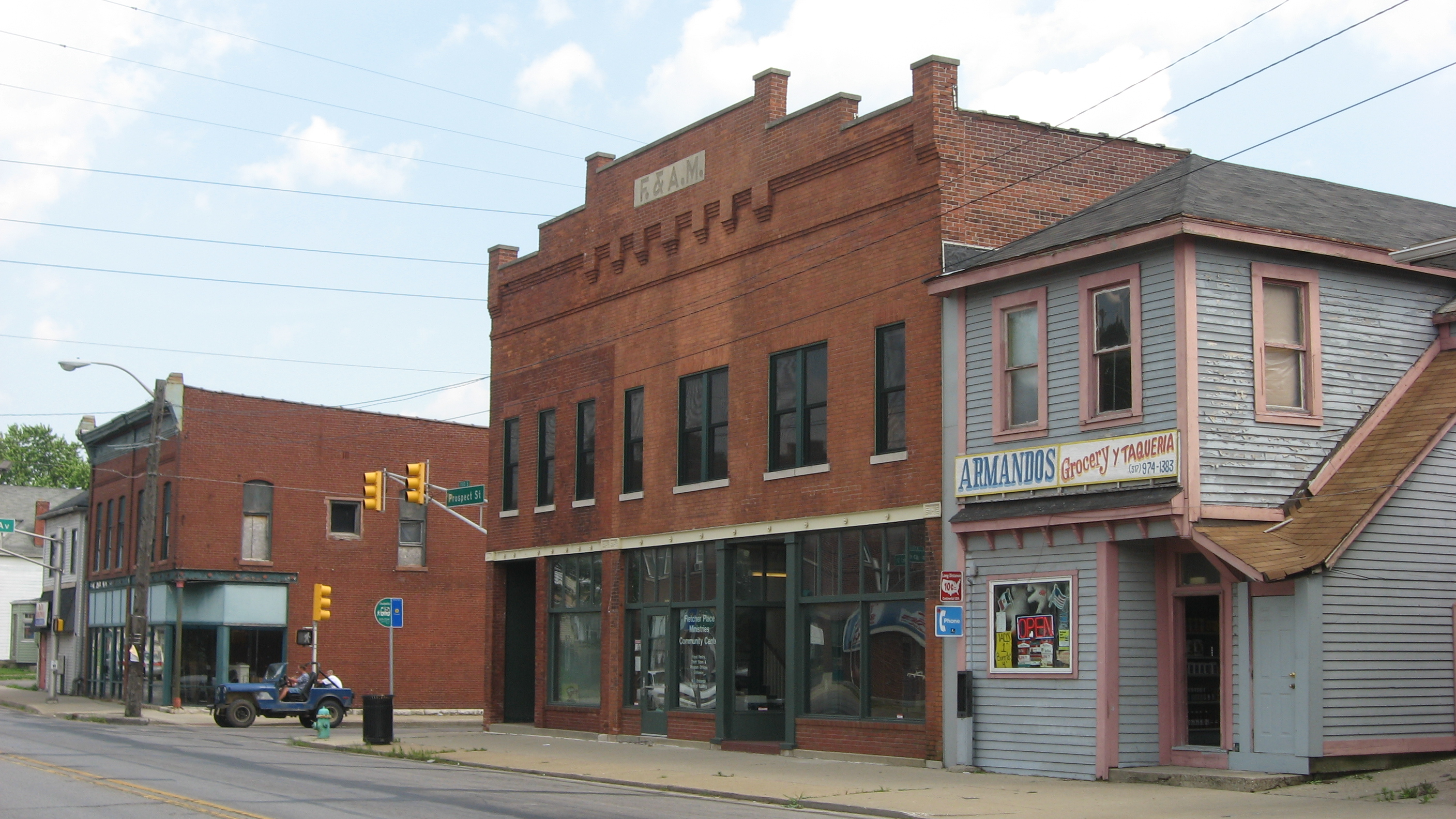
- State and Prospect District, July 2011

- Location within Indianapolis Location within Indiana Location within the United States
- Location: State Ave. and Prospect St., Indianapolis, Indiana
- Coordinates: 39°45′9″N 86°7′49″W
- Area: 3 acres (1.2 ha)
- Built: 1871
- Architect: Multiple
- MPS: Fountain Square Commercial Areas TR
- NRHP reference No.: 83000137
- Added to NRHP: June 30, 1983

State and Prospect District is a national historic district located at Indianapolis, Indiana. The district encompasses eight contributing buildings and one contributing object in the Fountain Square Commercial Areas of Indianapolis. It developed between about 1871 and 1932, and notable buildings include the Mitschrich / Schaefer Feed Store (c. 1890), Sommer / Roempke Bakery (1875, 1908), and Lorber's Saloon (1885).

It was listed on the National Register of Historic Places in 1983.

== See also ==
- National Register of Historic Places listings in Center Township, Marion County, Indiana
