= Lovel D. Millikan House =

Historic house in Indiana, United States

- U.S. National Register of Historic Places
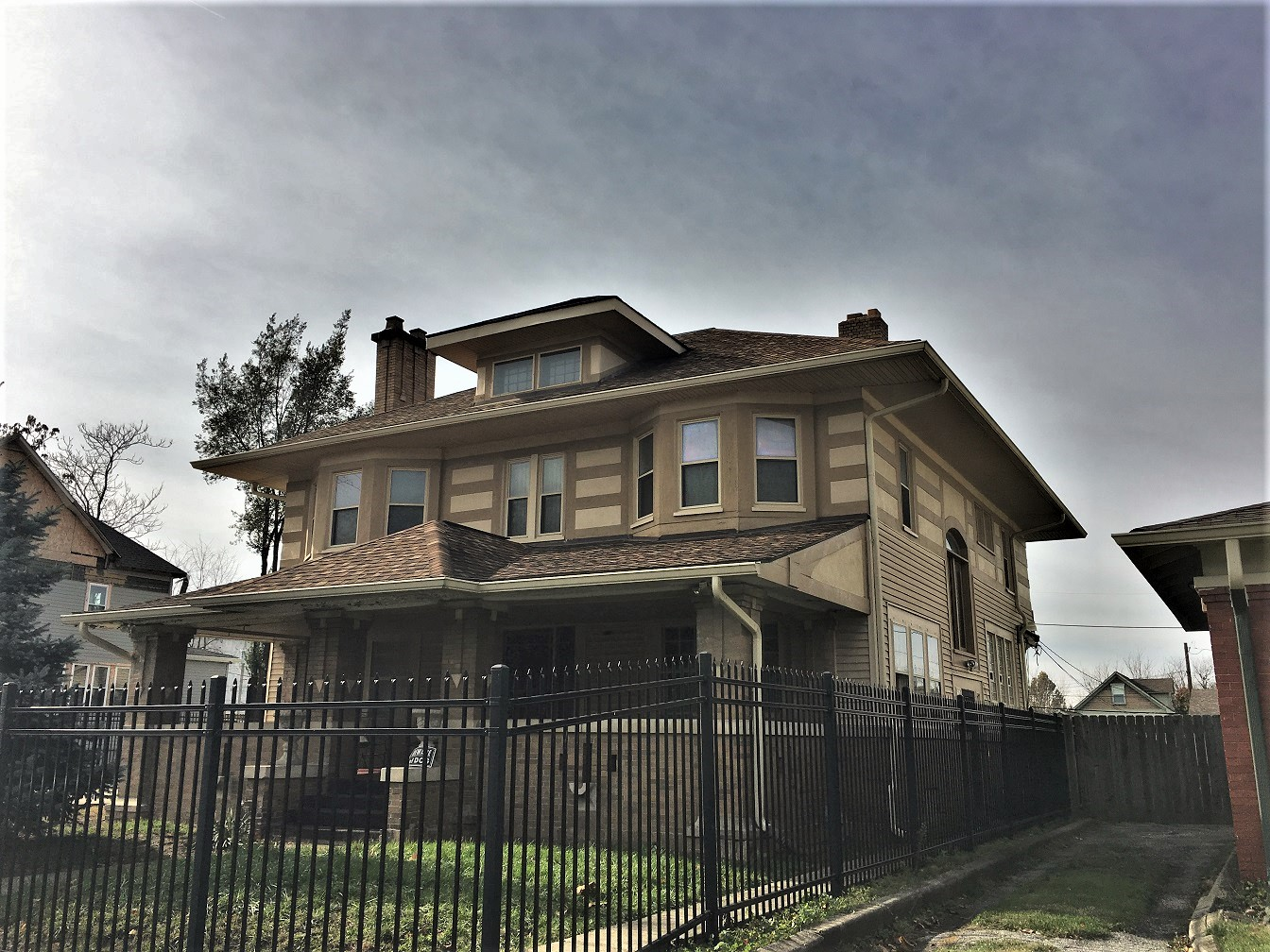
- Lovel D. Millikan House, 2017

- Location within Indianapolis Location within Indiana Location within the United States
- Location: 2530 N. Park Ave., Indianapolis, Indiana
- Coordinates: 39°48′13″N 86°08′54″W
- Area: less than 1 acre (0.40 ha)
- Built: 1910-1911
- Architect: Hunter, Frank B.
- Architectural style: Foursquare, Craftsman
- NRHP reference No.: 100001608
- Added to NRHP: October 18, 2017

The Lovel D. Millikan House is a historic home located in Indianapolis, Indiana. It was designed in 1911 by architect Frank Baldwin Hunter and typifies the American Foursquare style. It has a square shape with two stories, a hipped roof with central dormer window, and rectangular front porch that spans the width of the building. The house also features specific Craftsman styles that separate it from similar homes in the neighborhood. These features include the stylized motifs in the exterior stucco and brick, pyramidal roofs over the front porch entry and roof dormer, and interior features throughout the home.

It was listed on the National Register of Historic Places in 2017.

== See also ==
- National Register of Historic Places listings in Center Township, Marion County, Indiana
