= Saint James Court =

- U.S. National Register of Historic Places
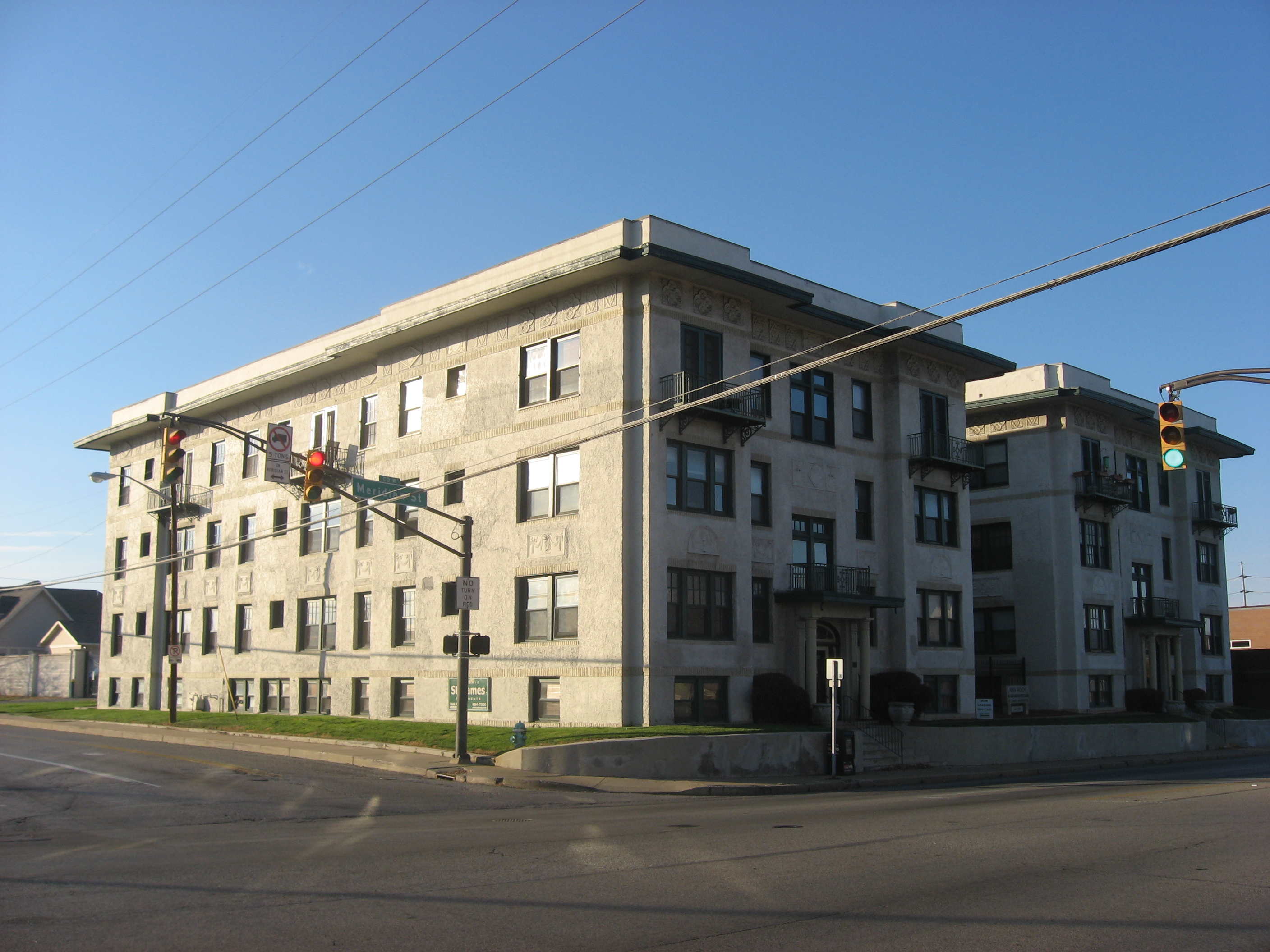
- Saint James Court, November 2010

- Location within Indianapolis Location within Indiana Location within the United States
- Location: 2102-2108 N. Meridian St., Indianapolis, Indiana
- Coordinates: 39°47′43″N 86°9′27″W
- Area: less than one acre
- Built: 1919
- Architectural style: Late 19th And 20th Century Revivals, Renaissance Revival
- NRHP reference No.: 87000071
- Added to NRHP: February 18, 1987

Saint James Court is a historic apartment complex located at Indianapolis, Indiana. It was built in 1919, and consists of two 3 1/2-story, Renaissance Revival style buildings. The buildings are faced in thick stucco and feature terra cotta panels with bas relief decoration.

It was listed on the National Register of Historic Places in 1987.

== See also ==
- National Register of Historic Places listings in Center Township, Marion County, Indiana
