= Riverside, Indianapolis =

Neighborhood in Indianapolis, Indiana, US

Coordinates: 39°48′04″N 86°11′11″W

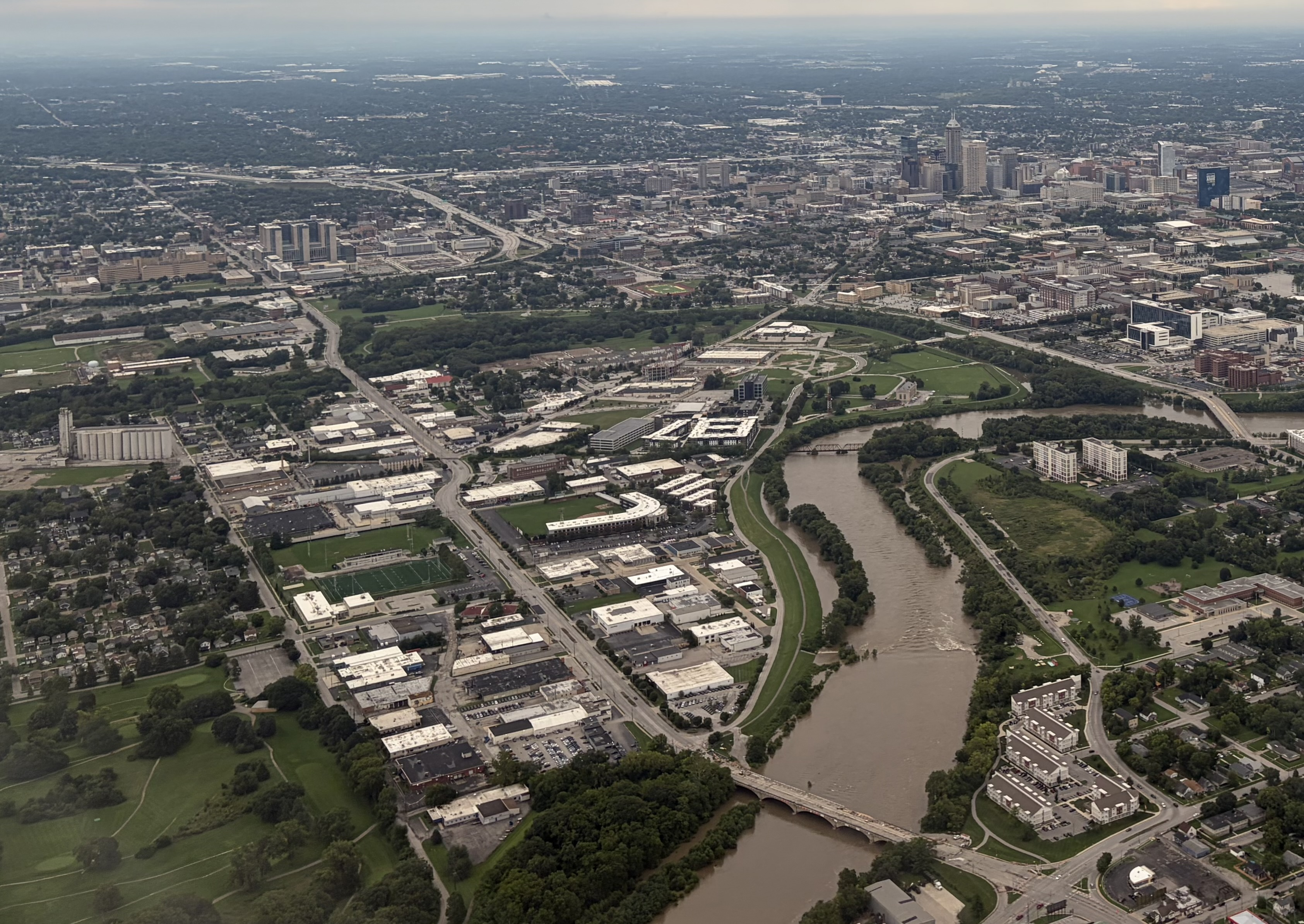
An aerial view of the Riverside area of Indianapolis

The Riverside neighborhood is a historic neighborhood on the near west side of Indianapolis, Indiana, United States. The housing consists mainly of American foursquare-type homes and bungalows built in the 1910s to 1920s. Seventy-five percent of the homes in the area were built before 1939. Riverside is named for its location beside the White River.

== Overview ==
The boundaries of Riverside are 30th Street on the north, Fall Creek to the south, the Indiana Central Canal to the east, and the White River to the west. Many of the neighborhood's focus areas are situated along Harding Street.

== History ==
Riverside is a diverse community that has undergone several cycles of change since its founding. As a result, a number of attempts have been made to revitalize the neighborhood in recent years. The neighborhood association is Riverside Civic League (RCL) and it has worked hard to attract positive changes to enhance community life. It became a founding member of the North West Quality of Life Plan (NWQOL). Located within its boundaries is Riverside Park, one of the city's regional parks. This 96-acre (39 ha) park has swimming and outdoor sports opportunities, and is adjacent to three public golf courses.

== Amusement park ==
The Riverside Amusement Park was founded in 1903 with funding from investors from Indianapolis and Pittsburgh. It was located north of 30th Street and had a toboggan ride and concession stands. As Riverside and the surrounding area grew, the amusement park continued to expand. In 1919, under new ownership, it introduced segregation in response to the growing African-American population in the neighborhood. On most days, the park was only available to white patrons but there were special days set aside for black patrons. The park and the neighborhood both prospered during and after World War II but the neighborhood was affected by dramatic white flight. By the 1960s, the racial makeup of the neighborhood had changed to such an extent that the owners of the park were forced to desegregate in an attempt to remain profitable. This failed and the park closed in 1970. The Rivers Edge Development that now occupies the site. The community has undergone further racial changes and has add a large number of Hispanic neighbors. This has led to a dual language academy (Global Prep) opening to help bridge the language gap among elementary students.

The community has started to see new houses being built as of 2018 after nearly 60 years of no new housing being developed. This trend to replace outdated and demolished housing stock is expected to continue for the next 10–15 years. New business have started to open up to serve the community needs. In the fall of 2018, 16 Tech (on the south side of the neighborhood) started the work to redevelop the former water company site. They are building a medical sciences and technology park with the goal of creating a place where innovation is able to run free and collaboration is expected.

== Current status ==
Riverside has been included in the umbrella neighborhood organization known as the North West Quality of Life Plan since 2014. The success of this neighborhood is rooted in its grassroots neighborhood association, the Riverside Civic League, the second-oldest neighborhood association in the city. The leadership in Riverside have historically served as Governance Chairs of the NWQOL and served as chair/advisors of many committees and organizations that are active in the Near North West Side of Downtown Indianapolis. The neighborhood is known as a leader and a strong advocate for quality of life and development that preserves and protects its residents, history, culture while bringing new opportunities to the table.

Students in kindergarten through sixth grade in the Riverside neighborhood have access to their choice of three elementary schools. High school students go to Riverside High School or IPS schools. The community is bordered by Marian University, Indiana University–Purdue University Indianapolis, Butler University, and Ivy Tech Community College.

== See also ==
- Indianapolis Cultural Districts
- List of African-American neighborhoods
- List of Indianapolis neighborhoods
- Streetcar suburb
