= Fletcher Place =

Neighborhood and historic district in Indianapolis, Indiana, US

- Fletcher Place Historic District
- U.S. National Register of Historic Places
- U.S. Historic district
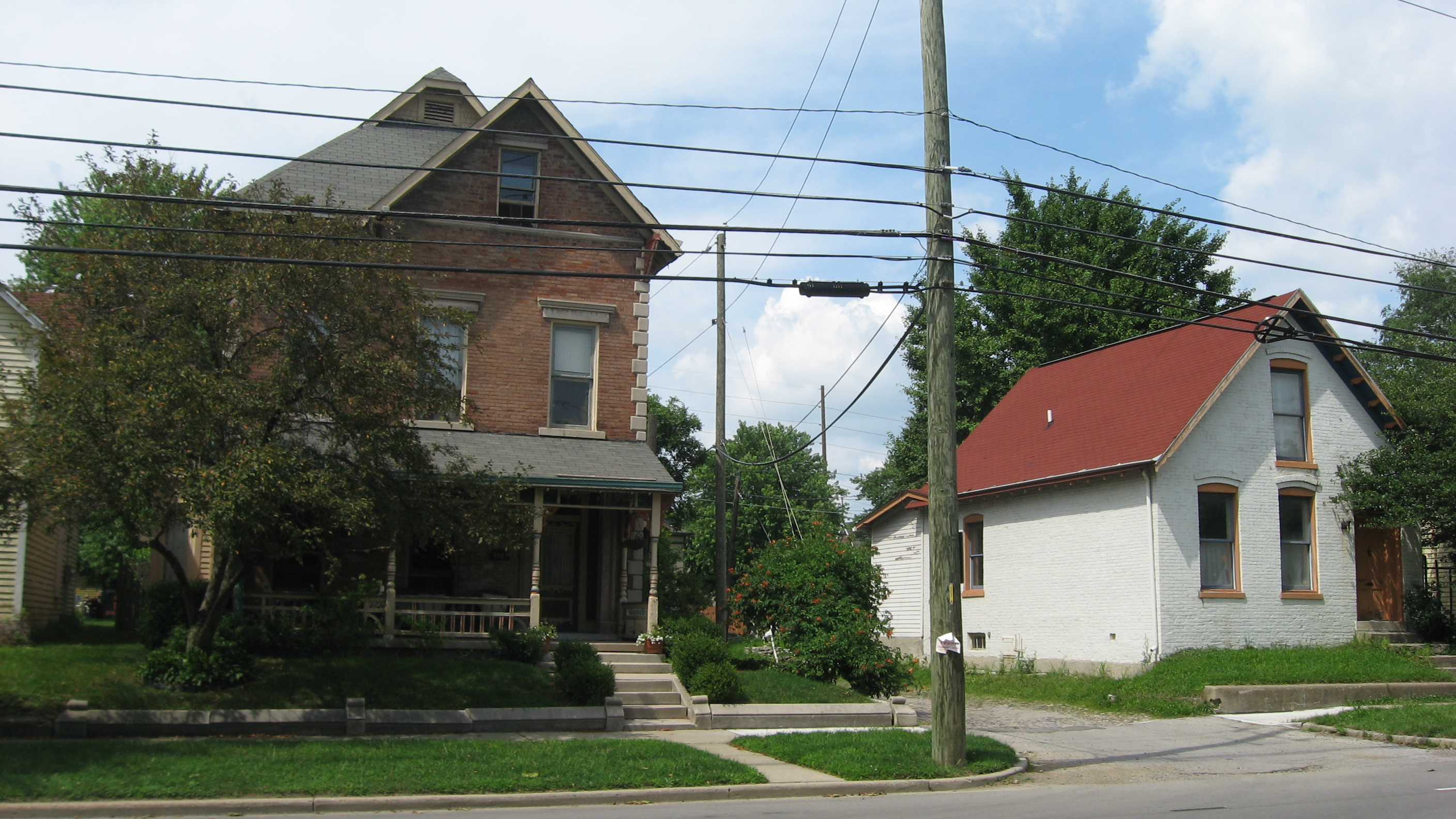
- Houses on Fletcher Avenue in the neighborhood

- Location within Indianapolis Location within Indianapolis Location within Indiana Location within the United States
- Location: Roughly bounded by railroad tracks, Interstates 65/70, East St., and Virginia Ave., Indianapolis, Indiana
- Coordinates: 39°45′27″N 86°8′46″W
- Area: 40.5 acres (16.4 ha)
- Built: 1855
- Architectural style: Italianate, Gothic Revival, Queen Anne
- NRHP reference No.: 82000061
- Added to NRHP: February 1, 1982

Fletcher Place is a historic district and neighborhood in the city of Indianapolis, Indiana named after Calvin Fletcher, a prominent local banker, farmer and state senator.

The neighborhood is clearly defined by I-70/I-65 to the south and East Street to the west. The northern border of the neighborhood is along South Street, Lord Street, Fletcher Avenue, and Bates Street, depending on specific location. The eastern border of the neighborhood is Virginia Avenue in some places, while it is I-65 in a few spots, and Calvary Street in a few areas.

Fletcher Place is surrounded by the Wholesale District to the north, Eli Lilly and Company to the west, Bates-Hendricks neighborhood to the south, and Fountain Square to the east and southeast.

Fletcher Place is the home to a few of Indianapolis' keynote restaurants: Bluebeard, Iaria's Italian, Bosphorus Istanbul Cafe, and Dugout Bar. Additionally, Eli Lilly and Company and Anthem have their world headquarters bordering Fletcher Place, making it a magnet neighborhood for Indianapolis' health-care industry professionals.

== Fletcher Place Historic District ==
The Fletcher Place Historic District is a 40.5-acre (16.4 ha) national historic district in the neighborhood that was listed on the National Register of Historic Places in 1982. In 1982, it included 140 contributing buildings that were deemed to contribute to the historic character of the area. It developed between about 1855 and 1924, and includes representative examples of Italianate, Gothic Revival, and Queen Anne style architecture. Notable buildings include the Briggs Flats (1893), The Lavon Building (c. 1885–1890), Ada Apartments (c. 1900–1910), Fletcher Place Methodist Church, school building (1857 and later), and a gasoline station (1919).

== See also ==
- Indianapolis Cultural Districts
- List of neighborhoods in Indianapolis
- National Register of Historic Places listings in Center Township, Marion County, Indiana
