= Lois Main Templeton =

American artist (1928–2018)

- Born: January 16, 1928; Madison, Wisconsin
- Died: November 7, 2018 (aged 90); Orono, Maine
- Education: Herron School of Art and Design
- Occupations: Painter and writer

Lois Main Templeton (January 16, 1928 – November 7, 2018) was an abstract oil painter who helped revitalize much of the Indianapolis art community.

== Personal life ==
Lois Main Templeton was born in Madison, Wisconsin to Dorothy Turner Main and John Smith Main. She married Kenneth Stuart Templeton Jr in 1947. Following a job offer for her husband, she moved to Indiana in 1979.

== Career ==
In 1981 she graduated from Herron School of Art and Design and rented a studio at the Faris Building in Indianapolis. Her art used oil paint to create abstract paintings. In the 1990s, she was started including words within her paintings.

She helped found Very Special Arts (now known as ArtMix) in Indianapolis in 1980, a nonprofit organization that provides art education and community to people with special needs. Main Templeton taught at Herron after graduating from the school, while also creating art programs for children across Indianapolis.

Main Templeton received the NUVO Cultural Vision Lifetime Achievement Award in 2011. She also the books The Studio Book and Who Makes the Sun Rise.

== Death ==
Lois Main Templeton died in Orono, Maine, on November 7, 2018.
