= Fountain Square Theatre =

Commercial building in Indianapolis, Indiana, US

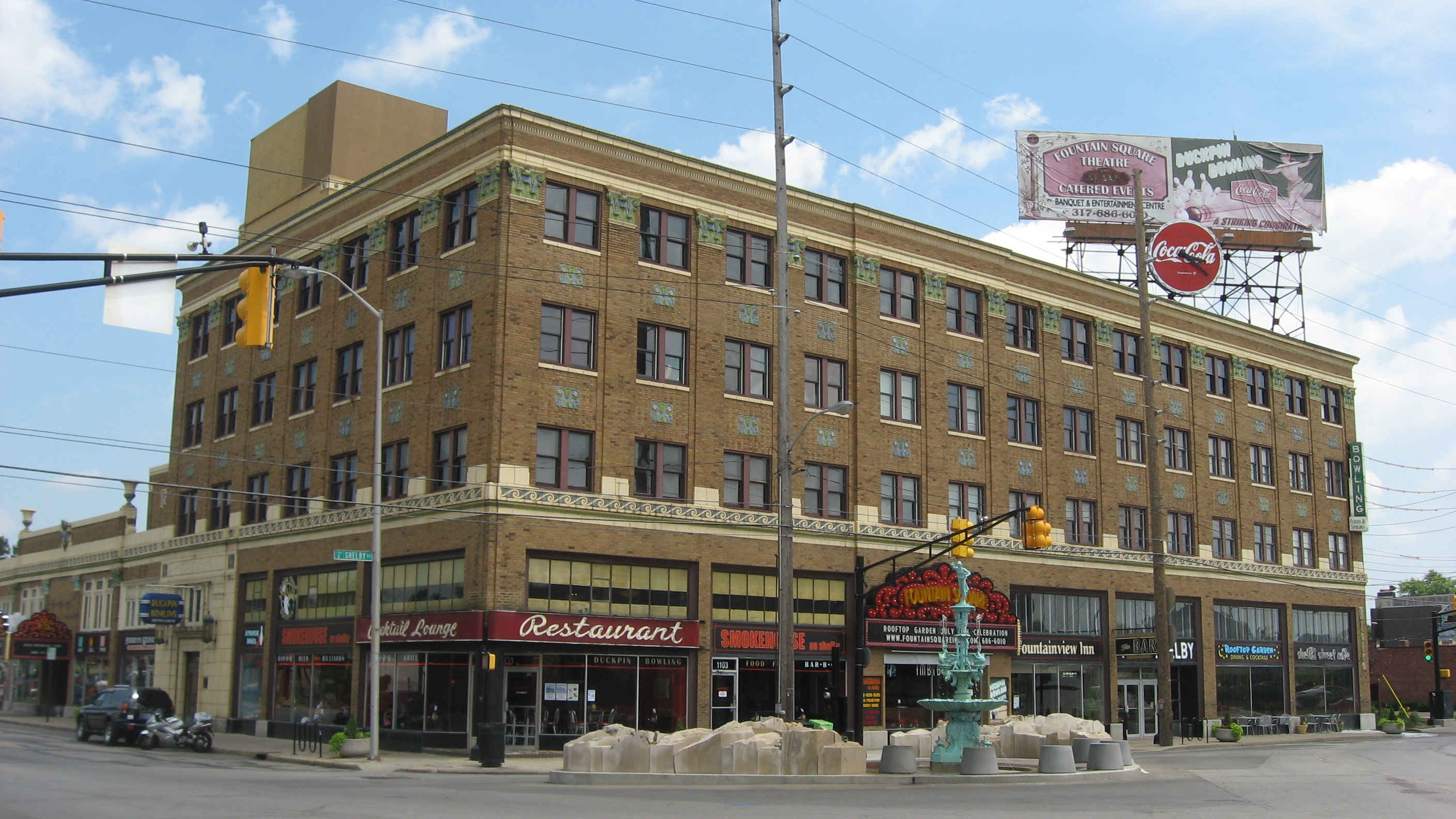
- Interactive map of Fountain Square Theatre

General information
- Coordinates: 39.7521°N 86.1396°W
- Opened: May 4, 1928

Design and construction
- Architect: Frank Baldwin Hunter

The Fountain Square Theatre is a landmark commercial building that is located in the Virginia Avenue District of Indianapolis, Indiana, United States.

The building houses restaurants, bars, a hotel, duckpin bowling, as well as the original theater. Construction of the building was completed on Friday, May 4, 1928, with an original capacity of 1,500. It hosted a variety of entertainment including moving pictures and live vaudeville shows which included a full orchestra pit and Marr-Colton organ. The Theatre had its official opening on Saturday, May 5, 1928, and was noted for its Italian themed interior. Fountain Square Recreation, a bowling alley and billiard hall, was located on the fourth floor. Frank Baldwin Hunter of Indianapolis was the architect.

== Closures and restoration ==
By 1957 the fourth-floor bowling alley closed followed by the theatre closing in 1960. Following the closure of the theatre, Woolworth's moved into the ground floor, but closed by the end of the 1960s.

In 1993 Linton Calvert purchased the building for $600,000 and started restoring it. Calvert was interesting in the building due to its past housing a bowling alley. Once renovated, he installed a duckpin bowling alley with original 1930's equipment that he had found in Columbia City, Indiana. In 2017 a Chicago-based real estate firm, North Park Ventures LLC, purchased the building from Calvert for an undisclosed amount. Calvert was allowed to keep ownership of the businesses in the building. In 2022 Calvert sold all six businesses to local wedding venue operators.

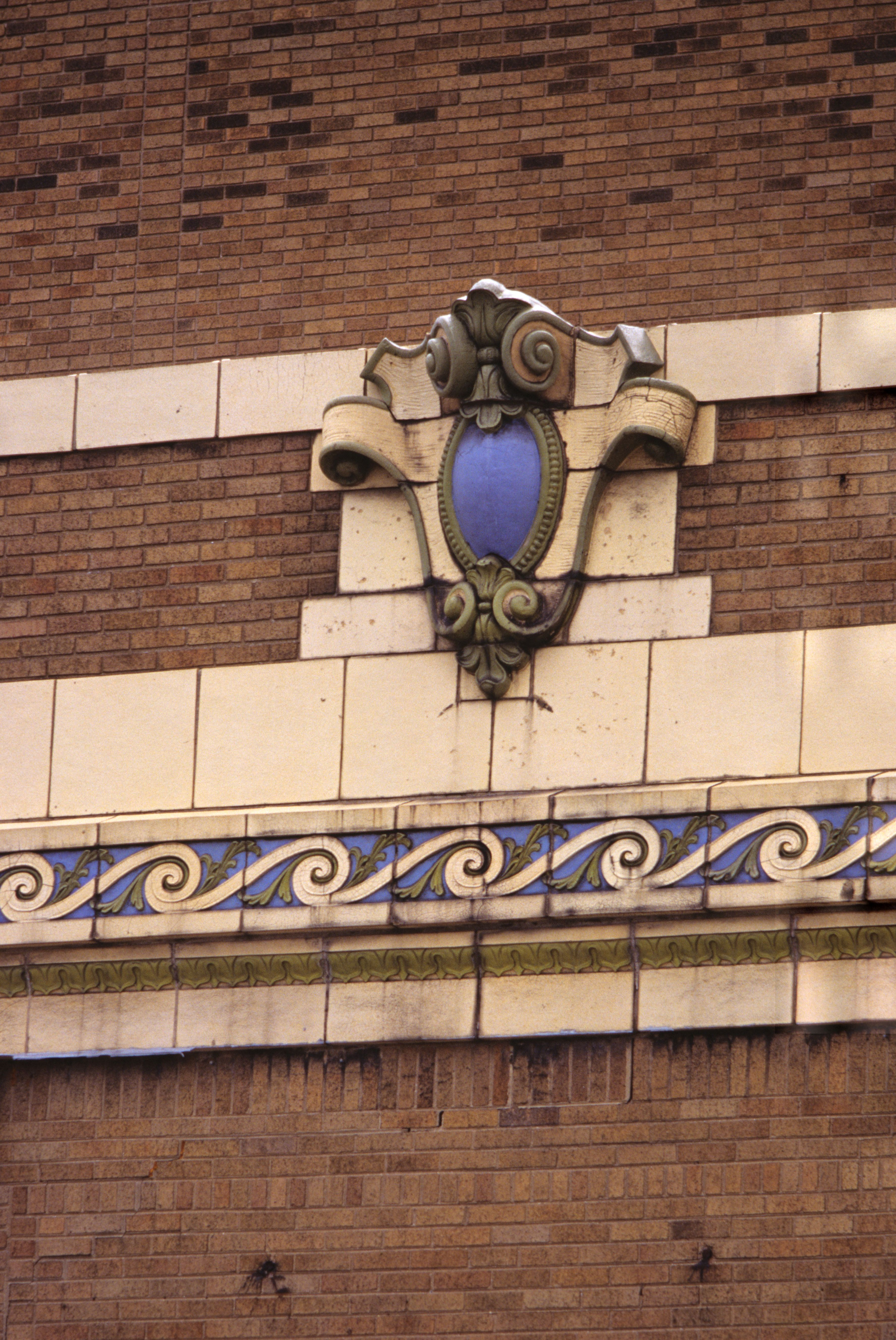

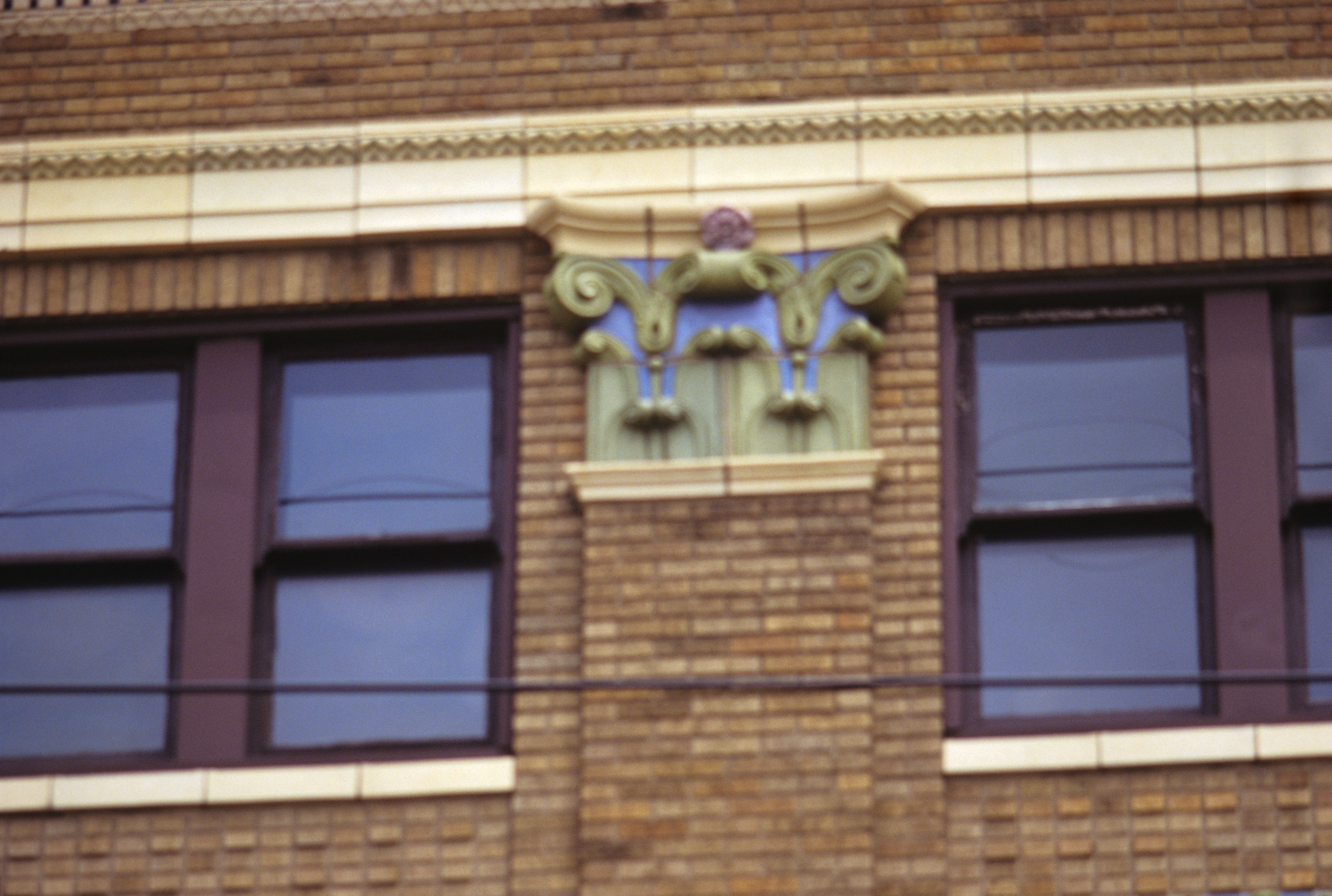

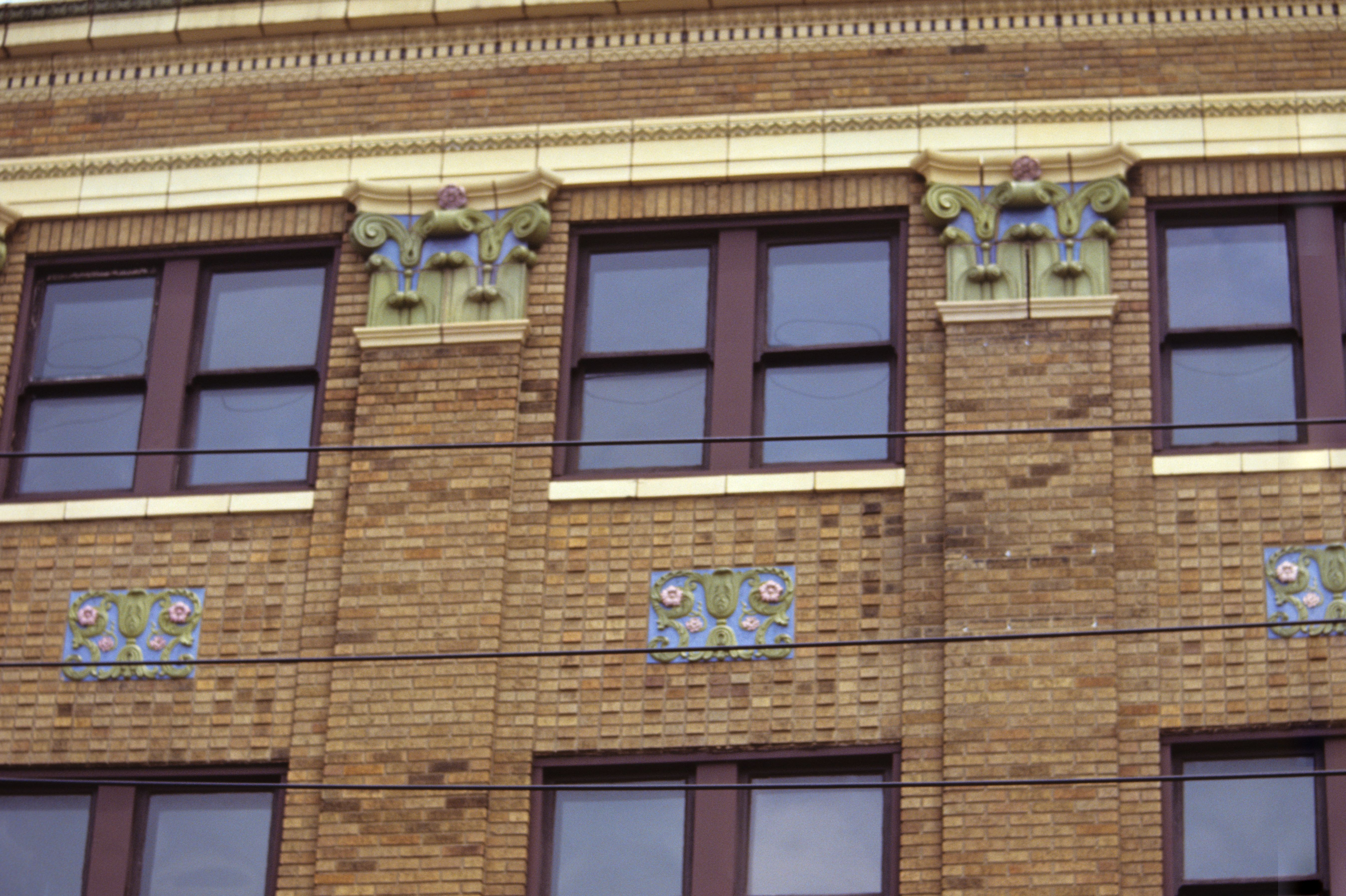

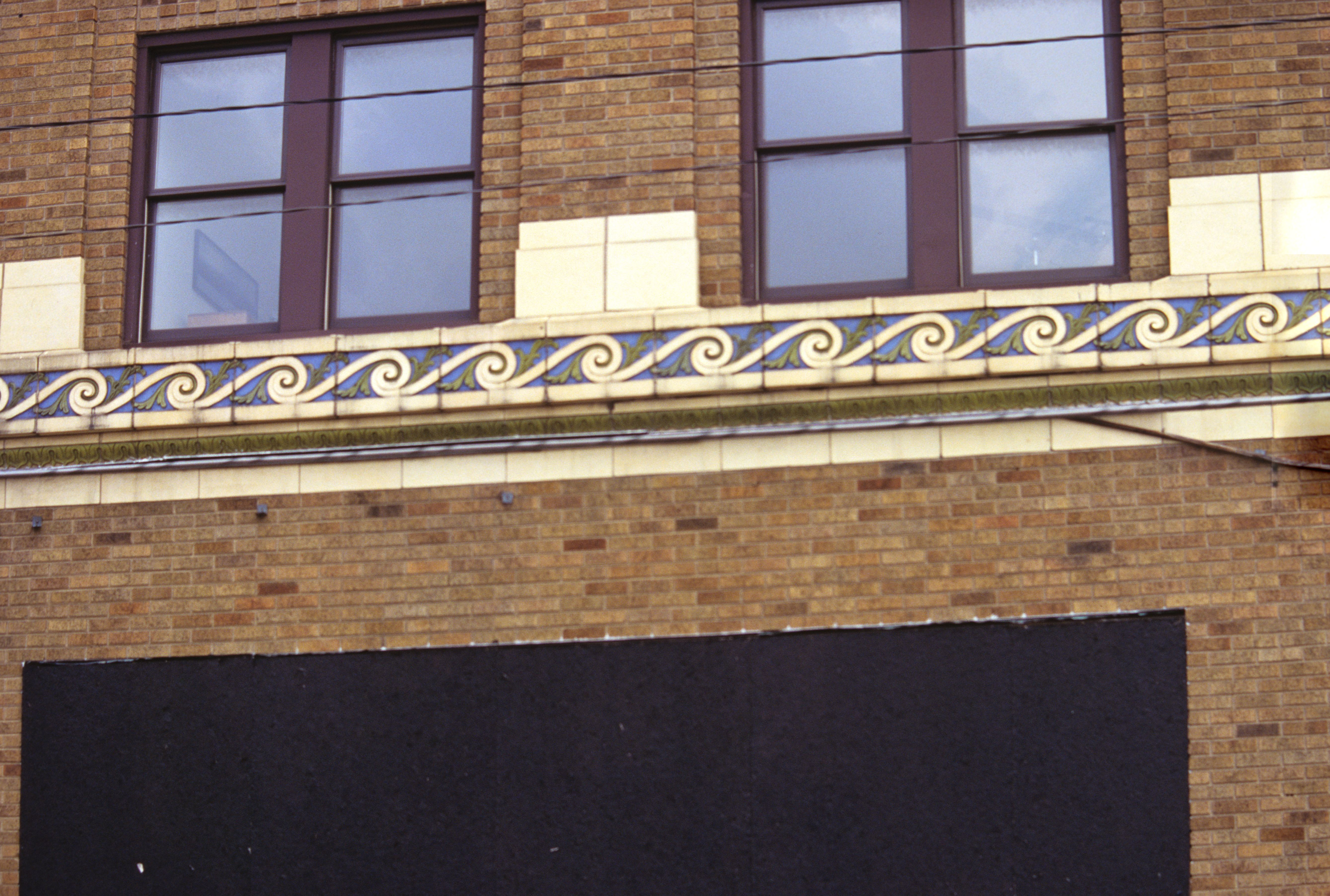

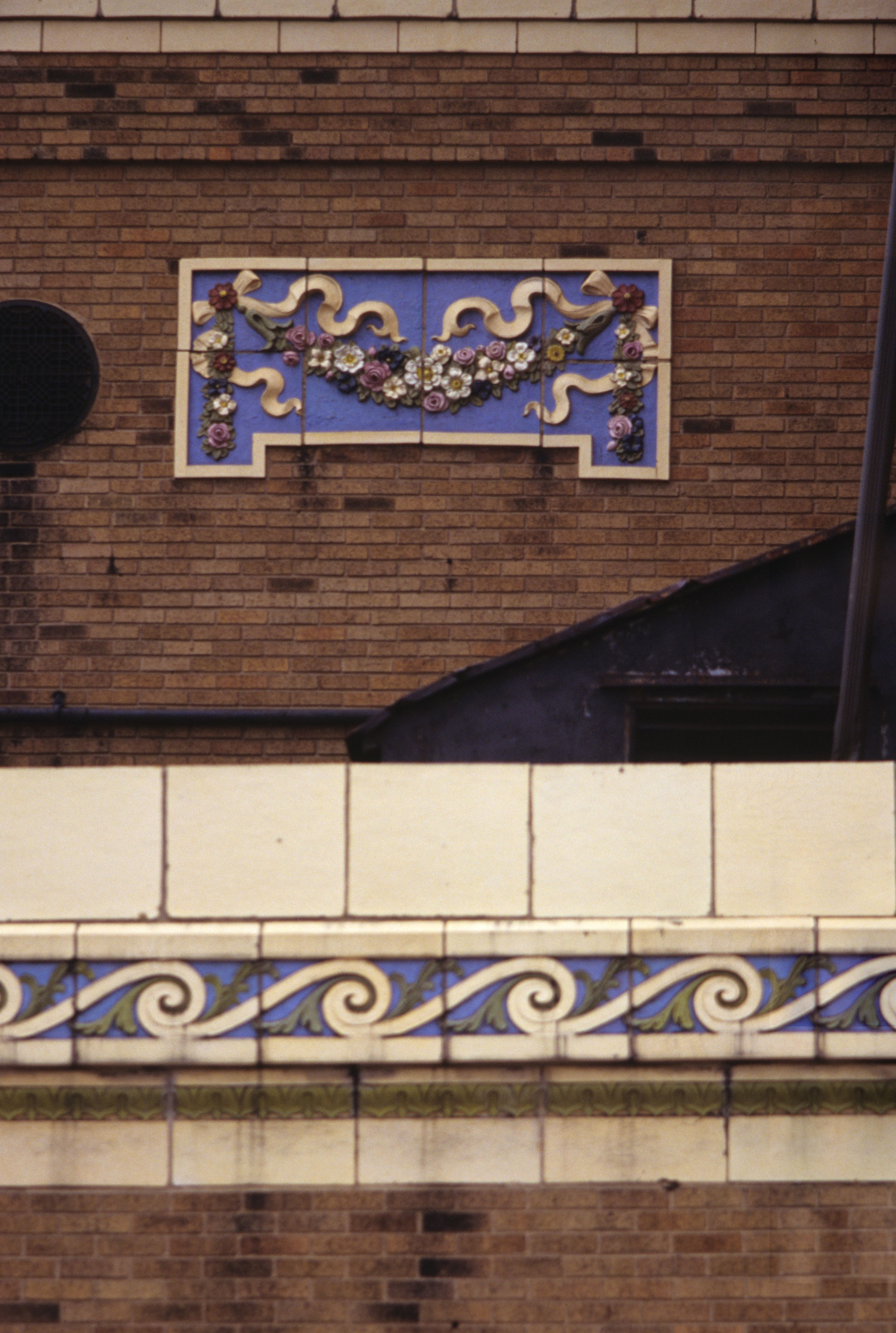

== See also ==
- List of attractions and events in Indianapolis
