= Indianapolis Historic Preservation Commission =

Governing Historical preservation oversight body of Indianapolis, Indiana

- Abbreviation: IHPC
- Formation: 1967
- Legal status: Commission
- Headquarters: City-County Building, 200 E. Washington Street
- Location: Indianapolis, Indiana, United States
- Region served: Wider Indianapolis
- Services: Historic designation, building repair
- President: William A. Browne, Jr.
- Vice President: David L. Baker
- Secretary: Susan Williams
- Administrator: Meg Busch
- Board of directors: Annie Lear, Disa Watson-Summers, Michael Bivens, Anson Keller, Anjanette Sivilich RA, Krystin Wiggs
- Website: https://www.indy.gov/agency/indianapolis-historic-preservation-commission

The Indianapolis Historic Preservation Commission (IHPC) is an entity in the Indianapolis city government created to preserve Indianapolis history. The commission was established in 1967.

== Functions ==
The IHPC preserves historic areas and structures in Marion County, Indiana, United States. It oversees the exteriors of historic landmarks, ensuring they are stable and appropriate. Citizens can apply to have the commission review and repair historic structures. It has a collection in the Indiana University Indianapolis library of digitized images of historically significant areas within the city.

== History ==
In 1967, through state legislation, the IHPC was formed and assigned seven commissioners. A year later, it reviewed Lockerbie Square for historic zoning and architectural review. It was given more legal strength and establishment in a government office in 1975. The commission's organization was, again, revised in 1982. It was required to have nine commissioners instead of seven, with one commissioner having to live in a historic district.

Herron Art Library at IU Indianapolis was given digitization permissions for images of historic structures and areas in 2011. The image links and documents contain information about the structures pictured, including locations and copyright information.

In 2024, the Holy Cross Church (or the Church of the Holy Cross) was intended for demolition. The church was both historic and was the namesake for a historic urban neighborhood in Indianapolis, the Holy Cross Neighborhood. It was unanimously voted in favor of being designated a historic site.

In August 2026, an emergency meeting was held upon the intended demolition of a building on the former Martin University campus. The building is a Catholic church that is 113 years old. In this meeting, the building was voted to have historic recognition, temporarily preventing the demolition from proceeding.

== Preservation ==
The IHPC currently oversees 13 historic districts and 5 conservation areas, as well as 15 protected properties across the wider Indianapolis area.

=== Districts ===
- Chatham–Arch and Massachusetts Avenue collectively anchor downtown Indianapolis's northeast side. Chatham–Arch is a residential neighborhood on the National Register of Historic Places. Walking tours of the area are available. Massachusetts Avenue is a commercial corridor geared towards artistry and is home to multiple art galleries, jazz clubs, and vintage shops.
- Fletcher Place is a neighborhood named after Calvin Fletcher Sr, one of the first residents. The Fletcher Place Community Center was a key part of the neighborhood, supporting local families through assistance with education, finances, and food since the Great Depression.
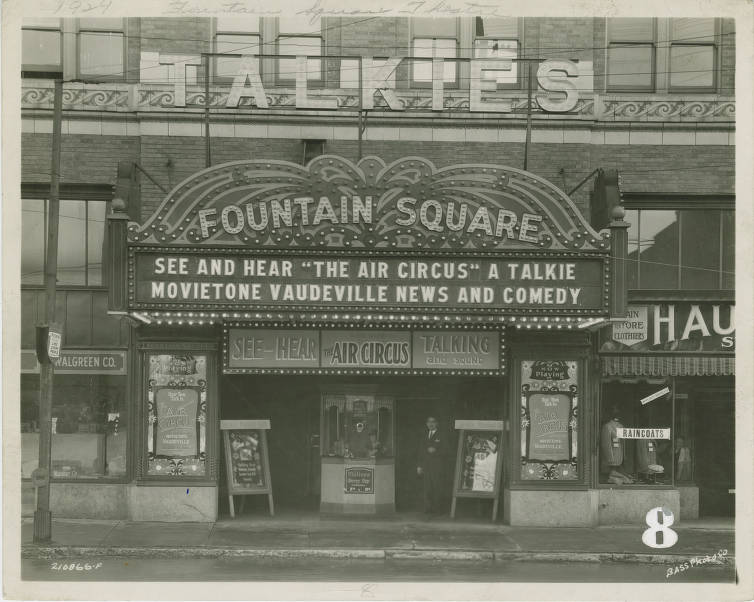
  Fountain Square Theatre marquee
- Fountain Square is a neighborhood near downtown known for its art. Historically it was a business and entertainment district, with several movie theaters, and is now an active hub for vintage and antique stores, book shops, art shows and stores, and nightlife.
- Herron–Morton Place is a neighborhood whose site was originally owned by the Indiana State Board of Agriculture and served as the site of the Indiana State Fair. During the Civil War, it was used as a training grounds for Union troops and then as a POW camp for Confederate soldiers. The southern portion of the area was the home to an art museum and school.
- Indiana World War Memorial Plaza contains the War Memorial Museum and University Park. It was originally created to honor Indiana veterans of World War I and has been expanded to honor all Indiana veterans. It was named a National Historic Landmark in 1994.
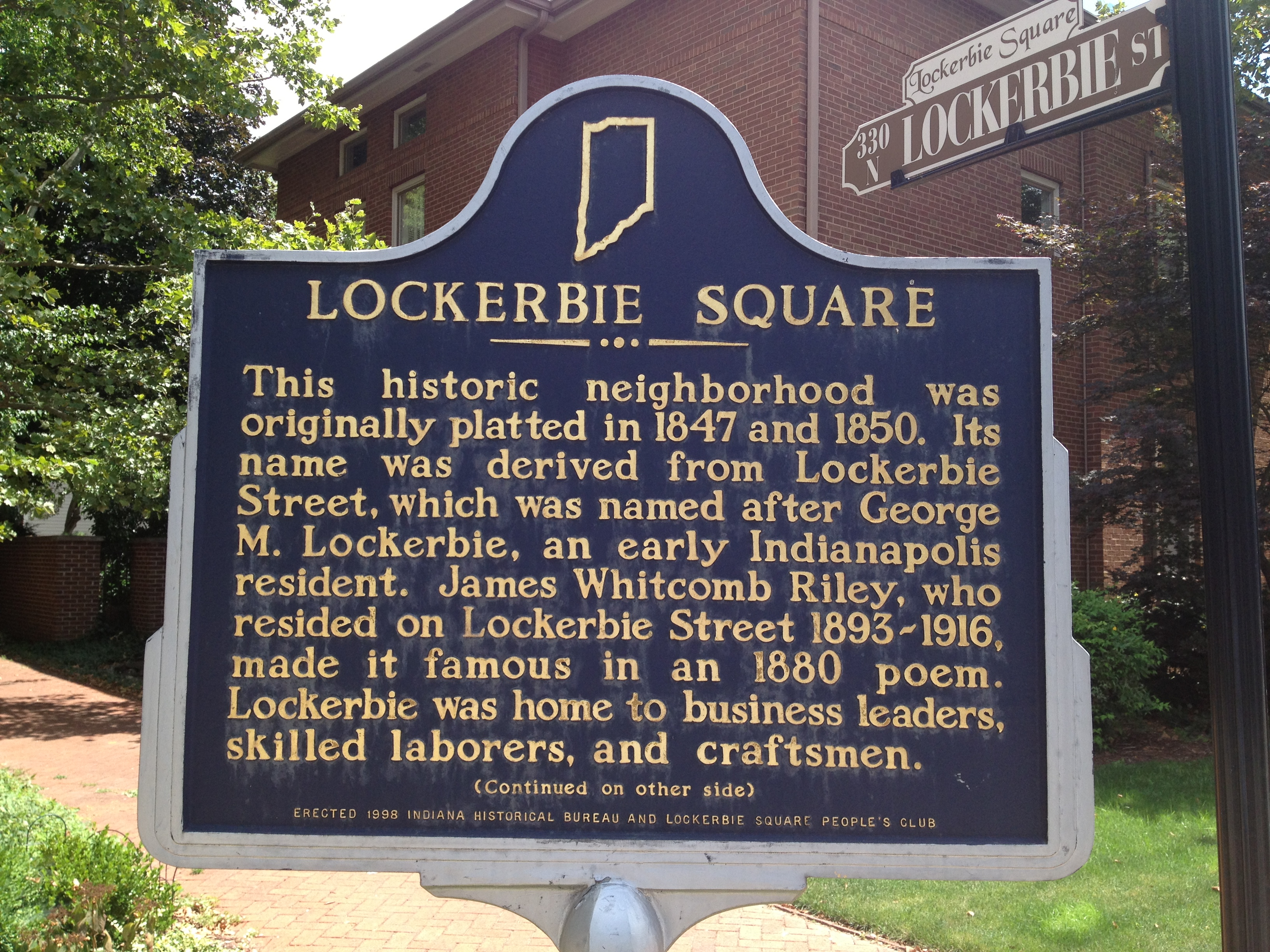
  A plaque explaining the history of Lockerbie Square
- Irvington Historic District is one of the first planned suburbs in Indianapolis and has a Romantic architecture style. It was the previous site of Butler University and was known for its art, education, and vehicle access. It is now known for its large annual Halloween festival.
- Lockefield Gardens, located near the IU campus in downtown Indianapolis, is a former 1930s housing project, the first in Indianapolis, and designed by William Earl Russ. It is an African American cultural area as well, due to it being an affordable area for Black families to move into and form communities.
- Lockerbie Square is the oldest residential neighborhood in Indianapolis. It contains the James Whitcomb Riley Museum Home, which preserves the architecture and furnishings of the home of local poet James Whitcomb Riley. Lockerbie was the name of Riley's dog.
- Monument Circle, also known as the Soldiers' and Sailors' Monument, is the center or "heart" of Downtown Indy/Circle City. Recently, a temporary park was added to provide more accessible public spaces for the city.
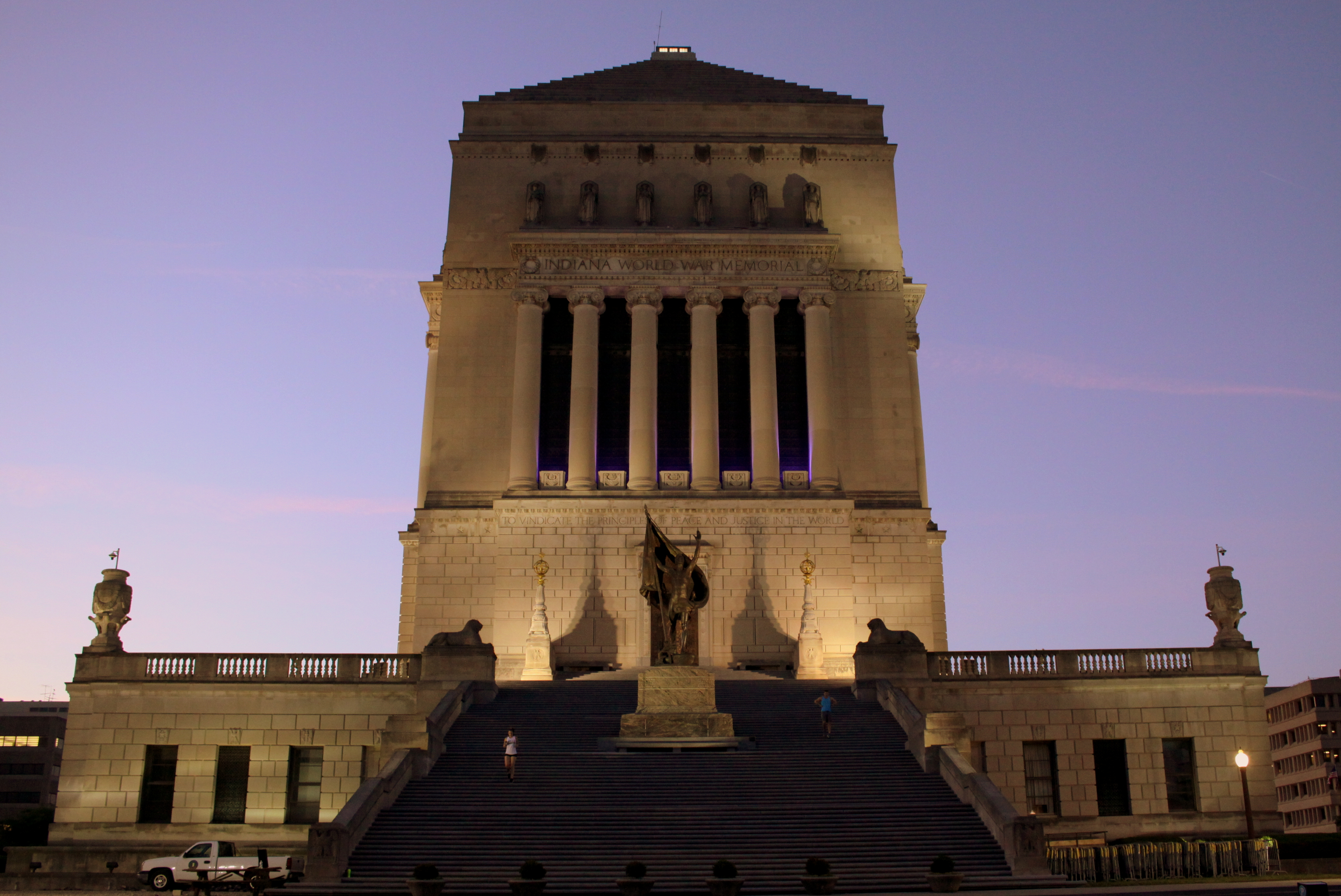
  The Indiana War Memorial at dusk
- Old Northside is a residential Indianapolis neighborhood that was named a historic district in 1978. The community was considered fashionable in the late 19th century, with many high-profile people living there, but from World War I to until the 1970s it saw a steady decline in people and activity. Efforts have been made to refurbish the houses in the neighborhood.
- St. Joseph Historic Neighborhood has a significant number of architectural styles from the Civil War era and before. The neighborhood's buildings have 15 different styles of architecture, including Italianate, Greek Revival, and Queen Anne.
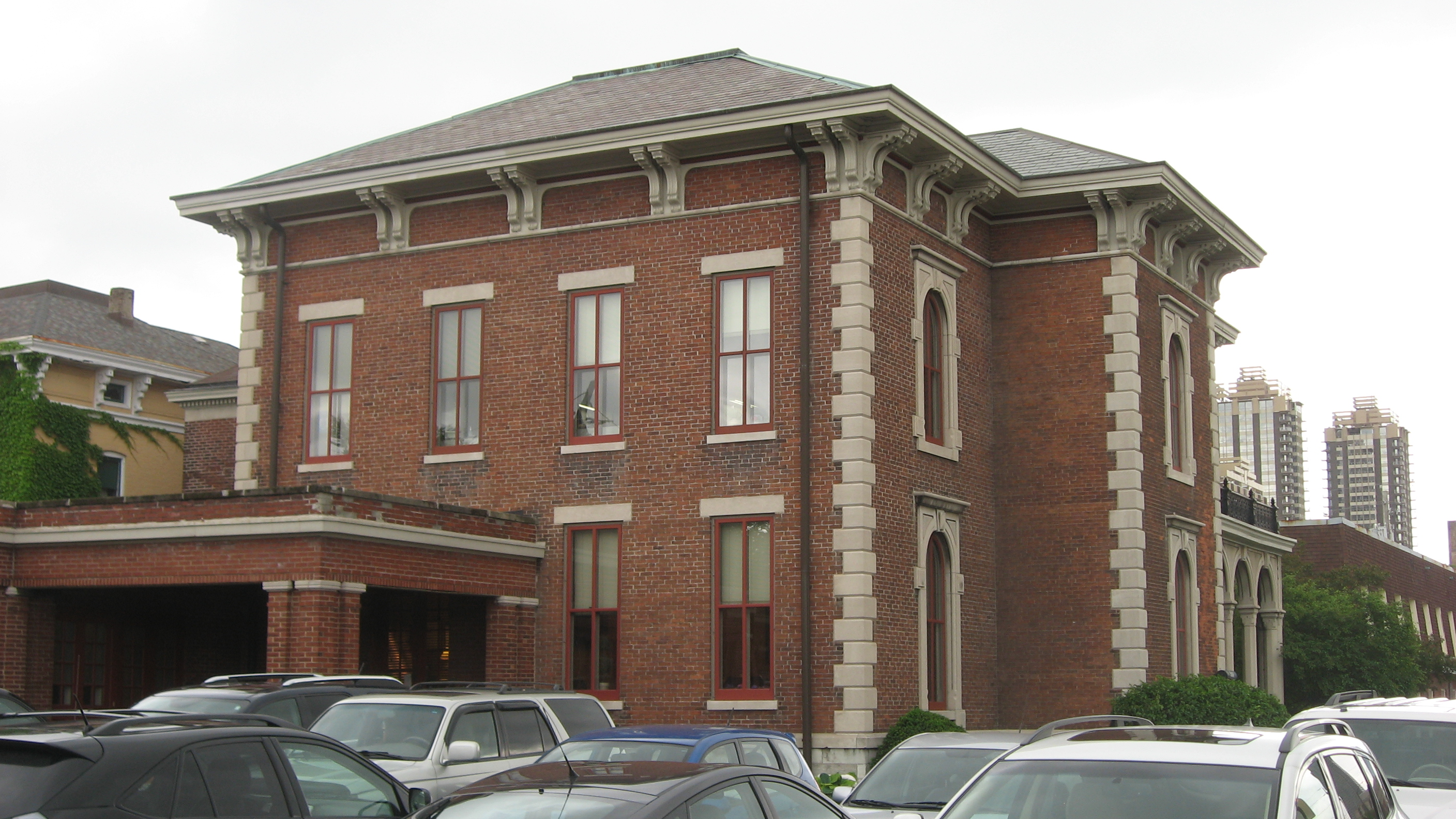
  The Bals–Wocher House in the St. Joseph neighborhood
- The Wholesale District was a key distribution hub due to presence of the Indianapolis Union Station. It is named after the wholesale businesses formerly and currently located there.
- Woodruff Place is one of the original suburbs of Indianapolis, with three esplanades that separate the west, middle, and east drives of the neighborhood. It remained an independent town until 1962, when it was annexed by the city of Indianapolis.

=== Conservation Areas ===
- Cottage Home Historical District originally included residential areas but also many work and shopping centers. It included a large German-American demographic as well as Irish-American and African-American.
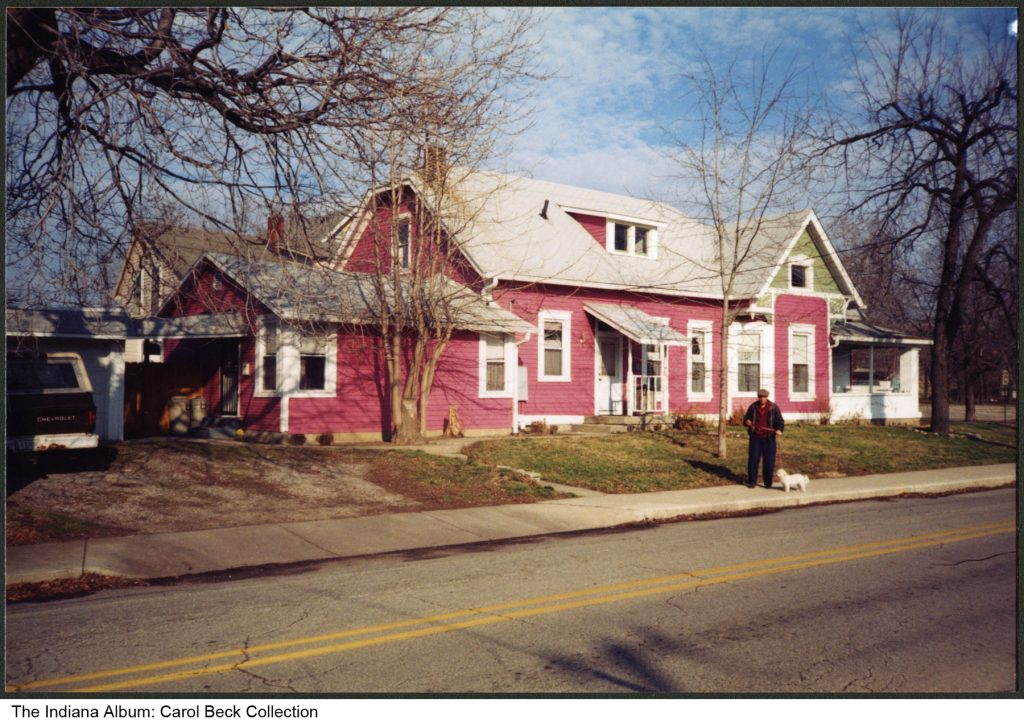
  A pink Victorian house in Cottage Home Historical District, circa 1990
- Cumberland is another district with multiple parks and hiking trails, providing natural spaces and conservation areas. It was annexed in 1968.
- Fayette Street Conservation Area is associated with both older black neighborhoods and the canal/white river. As such, it is considered a Water Landmark.
- New Augusta is a district that contains houses, shopping centers, and schools. It is a part of Pike Township, and focuses its efforts towards preserving and conserving a historic community.
- Ransom Place is a neighborhood that, in working with Keep Indianapolis Beautiful (KIBI), developed a park containing native plants and trees. The Ransom Place Neighborhood Association (RPNA) was founded to support preservation.

=== Protected Properties ===
- Askren House is a building originally housing the family of John Thomas Askren, who began building in 1828 and finished in 1850. The building now houses the Askern House Dinner Club, run by an Indiana chef.
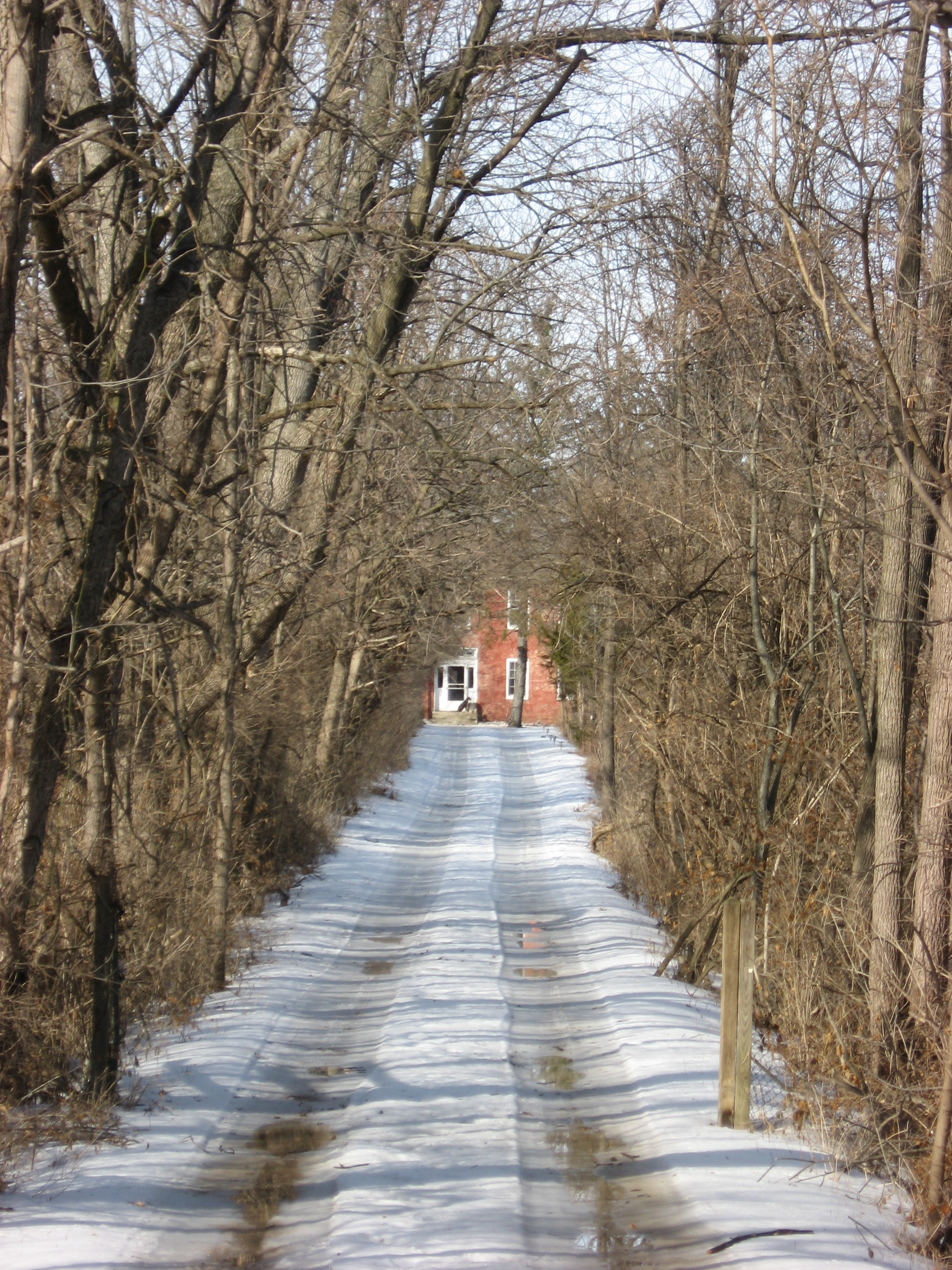
  Thomas Askren House driveway in winter
- The Church of the Holy Cross, Rectory, Gymnasium and School Building began as a school and slowly transitioned into a multi-purpose building over the years. It was built in 1896, and became fully formed by the 1980s before being shut down in 2014. Demolition has been discussed but, as of 2024, nothing has come of it.
- The Drake Apartments were luxury apartments established in 1929. In 2023, it was purchased by the city of Indianapolis from the Children's Museum of Indianapolis for $1.02 million, with votes from the IHPC. The goal is to turn them into modern, affordable apartments.
- Oldfields, or Lilly House and Gardens, is owned by the Indianapolis Museum of Art at Newfields. It was built in 1912, with expansive gardens and fountains, as well as a 22-room, 2-story manor. The house was purchased by the Lilly family in 1932, and given to the Indianapolis Art Association in 1967.
- The Gramse or the Nicholson Historical Apartment, a bungalow built in 1915, is a historic apartment building, and is currently on track to become renovated, affordable housing. It was placed on the National Register of Historic Places in 2011.
- Hannah-Oehler-Elder-House is a "haunted" house located on Madison Avenue, claimed as such due to the death of the original owner, Alexander Hannah, and his wife. It was subsequently purchased by Roman Oehler and inherited by his daughter, Romena Oehler-Elder. The Elder family worked to have it placed on the National Register of Historic Places in 1978.
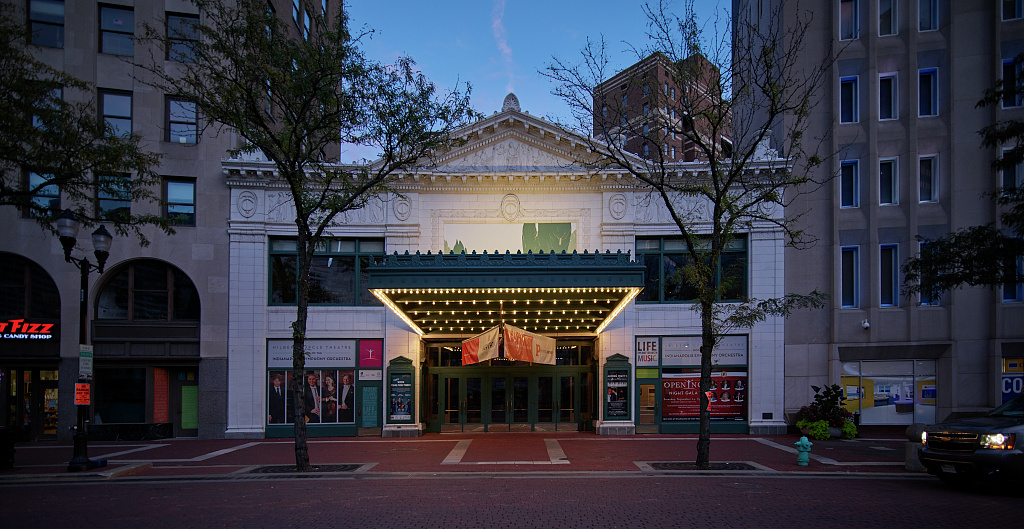
  An image of the front of the Hilbert Circle Theatre on Monument Circle at sundown
- Hilbert Circle Theatre, on Monument Circle in Downtown Indianapolis, is the home of the Indianapolis Symphony Orchestra. It is the second-oldest building in the area, having opened for business in 1916 as the Circle Theatre and renovated several times since, in the 1930s, 1980s, and was renamed in 1996.
- Hollingsworth House is a historic Indiana home built in 1954 and placed on the National Register of Historic Places in 1977. The land was purchased in 1828 and named after the buyer, George Hollingsworth. Seven rooms were added to the original four rooms in the early 1900s.
- Pierson-Griffiths House, also known as Kemper House, was purchased and created by Charles Clark Pierson as a wedding gift for his wife. After nine months, it was bought and lived in by John Lewis Griffiths until 1914, when it was purchased by Eli Lilly and named after David Jackson Kempe.
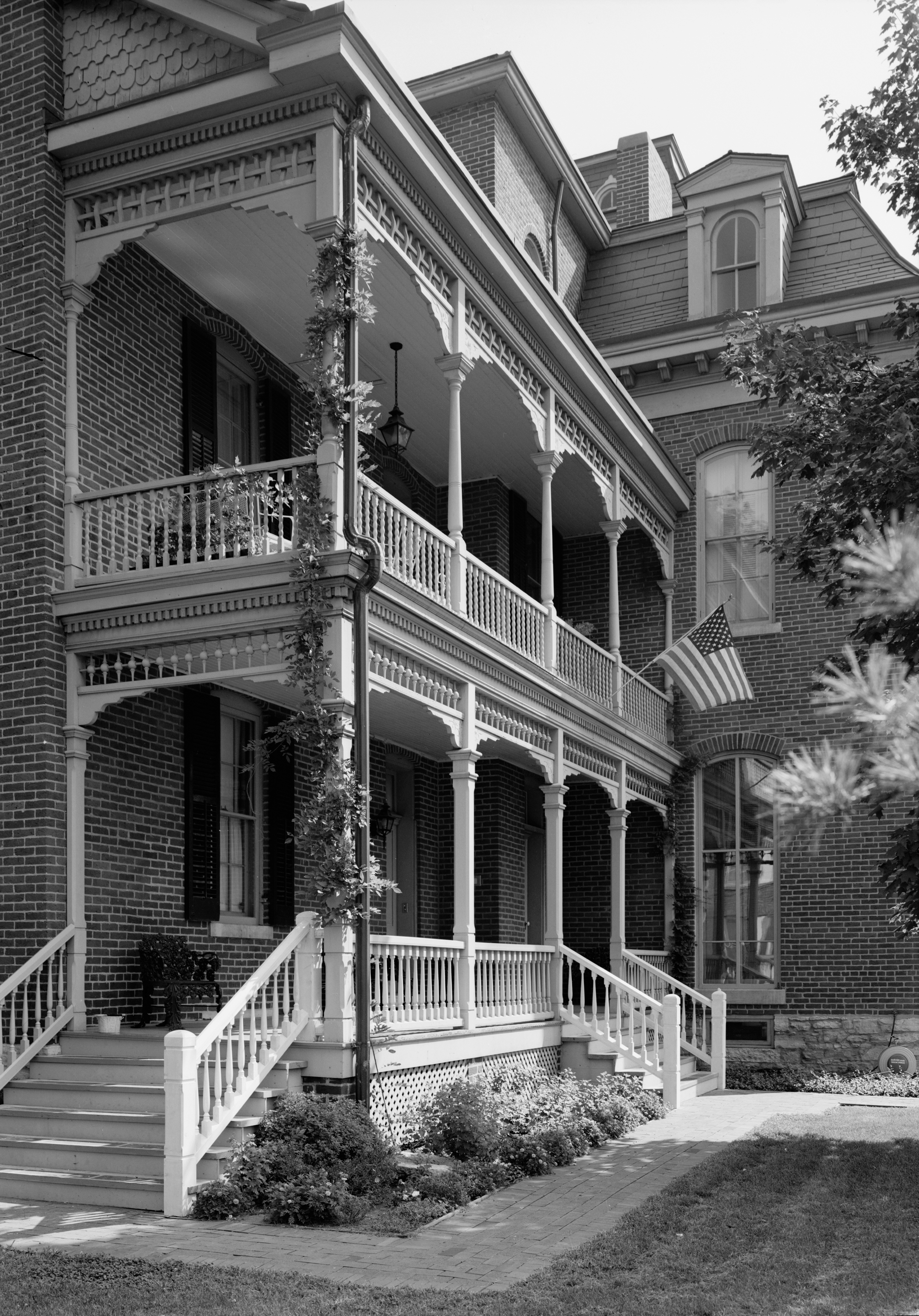
  An image from 1970 of the Morris–Butler House porch,
- Meridian Street Methodist Episcopal Church, also known as the Meridian Street United Methodist Church, was the first Methodist church in Indianapolis. The church first held services in 1819 and was formally organized n 1821. The congregation constructed its first church building in 1829, and moved several times before relocating to its current home on Meridian Street in 1947.
- Morris–Butler House was built in 1864, after being purchased by John D. Morris. It was then purchased by Noble Chase Butler in 1881 and lived in by him and his daughter. It retains rare Victorian furnishings, art, and wallpaper, and is owned by Indiana Landmarks. It is used for office spaces and can also be rented out for small events.
- Old City Hall was the Indianapolis city hall from 1909/1910 until the City-County Building opened in 1962. It later became the site of the Indiana State Museum and after that was the temporary main branch of the Indianapolis Public Library. It has not been utilized since then. The building was given a $66 million revitalization budget in April 2025.
- P.R. Mallory Company Factory was built in 1921 by the General Electric Co. and purchased in 1929 by namesake Philip Rogers Mallory. After being shut down in 1979, it was unused and empty until 2018. It received $38 million to be renovated and was transformed into a school. it was placed on the National Register of Historic Places in 2021.
- Ruskaup-Ratcliffe House and Store is a building within the Cottage Home Historical District. Frederick Ruskaup purchased land in the neighborhood, building a two-story brick building, the ground floor serving as a grocery and the second serving as a home for himself and his family. The building was expanded in 1892, and the grocery was run by the Ruskaup family until the 1950s. It was then purchased and utilized by multiple other families as pool halls, storage, and commercial space before being renovated in 2007. A pop-up vintage shop was opened in it in 2014.
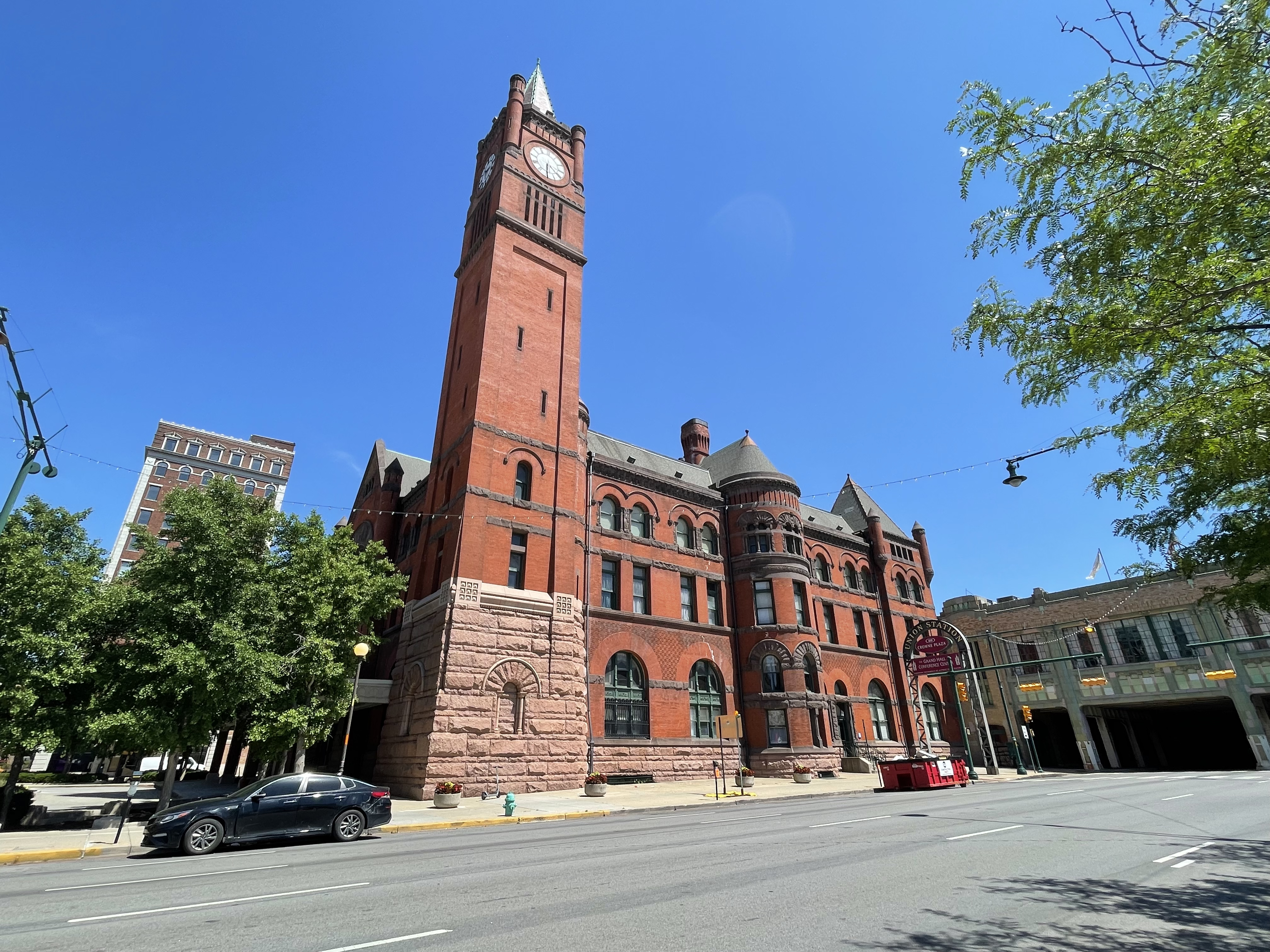
- Union Station in the Wholesale District in 2022
  Union Station Grand Hall was the first Union Station built in America, connecting multiple states and five tracks to one station. The station was open from 1853 to 1970, when it stopped being utilized. It has since been restored and was previously turned into a market with over 100 restaurants and shops. It now functions as the Indianapolis Crowne Plaza Hotel, with a Grand Hall to be rented out for events.

== See also ==
- Indiana Historical Society
- Indianapolis Cultural Districts
- List of neighborhoods in Indianapolis
- National Register of Historic Places listings in Marion County, Indiana
