= Cottage Home Historic District =

Historic district in Indiana, United States

- U.S. National Register of Historic Places
- U.S. Historic district
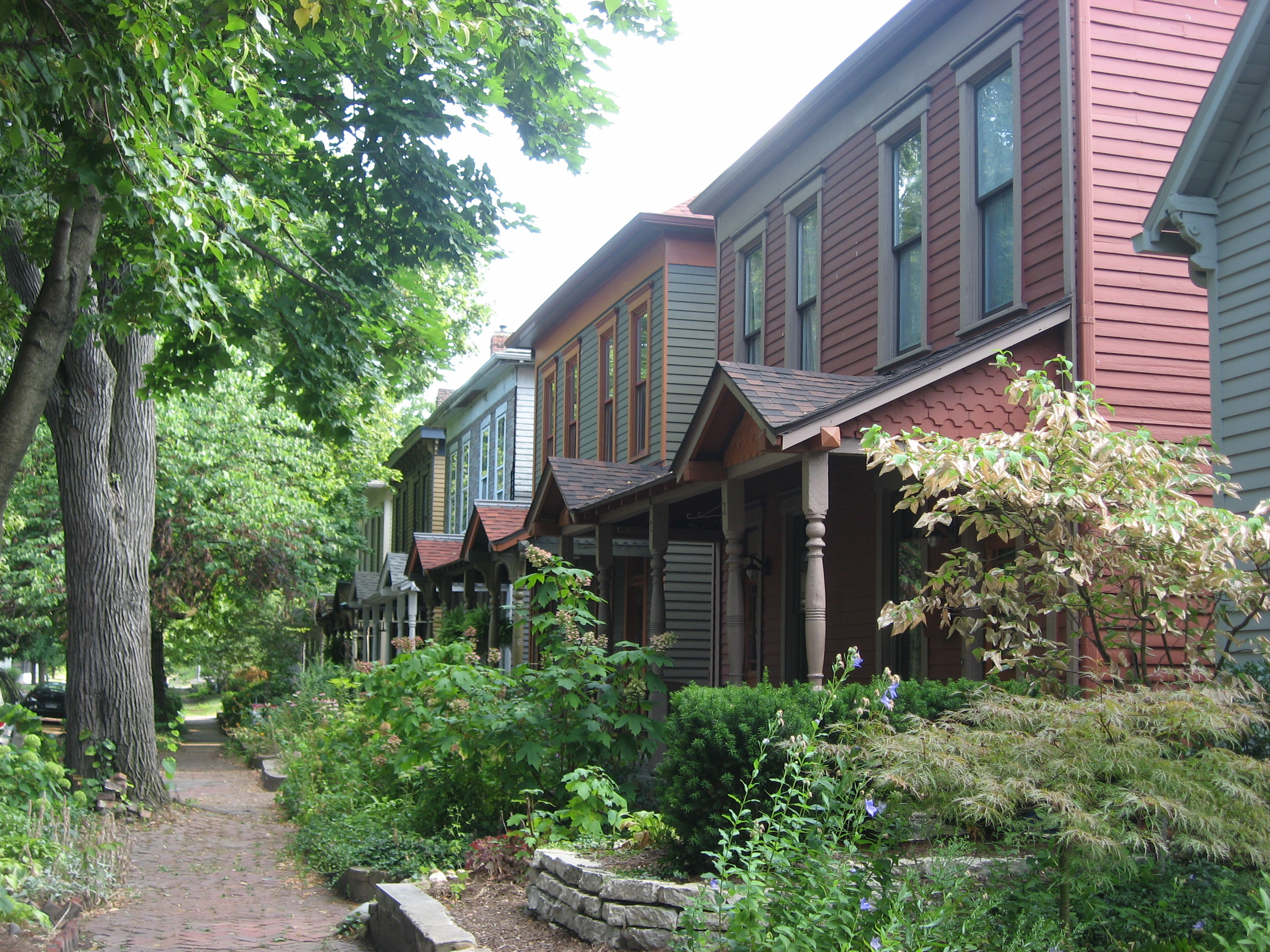
- A view of the Cottage Home Historic District from Dorman Street. Historic homes and a historic sidewalk can be seen.

- Location within Indianapolis Location within Indianapolis Location within Indiana Location within the United States
- Location: Bounded by CSX right-of-way (Dorman St) and 10th, Oriental, and Michigan Sts, Indianapolis, Indiana
- Coordinates: 39°46′37″N 86°8′18″W
- Area: 2 acres (0.81 ha) (NRHP district) approx. 76 acres (31 ha) (state district)
- Built: 1865-68
- Architect: Vonnegut & Bohn, et al.
- Architectural style: Folk Victorian, Queen Anne
- NRHP reference No.: 90000328
- Added to NRHP: February 23, 1990

The Cottage Home Historic District (also known as the Cottage Home Conservation District) is a historic district and neighborhood located on the Near Eastside of Indianapolis, Indiana, United States. A small portion of Cottage Home is listed on the National Register of Historic Places while a larger area is listed on the state and local levels.

Known for its preponderance of "cottage-style" homes built with strong Victorian influences, Cottage Home has historically been a working class neighborhood. Numerous industrial buildings are also scattered throughout the district, providing a base of economic activity. Today, however, many of these buildings are vacant, providing a special challenge to preservation and urban renewal efforts.

After a period of decline in the mid to late twentieth century, Cottage Home is now among the most desirable urban neighborhoods in the city. Key to the area's improvement was the establishment of the Cottage Home Neighborhood Association (CHNA) in 1984, whose efforts halted the razing of residential properties by local businesses, and revived interest in restoring the district's historic housing stock. The Ruskaup-Ratcliffe house and store are the most architecturally significant buildings in the district, anchoring the district's addition to the National Register in 1990. Cottage Home was further expanded to its largest bounds at the state level in 1995 and local designation of the Ruskaup-Ratcliffe house and store followed. In 2008, the state bounds, encompassing 320 parcels and 292 properties, were designated as a Conservation District by the Indianapolis Historic Preservation Commission.

== Geography ==
Cottage Home is located on the Near Eastside of Indianapolis. The neighborhood is bordered to the west by the Chatham Arch and Massachusetts Avenue Commercial District, to the north by the Windsor Park neighborhood, to the east by Arsenal Technical High School and the Woodruff Place Historic District, and to the south by the Holy Cross neighborhood. Most of the district is built on a traditional grid plan, broken up by Pogue's Run cutting across the southeast portion.

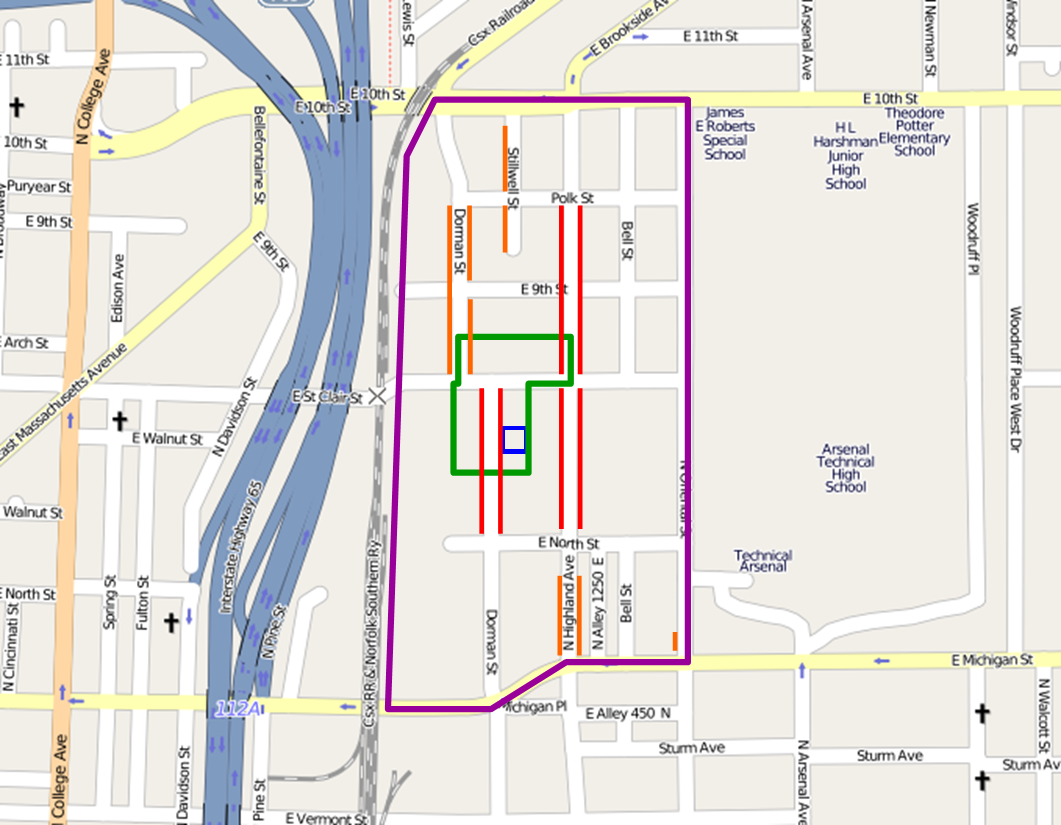
A map of Cottage Home. The purple outline is the boundary of both the state and local districts. The green outline is the boundary of the National Register district. The blue outline encloses the Ruskaup-Ratcliffe House and Store, which is excluded from the local district. The orange lines mark the locations of historic stone curbs. The red lines mark the locations of historic stone curbs and brick sidewalks.

=== National Register boundaries ===
The originally drawn boundaries of the Cottage Home Historic District, still the current boundaries of the National Register district, are much smaller than the state and locally designated boundaries. Comprising the 700 block of Dorman Street, 1102 to 1130 East St. Clair Street and 802 and 806 North Highland Avenue, 23 properties are included in the National Register district. Anchored by the Ruskaup-Ratcliffe house and store, these boundaries also include the Vonnegut & Bohn doubles and sixteen other houses. This area was listed on the National Register of Historic Places on February 23, 1990.

=== State and local boundaries ===
Cottage Home received designation as a historic district at the state level on the Indiana Register of Historic Sites and Structures in 1995 with expanded boundaries. In 2008, the neighborhood worked with the Indianapolis Historic Preservation Commission (IHPC) to develop a conservation plan and became a locally designated Conservation District, following the boundaries of the state listing. The Cottage Home Conservation District is bounded by a CSX right-of-way between I-70/I-65 and Dorman Street to the west, 10th Street to the north, Oriental Street to the east, and Michigan Street to the south. As the Ruskaup-Ratcliffe house and store had already been designated locally by the IHPC, the local boundaries do not include those two properties, while the state boundaries do. Including the Ruskaup-Ratcliffe house and store, Cottage Home contains 320 parcels and 292 buildings, over half of which are residential.

== History ==
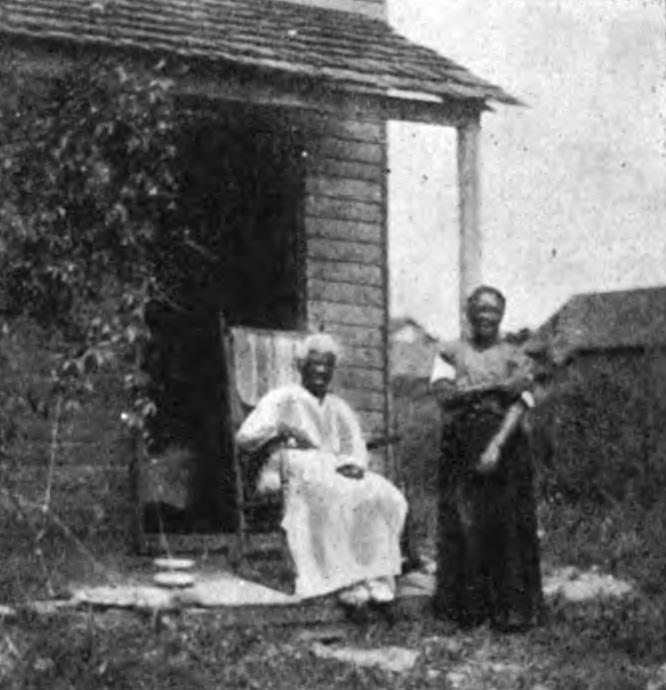
Louisa Magruder sitting in front of her home at 554 Highland Avenue.

Prior to development as an Indianapolis neighborhood, the area now known as Cottage Home was part of two farms owned by prominent Indiana citizens. The land south of St. Clair Street belonged to Noah Noble, fifth Governor of Indiana who bankrupted the State with the passage of the Indiana Mammoth Internal Improvement Act. The land north of St. Clair Street belonged to Robert Hanna, who was a member of the Indiana constitutional convention and succeeded Noble's brother James as U.S. Senator upon James's death in 1831. After the railroad reached Indianapolis in 1847, the resulting economic boom pushed the city's boundaries out beyond the Mile Square. By the end of the Civil War, the arsenal, which would later be adapted for use as Arsenal Technical High School, was built on the eastern border of Cottage Home and the streetcar reached St. Clair Street just a few blocks to the west, providing access to jobs for the area's residents. The Noble farm was platted in 1865 and the Hanna farm in 1868, and both additions were annexed to the City of Indianapolis in 1870.

After annexation, Cottage Home experienced strong growth in housing. Almost 400 households were located in the area by 1900, nearly three-quarters of which were being rented. Initially, most of the residents of Cottage Home were immigrant families or African American, though that percentage steadily declined into the twentieth century. Among these early residents was Louisa Magruder, daughter of Tom Magruder, the slave of Gov. Noble who is said to be the titular inspiration for Uncle Tom's Cabin. This strong growth in housing and population was accompanied by an expansion in the commercial and industrial sectors, due to the neighborhood's proximity to the railroad and streetcar. By 1915, new construction largely ended, and the architectural character of the area was established.

Indianapolis continued to experience strong growth through the 1960s and 70s, but the population of Cottage Home and other inner-city neighborhoods was reduced by migration to the suburbs in the process of urban sprawl. As Cottage Home was within the flood zone of Pogue's Run, residents began to leave for other areas. In addition, I-70/I-65's construction required demolishing homes on the west side of the neighborhood, leaving it bordered with a high-traffic roadway. By the 1980s, more than 100 houses had been demolished in Cottage Home. A renewed interest in historic restoration and the establishment of the Cottage Home Neighborhood Association (CHNA) in 1984 reversed the demolition trend; the area has since lost only six homes to fire or demolition. CHNA led the effort for the unique neighborhood to be designated as a historic district, achieving addition to the National Register of Historic Places in 1990, the State Register in 1995, and city designation in 2008. Today, while infill has been slow, the neighborhood continues as a vibrant and active community.

== Architecture ==
Cottage Home derives its name from a subdivision in the northern part of the neighborhood. It is also the predominant form of architecture in the district, Queen Anne and Folk Victorian-style cottages. All historic residential properties fall under these styles, with the notable exception of the Ruskaup-Ratcliffe house, which combines Romanesque Revival features with Queen Anne architecture. Commercial and industrial buildings in the district were usually built either in the Italianate tradition or the Art Deco style, depending on their age.

Residences in Cottage Home are typified by spindlework porches, turned posts, gable ornaments, variegated and fishscale shingling and gingerbread trim, features often found in Queen Anne and Folk Victorian homes. These types of detailing were placed on simple folk homes as an inexpensive way to provide varied design and personalization. This practice was common in Victorian-era working-class neighborhoods such as Cottage Home.

== Notable features ==
As a working-class neighborhood, Cottage Home comprises primarily modest residential designs, with the notable exception of the Ruskaup-Ratcliffe house. A rich history as a thriving Indianapolis neighborhood, however, gives the district additional significance. Below are a few of the most notable properties and features of Cottage Home.

=== Ruskaup-Ratcliffe House and Store ===
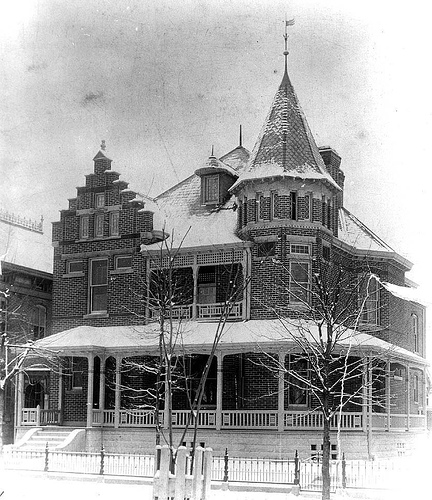
The Ruskaup-Ratcliffe House in the early 1890s.

The architectural focal point of Cottage Home, the Ruskaup-Ratcliffe House and Store were both built by Frederick Ruskaup. Ruskaup was a German immigrant who came to the United States in 1869 at the age of 25. By 1875, he purchased two lots on Dorman Street in present-day Cottage Home. At 713 Dorman Street, he opened a grocery store and the Ruskaup family lived upstairs. He added as L-shaped addition to the north and east of the store in 1885. The success of his grocery store and many rental properties allowed Ruskaup in 1892 to hire the prominent Indianapolis architecture firm Vonnegut & Bohn to design a house for his family next door at 711 Dorman Street. Descendants of Frederick Ruskaup lived at the house and operated the store until 1957, when it was sold to the Ratcliffe sisters. The properties were sold again in the 1980s to their current owner. The house has been restored and the store has had extensive facade improvements.

The Ruskaup grocery store was built in the Italianate style, common to Midwestern buildings in the 1870s. Attic windows and decorative brackets in the cornice line give the store detail accentuating the first-floor stone pilasters and second-story window hoods.

The architects combined Romanesque Revival details with Queen Anne architecture to create a unique style for the Ruskaup-Ratcliffe House. As Romanesque Revival drew inspiration from traditional German architecture, it was popular among German immigrants such as Frederick Ruskaup. Vonnegut & Bohn, ethnic German Americans, drew from German influences, as evidenced by their later masterpiece, the Athenæum (Das Deutsche Haus). In contrast to the neighboring store, and reflective of the houses being constructed on Dorman Street, the architects drew on the mainstream Queen Anne style for the basic massing of the house. This is shown in the asymmetrical facade, with a wrap-around porch and tower. The Romanesque Revival is expressed in the varied window sizes, stone detailing in the cornice and window hoods, and a stepped front gable. The interior is equally impressive, featuring inlaid floors and a cartouche above the entryways to the stairwell and dining room, all trademarks of Vonnegut & Bohn designs. The original imported stained glass windows were removed from the house in the early 1980s.

=== Vonnegut & Bohn Doubles, 702-720 Dorman Street ===
Another legacy of Frederick Ruskaup, the series of duplexes known as the Vonnegut & Bohn Doubles provide great historic and architectural significance to the National Register district and neighborhood as a whole. In 1888, Ruskaup's business success prompted him to build a series of several duplexes as rental properties. Most of the doubles, as well as two cottages in the 700 block of Dorman Street burned to the ground in October 1890. Ruskaup quickly rebuilt, including brick fire walls in the three southernmost doubles across from his grocery store and future house.

The architecture firm of Vonnegut & Bohn was hired to design the houses, who Ruskaup later hired to build his own house. However, in contrast to the Ruskaup-Ratcliffe House and other Vonnegut & Bohn buildings, these duplexes possess a more mainstream Italianate appearance. Symmetrical facades, hipped roofs, and full-length, gabled spindlework porches are common to the Queen Anne style and all five duplexes.

The Vonnegut & Bohn Doubles are also notable, along with the Ruskaup-Ratcliffe House, as the oldest extant Vonnegut & Bohn-designed residences in Indianapolis.

=== Dorman Street Saloon, 901 Dorman Street ===
While architecturally plain, the Dorman Street Saloon has long played an important role in the lives of Cottage Home residents. The corner structure was originally built as a house in the early 1870s. Operating as a grocery in the 1910s, the business became a bar in the late 1910s. After the end of Prohibition, it was known as Anacker's 9th Street Tavern, The Mahogany Bar (still nicknamed "The Hog"), and May's Lounge, the Dorman Street Saloon has served for years as a popular neighborhood meeting place. A popular rumor claims that infamous criminal John Dillinger frequented the Dorman Street Saloon while preparing for his heist of the Massachusetts Avenue State Bank, only a couple blocks away.

=== Kroger Grocery & Bakery Company Building ===
At 200,000 square feet (19,000 m^{2}), the Kroger Grocery & Bakery Company Building is easily the largest building in Cottage Home. In 1929, the expanding Kroger Grocery & Bakery Company constructed this warehouse to meet the growing demands of its Indianapolis stores. Large casement windows and pilasters are among the features of this Art Deco industrial building. Today, the building houses the corporate headquarters of Marian, Inc. and is often used as a meeting place for the Cottage Home Neighborhood Association.

=== Sidewalks and curbs ===
When Cottage Home was built, high-quality brick sidewalks and limestone curbs lined the streets. Today, some of these sidewalks and curbs remain and are cherished by the neighborhood as important features of the historic district. Brick sidewalks remain on portions of Highland Avenue and Dorman Street, including in front of the Ruskaup-Ratcliffe house and store. Stone curbs can still be found on portions of Highland Avenue, Dorman Street, Stillwell Street, and Oriental Street.

== Neighborhood ==
The Cottage Home Neighborhood Association has sponsored an annual block party since 1984, which has several times been named the best block party of Indianapolis by local alt weekly NUVO. Cottage Home also participates in Near East Side Community Organization (NESCO), a coalition of near east side Indianapolis neighborhoods and not-for-profits promoting community development. Residents of Cottage Home are within the bounds of Indianapolis Public Schools, attending Washington Irving Elementary School, Emma Donnan Middle School, and Arsenal Technical High School.

== See also ==
- Indianapolis Cultural Districts
- List of neighborhoods in Indianapolis
- National Register of Historic Places listings in Center Township, Marion County, Indiana
