= William Buschmann Block =

- U.S. National Register of Historic Places
- U.S. Historic district – Contributing property
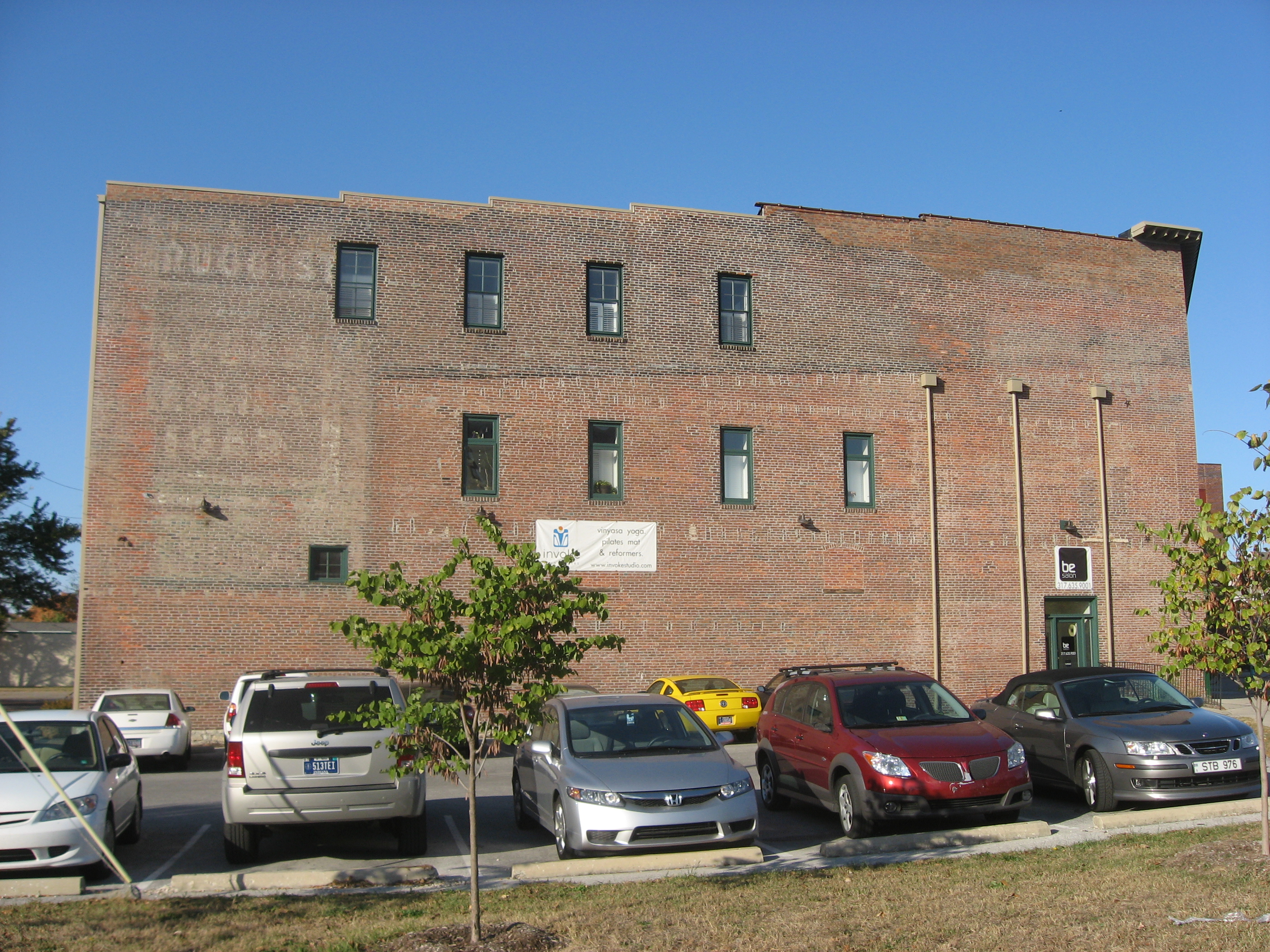
- William Buschmann Block, October 2010

- Location within Indianapolis Location within Indiana Location within the United States
- Location: 968-972 Fort Wayne Ave., Indianapolis, Indiana
- Coordinates: 39°46′51″N 86°9′0″W
- Area: 0.3 acres (0.12 ha)
- Built: 1870-1871, c. 1879
- Architectural style: Italianate
- NRHP reference No.: 88001225
- Added to NRHP: August 26, 1988

William Buschmann Block, also known as the Buschmann Block, is a historic commercial building located at Indianapolis, Indiana. It was built in 1870–1871, and is a three-story, L-shaped, Italianate style brick building. It was enlarged with a four-story wing about 1879. It sits on a rubble foundation and has round arched openings with limestone lintels. The building originally housed a retail and wholesale grocery business.

It was listed on the National Register of Historic Places in 1988. It is located in the St. Joseph Neighborhood Historic District.

== See also ==
- National Register of Historic Places listings in Center Township, Marion County, Indiana
