= Hollingsworth House =

Historic house in Indiana, United States

- U.S. National Register of Historic Places
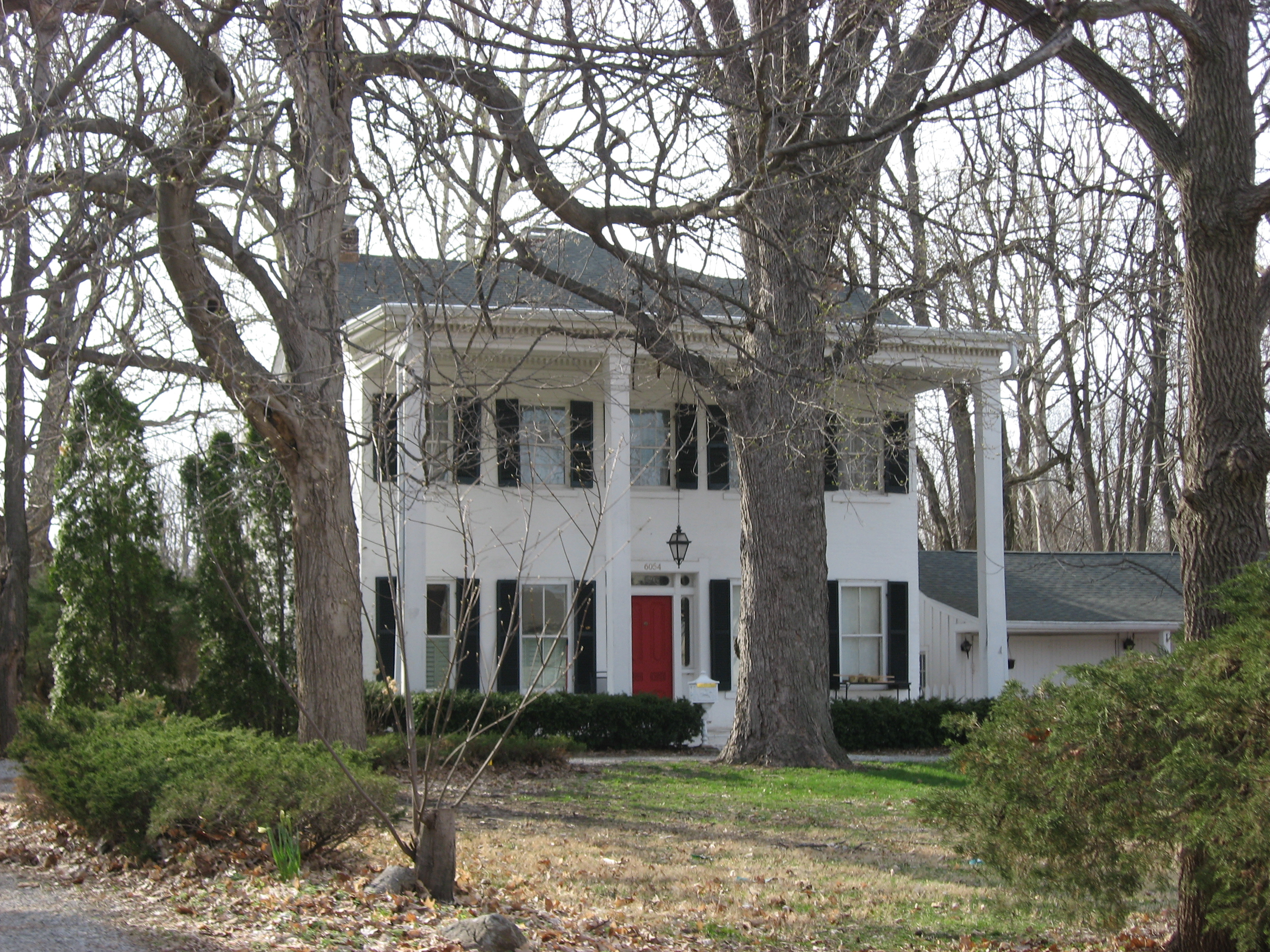
- Hollingsworth House, March 2011

- Location within Indianapolis Location within Indiana Location within the United States
- Location: 6054 Hollingsworth Rd., Indianapolis, Indiana
- Coordinates: 39°51′51″N 86°14′50″W
- Area: less than one acre
- Built: 1854
- Architectural style: Federal
- NRHP reference No.: 77000019
- Added to NRHP: April 13, 1977

Hollingsworth House is a historic home located at Indianapolis, Indiana. It was built in 1854, and is a two-story, five-bay, Federal style frame dwelling. A seven-room addition was constructed in 1906 or 1908. The front facade features a two-story, full width, portico.

It was added to the National Register of Historic Places in 1977.

== See also ==
- Indianapolis Historic Preservation Commission
- National Register of Historic Places listings in Marion County, Indiana
