= Thomas Askren House =

Historic house in Indiana, United States

- U.S. National Register of Historic Places
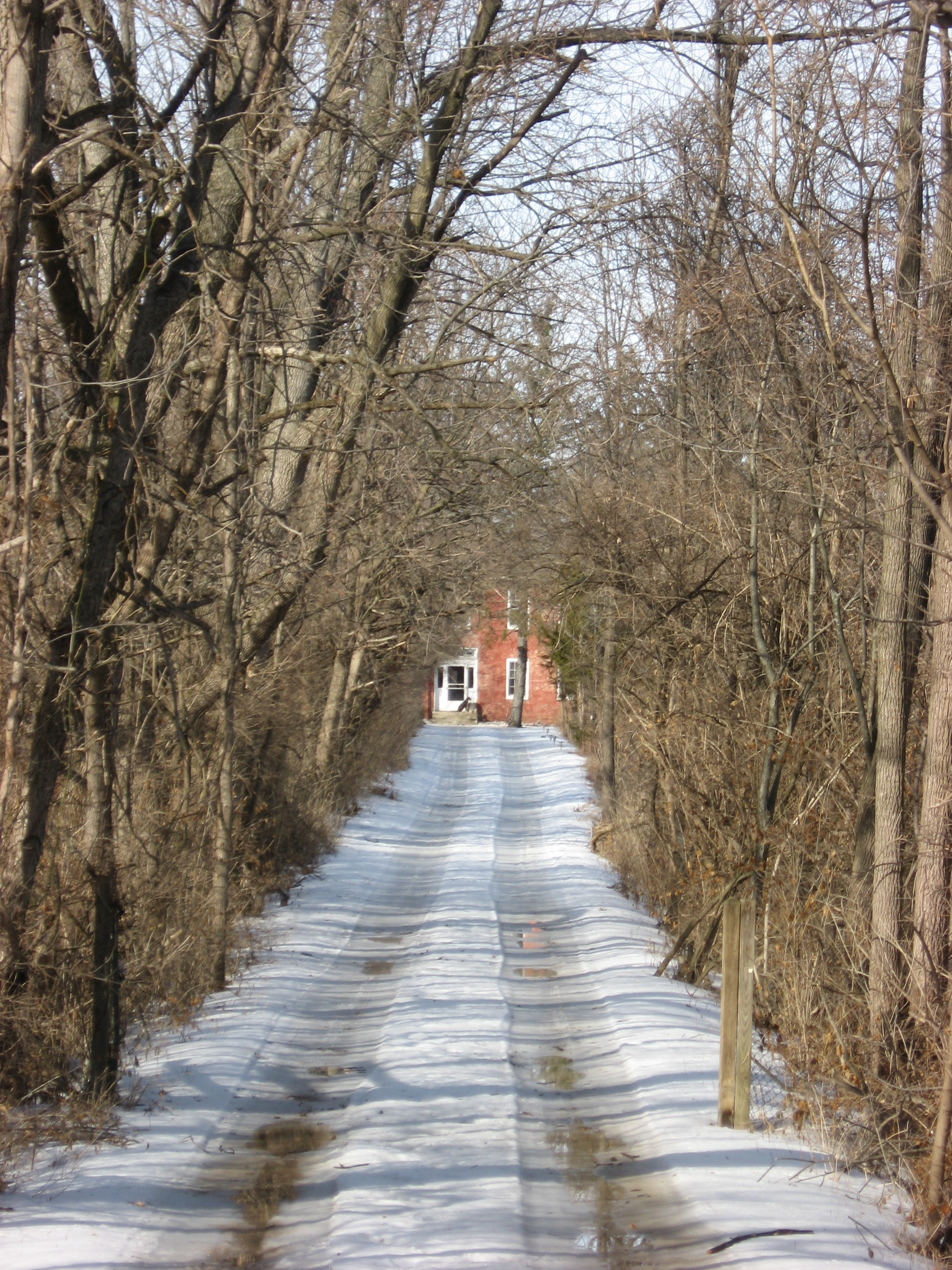
- Thomas Askren House, February 2011

- Location within Indianapolis Location within Indiana Location within the United States
- Location: 6550 E. 16th St., Indianapolis, Indiana
- Coordinates: 39°47′36″N 86°3′13″W
- Area: less than one acre
- Built: c. 1828-1833
- Architectural style: Federal, I-house
- NRHP reference No.: 06000303
- Added to NRHP: April 19, 2006

Thomas Askren House is a historic home located in Indianapolis, Indiana. It was built between about 1828 and 1833, and is a two-story, Federal style brick I-house. It has a side gable roof and a rear ell. Also on the property is a contributing outbuilding.

It was added to the National Register of Historic Places in 2006.

== See also ==
- Indianapolis Historic Preservation Commission
- National Register of Historic Places listings in Marion County, Indiana
