= Delaware Court =

- U.S. National Register of Historic Places
- U.S. Historic district – Contributing property
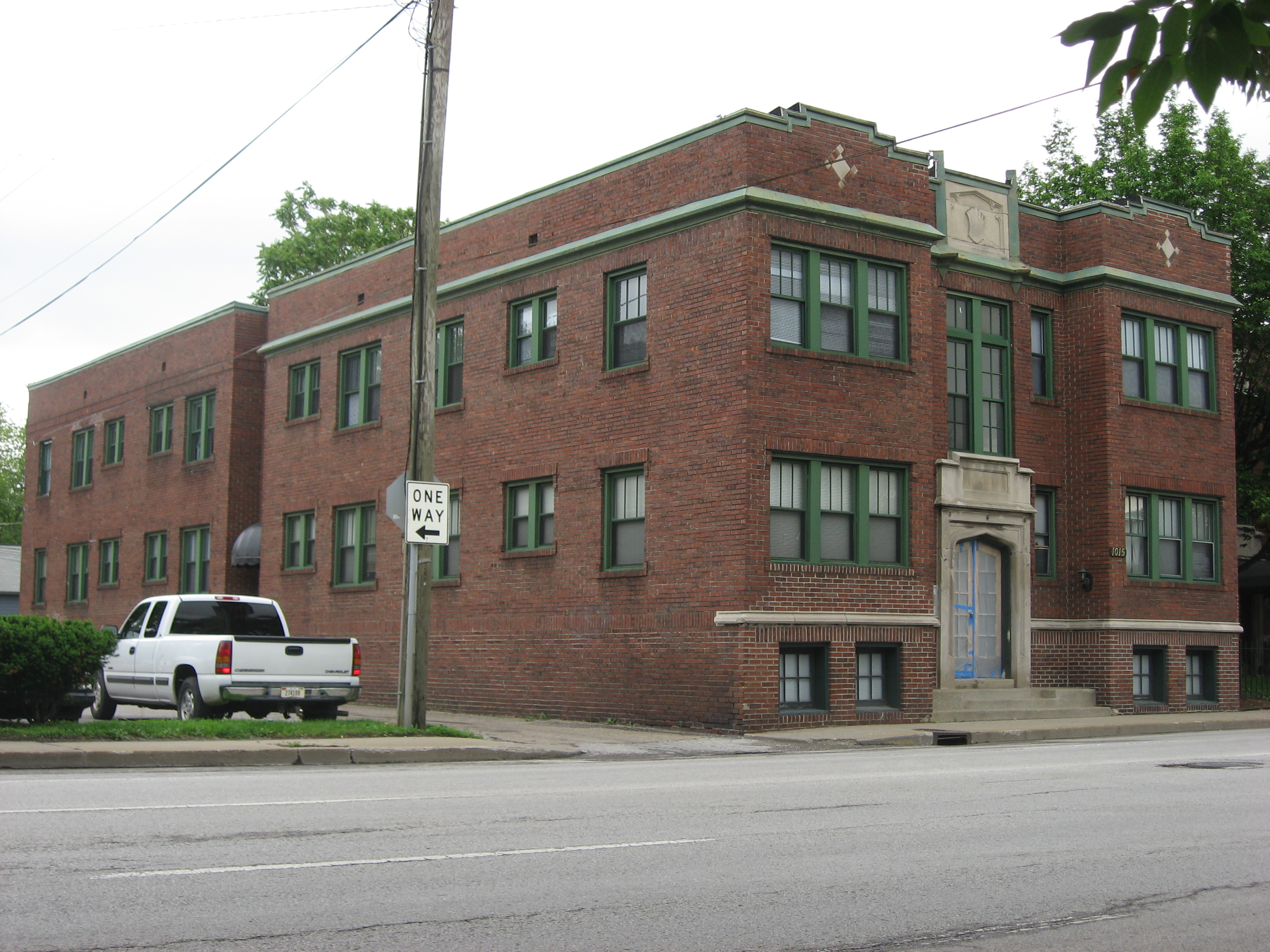
- Delaware Court Apartments, May 2010

- Location within Indianapolis Location within Indiana Location within the United States
- Location: 1001-1015 N. Delaware St., Indianapolis, Indiana
- Coordinates: 39°46′52″N 86°9′13″W
- Area: less than one acre
- Built: 1917
- Built by: Brown, George W.
- Architectural style: Tudor Revival
- MPS: Apartments and Flats of Downtown Indianapolis TR
- NRHP reference No.: 83000065
- Added to NRHP: September 15, 1983

Delaware Court is a historic apartment building located at Indianapolis, Indiana. It was built in 1917, and is a two-story, E-shaped, Tudor Revival style red brick and grey limestone building on a raised basement. It features a flattened Tudor arched entrance, stepped gables and limestone plaques with heraldic escutcheons.

It was listed on the National Register of Historic Places in 1983. It is located in the St. Joseph Neighborhood Historic District.

== See also ==
- Apartments and Flats of Downtown Indianapolis Thematic Resources
- National Register of Historic Places listings in Center Township, Marion County, Indiana
