= Fayette Street Conservation Area =

Conservation area in Indianapolis, US

Coordinates: 39°46′49″N 86°10′01″W

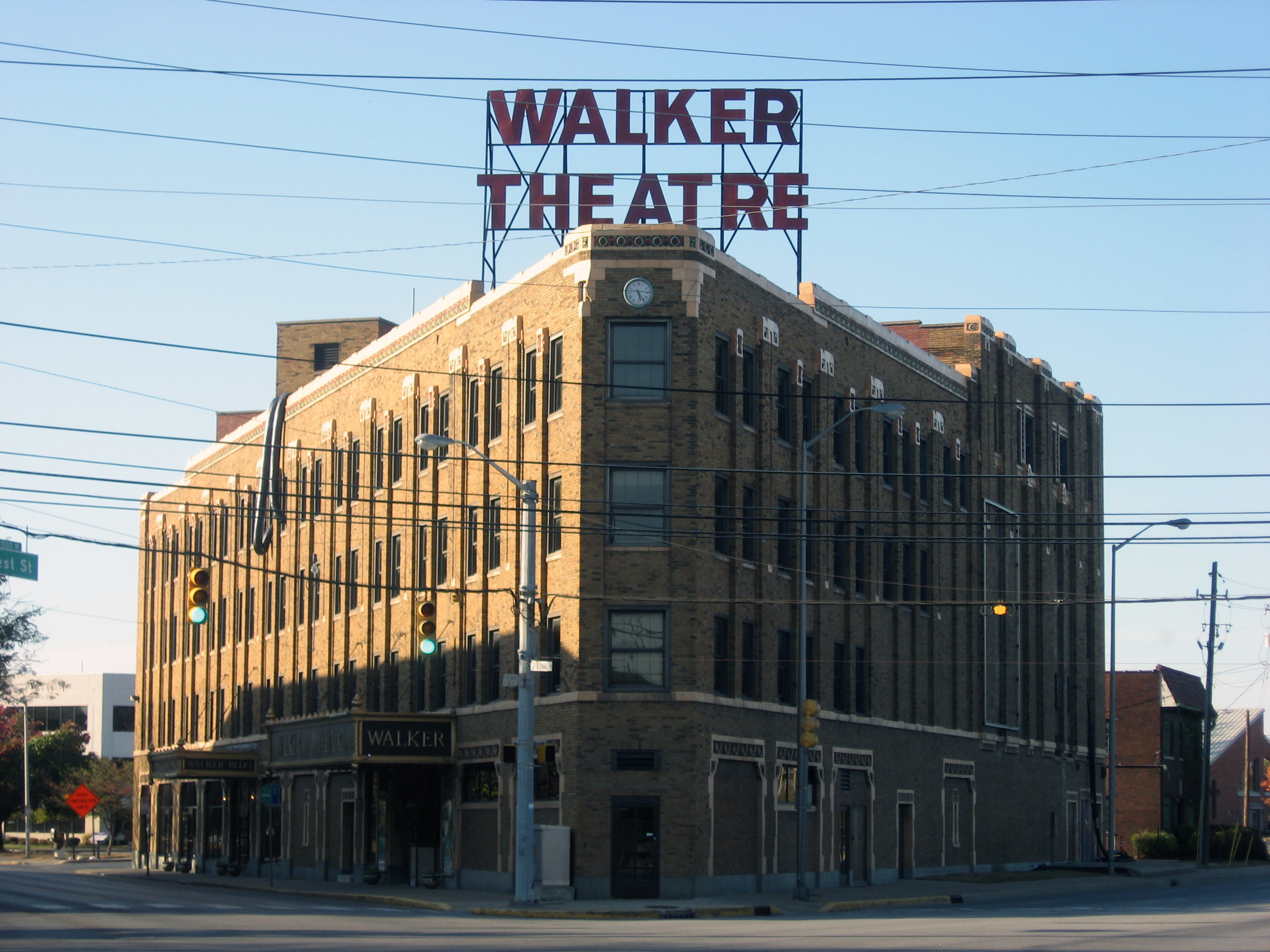
- Madam Walker Legacy Center at West/MLK Jr. Street and Indiana Avenue
- Interactive map of Fayette Street Conservation Area
- Location: Bounded by 9th, 10th, Martin Luther King Jr., and North Missouri streets; near White River and Central Canal.

Fayette Street Conservation Area is a local historic district on the northwest side of downtown Indianapolis in the U.S. state of Indiana. The small district overlaps with larger national historic districts, including Indiana Avenue and Lockefield Gardens.

Fayette Street is situated immediately off the I-65 interchange with MLK/West Streets near the IU Indianapolis campus. Much of the campus's land was taken from the original neighborhood. It is associated with the White River/Central Canal area as one of the few early settlements for black migrants to the area beginning in the 19th century. It is also part of the Historic Urban Neighborhoods of Indianapolis (HUNI). It is listed as a "Water Landmark" by the American Water Works Association, and as a Historic District in the Indianapolis Historic Preservation Commission (IHPC). It was established as a historic district in 1995.

Fayette Street is about one mile west of the Mass Ave Cultural Arts District. Its boundaries are 9th Street, 10th Street, Dr. Martin Luther King Jr. Street and North Missouri Street. It was first designed in the 1800s, and reuptake began in 1995, when it was also by the IHPC.

Some landmarks in its immediate vicinity include the Madam Walker Legacy Center, the Kurt Vonnegut Museum and Library, and the USS Indianapolis National Memorial. A revitalization effort was designed for the neighborhood due to the deterioration.
