= The Gramse =

- U.S. National Register of Historic Places
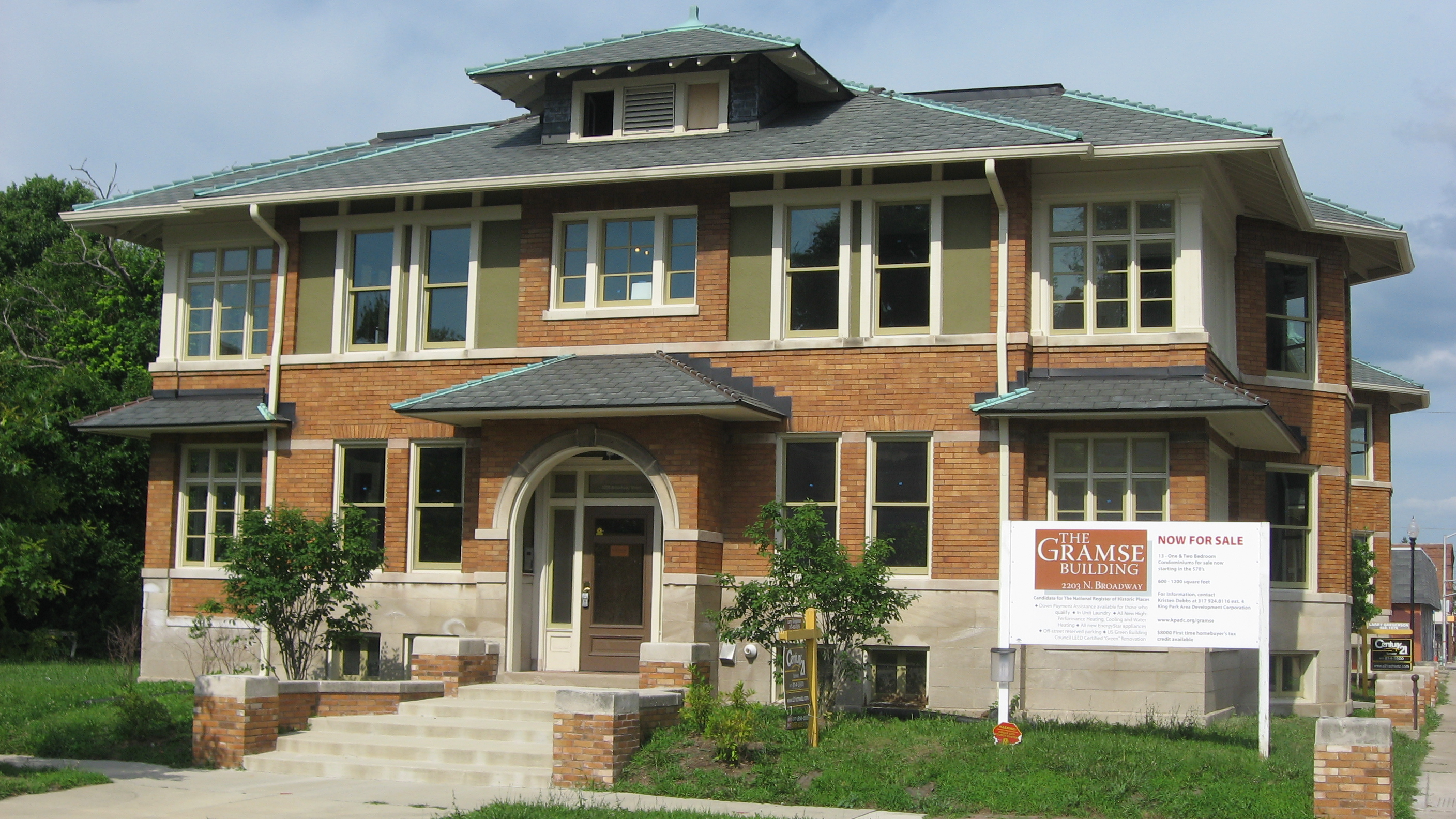
- The Gramse, July 2011

- Location within Indianapolis Location within Indiana Location within the United States
- Location: 2203 N. Broadway St., Indianapolis, Indiana
- Coordinates: 39°47′52″N 86°08′46″W
- Area: Less than 1 acre (0.40 ha)
- Built: 1915
- Architect: Foltz, Herbert W.
- Architectural style: Bungalow/craftsman
- NRHP reference No.: 11000384
- Added to NRHP: June 23, 2011

The Gramse, also known as The Nicholson, historic apartment building located at Indianapolis, Indiana. It was built in 1915, and is a two-story, Bungalow / American Craftsman style, yellow brick and limestone building on a raised brick basement. It has a cross-hipped roof with dormers. It features stuccoed section and decorative half-timbering, three-sided bay windows, and corner porches. The building has been converted to condominiums.

It was listed on the National Register of Historic Places in 2011.

== See also ==
- Indianapolis Historic Preservation Commission
- National Register of Historic Places listings in Center Township, Marion County, Indiana
