= Cumberland, Indiana =

- Town
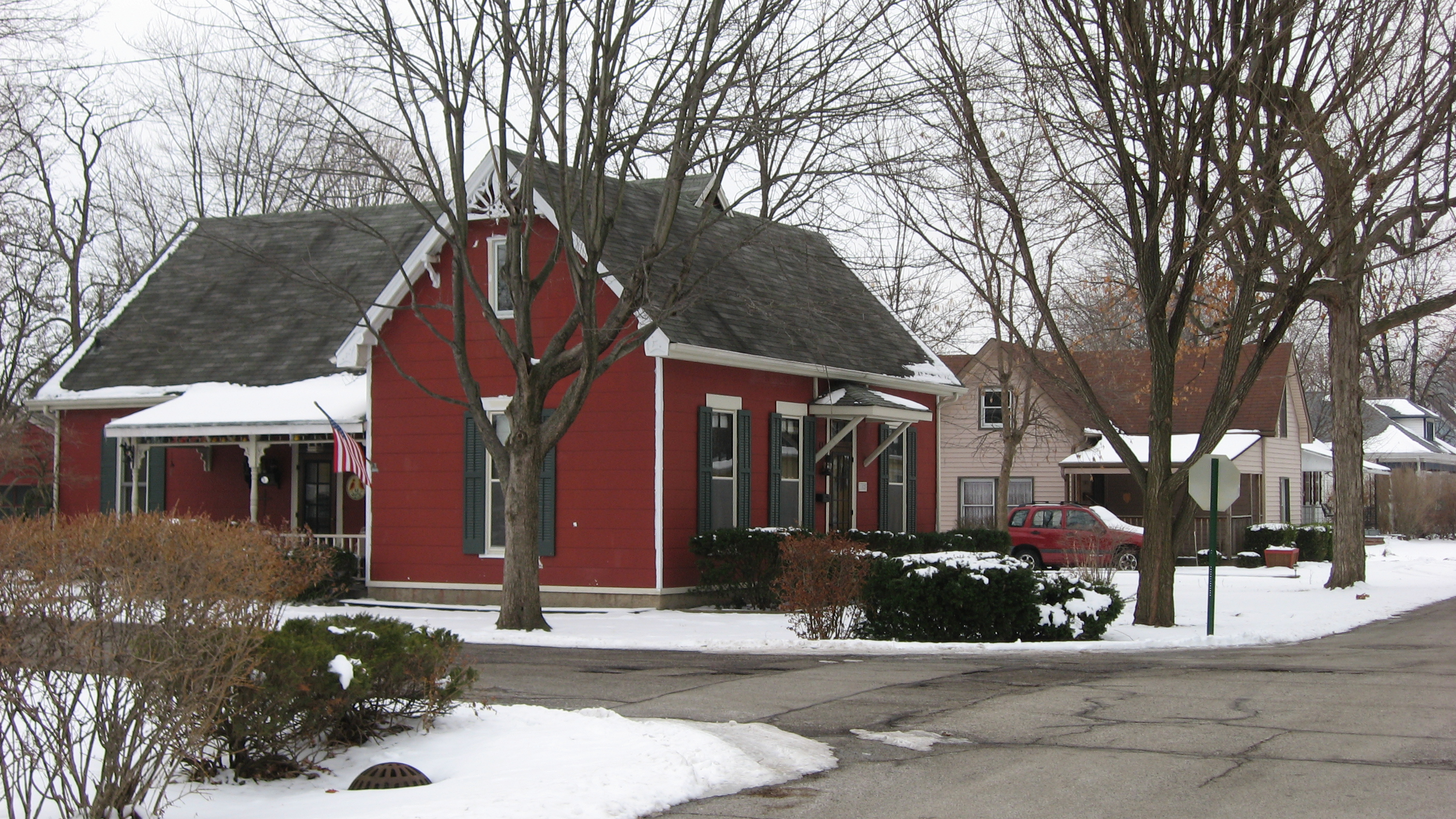
- A residential neighborhood in northern Cumberland

- Seal

- Location in Hancock County and Marion County, Indiana
- Coordinates: 39°47′04″N 85°56′45″W
- Country: United States
- State: Indiana
- Counties: Hancock, Marion
- Townships: Buck Creek, Sugar Creek, Warren
- Founded: July 7, 1831
- Incorporated: 1951
- Consolidated with Unigov: 1970

Area
  - Total: 2.82 sq mi (7.30 km^{2})
  - Land: 2.81 sq mi (7.28 km^{2})
  - Water: 0.0077 sq mi (0.02 km^{2})
- Elevation: 833 ft (254 m)

Population (2020)
  - Total: 5,954
  - Density: 2,118.4/sq mi (817.93/km^{2})
- Time zone: UTC-5 (EST)
  - Summer (DST): UTC-4 (EST)
- ZIP code: 46229
- Area code: 317
- FIPS code: 18-16336
- GNIS feature ID: 2396672
- Website: www.town.cumberland.in.us

Cumberland is a town in Hancock and Marion counties, Indiana, United States. The population was 5,954 at the 2020 census, up from 5,169 in 2010.

== History ==
Cumberland is named after the city in Maryland and was platted on July 7, 1831 when the Cumberland Road (also known as the National Road) was extended to that point. Cumberland contained a post office from 1834 until it was discontinued in 1958. Cumberland was officially incorporated as a town in 1951. Since 1970, the Marion County portion of Cumberland has been subject to Unigov as an included town, but will become an excluded town on January 1, 2027. The Cumberland Historic District is located in the Marion County portion of the town.

== Geography ==
The center of Cumberland is in eastern Marion County, but the town limits extend east and north into western Hancock County, so that the majority of the town's area is now in Hancock County. U.S. Route 40, following the route of the National Road, is the main road through the community, leading west 10 miles (16 km) to downtown Indianapolis and east the same distance to Greenfield, the Hancock county seat.

According to the U.S. Census Bureau, the town has a total area of 2.82 square miles (7.3 km^{2}), of which 0.01 square miles (0.026 km^{2}), or 0.35%, are water. Buck Creek crosses the town, flowing south to join Sugar Creek near London. The town is part of the watershed of the East Branch of the White River.

== Demographics ==
Historical population
| Census | Pop. | Note | %± |
|---|---|---|---|
| 1880 | 299 | | — |
| 1960 | 872 | | — |
| 1970 | 1,478 | | 69.5% |
| 1980 | 3,375 | | 128.3% |
| 1990 | 4,557 | | 35.0% |
| 2000 | 5,500 | | 20.7% |
| 2010 | 5,169 | | −6.0% |
| 2020 | 5,954 | | 15.2% |
U.S. Decennial Census

=== 2020 census ===
As of the 2020 census, Cumberland had a population of 5,954. The median age was 38.1 years. 24.9% of residents were under the age of 18 and 15.8% of residents were 65 years of age or older. For every 100 females there were 97.0 males, and for every 100 females age 18 and over there were 90.6 males age 18 and over.

98.9% of residents lived in urban areas, while 1.1% lived in rural areas.

There were 2,307 households in Cumberland, of which 34.7% had children under the age of 18 living in them. Of all households, 48.7% were married-couple households, 17.6% were households with a male householder and no spouse or partner present, and 25.7% were households with a female householder and no spouse or partner present. About 23.8% of all households were made up of individuals and 8.0% had someone living alone who was 65 years of age or older.

There were 2,534 housing units, of which 9.0% were vacant. The homeowner vacancy rate was 0.6% and the rental vacancy rate was 19.5%.

Racial composition as of the 2020 census
| Race | Number | Percent |
|---|---|---|
| White | 4,002 | 67.2% |
| Black or African American | 1,212 | 20.4% |
| American Indian and Alaska Native | 31 | 0.5% |
| Asian | 75 | 1.3% |
| Native Hawaiian and Other Pacific Islander | 7 | 0.1% |
| Some other race | 193 | 3.2% |
| Two or more races | 434 | 7.3% |
| Hispanic or Latino (of any race) | 400 | 6.7% |

=== 2010 census ===
As of the census of 2010, there were 5,169 people, 1,972 households, and 1,422 families living in the town. The population density was 2,509.2 inhabitants per square mile (968.8/km^{2}). There were 2,233 housing units at an average density of 1,084.0 per square mile (418.5/km^{2}). The racial makeup of the town was 77.0% White, 16.8% African American, 0.6% Native American, 0.9% Asian, 0.1% Pacific Islander, 2.3% from other races, and 2.3% from two or more races. Hispanic or Latino of any race were 5.3% of the population.

There were 1,972 households, of which 36.4% had children under the age of 18 living with them, 50.3% were married couples living together, 16.6% had a female householder with no husband present, 5.2% had a male householder with no wife present, and 27.9% were non-families. 23.1% of all households were made up of individuals, and 6.8% had someone living alone who was 65 years of age or older. The average household size was 2.61 and the average family size was 3.05.

The median age in the town was 38.4 years. 27.4% of residents were under the age of 18; 7.8% were between the ages of 18 and 24; 24% were from 25 to 44; 29.3% were from 45 to 64; and 11.5% were 65 years of age or older. The gender makeup of the town was 48.1% male and 51.9% female.

=== 2000 census ===
As of the census of 2000, there were 5,500 people, 2,030 households, and 1,565 families living in the town. The population density was 2,907.0 inhabitants per square mile (1,122.4/km^{2}). There were 2,190 housing units at an average density of 1,157.5 per square mile (446.9/km^{2}). The racial makeup of the town was 85.20% White, 10.56% African American, 0.22% Native American, 1.76% Asian, 0.04% Pacific Islander, 0.75% from other races, and 1.47% from two or more races. Hispanic or Latino of any race were 1.45% of the population.

There were 2,030 households, out of which 40.6% had children under the age of 18 living with them, 59.3% were married couples living together, 14.6% had a female householder with no husband present, and 22.9% were non-families. 19.1% of all households were made up of individuals, and 5.7% had someone living alone who was 65 years of age or older. The average household size was 2.70 and the average family size was 3.08.

The town's population was spread out, with 30.0% under the age of 18, 7.1% from 18 to 24, 29.9% from 25 to 44, 24.4% from 45 to 64, and 8.6% who were 65 years of age or older. The median age was 34 years. For every 100 females, there were 92.5 males. For every 100 females age 18 and over, there were 88.1 males.

The median income for a household in the town was $57,875, and the median income for a family was $61,739. Males had a median income of $48,750 versus $28,239 for females. The per capita income for the town was $24,746. About 5.0% of families and 6.6% of the population were below the poverty line, including 12.2% of those under age 18 and 1.5% of those age 65 or over.

== Education ==
It is in the Warren Township Metropolitan School District. The zoned elementary school is Grassy Creek Elementary School.

The comprehensive high school is Warren Central High School.

== See also ==
- List of neighborhoods in Indianapolis
