= Hannah–Oehler–Elder House =

Historic house in Indiana, United States

- U.S. National Register of Historic Places
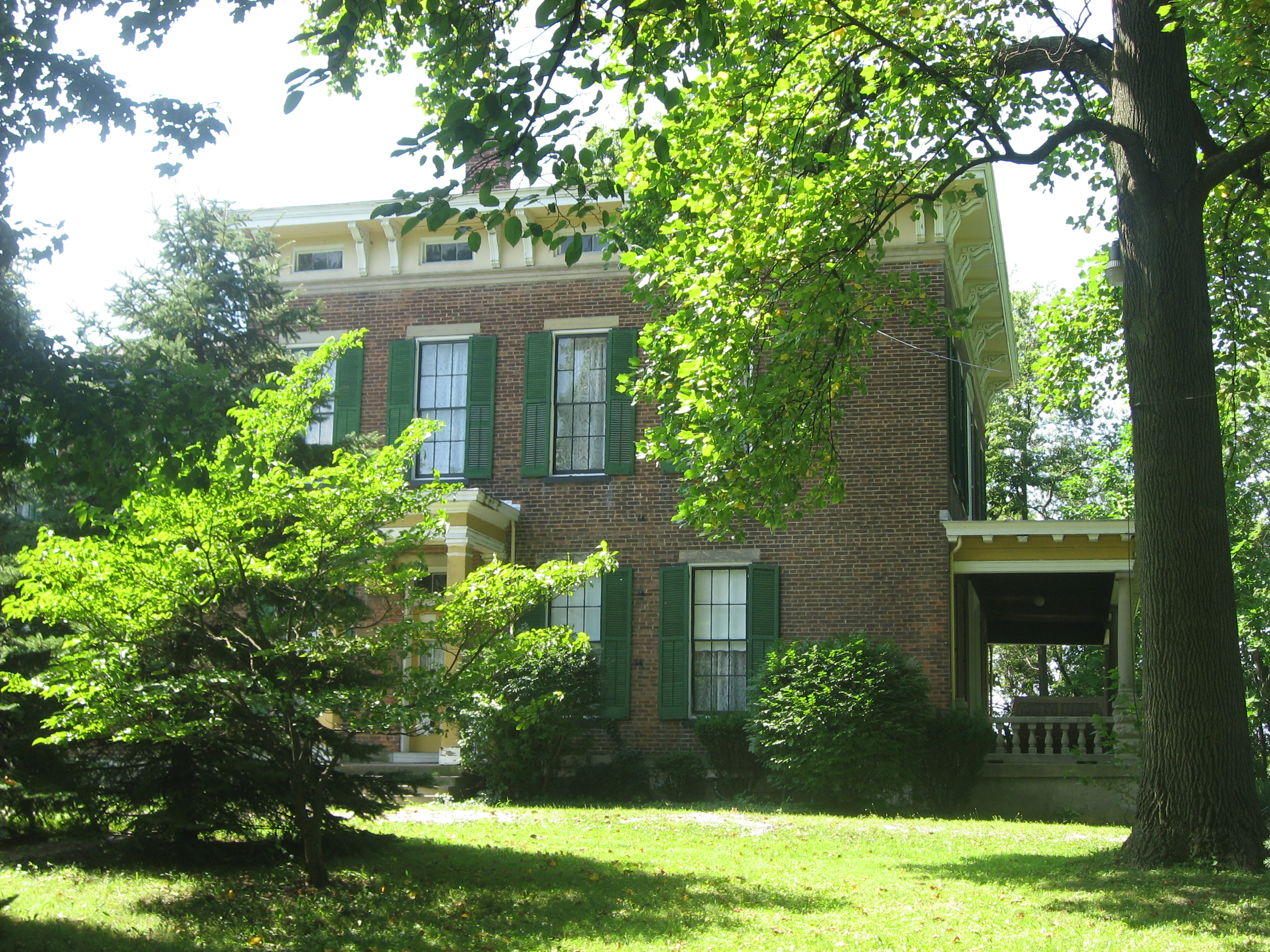
- Hannah-Oehler-Elder House, July 2010

- Location within Indianapolis Location within Indiana Location within the United States
- Location: 3801 Madison Ave., Indianapolis, Indiana
- Coordinates: 39°42′41″N 86°08′36″W
- Area: 3 acres (1.2 ha)
- Built: 1859, 1872
- Architectural style: Italianate, Greek Revival
- NRHP reference No.: 78000046
- Added to NRHP: December 1, 1978

Hannah–Oehler–Elder House, also known as the Hannah House, is a historic home in Indianapolis, Indiana. It was built in 1859 and is a 2 1/2-story, five-bay, Italianate style brick dwelling with Greek Revival style design elements. It has a lower two-story kitchen wing with gallery added in 1872. The house has a low-pitched hipped roof with bracketed eaves.

It was added to the National Register of Historic Places in 1978. (Note: The nomination form was submitted under the name Hannah–Oehler–Elder House, but the name was transcribed into the NRHP data base as Hanna–Ochler–Elder House.) Today, the location is most known for being a haunted house.

== History ==
Alexander M. Hannah bought the materials to construct a house in November 1858, using $585 worth of brick. Hannah had moved from California to his home state of Indiana after making substantial money from the California gold rush. The house was built in 1859 on 240 acres (97 ha) of farmland purchased from his father, Samuel Hannah. He added a smokehouse, milk cooling room, staff quarters, and a wash house to the property following his marriage to Elizabeth Jackson in 1872. Their only child was stillborn on March 16, 1875, leaving no one to inherit the house.

The house went on the market and was purchased alongside 21 acres (8.5 ha) of surrounding property by jeweler and Civil War veteran Roman Oehler in 1899. Oehler was a successful local businessman who emigrated from Württemberg, Germany in 1859, initially selling pins door-to-door until he made enough money to open his first jewelry shop on Virginia Avenue. Oehler added the front porch to the house, as well as a barn to replace the three previous barns Hannah initially built. Roman Oehler died March 28, 1920, leaving the house to his daughter Romena. Romena inhabited the house with her husband and four children until 1962. Her surname from her husband, Marion Elder, was the last to be associated with the property.

The house is still owned by descendants of the Oehler family today. In the 1960s and 70s, John and Gladys O'Brien rented the house and ran an antique store inside. During this period, the first reports of the paranormal activity that the house would become known for arose.

== Urban legends ==
The most popular urban legend surrounding the house revolves around the death of a group of fugitive slaves on the Underground Railroad hiding in the cellar. When an oil lamp was knocked over, the resulting house fire took their lives. According to the myth, Alexander Hannah buried the bodies in the cellar to avoid being caught for harboring escaped slaves, trapping their souls in the basement. The hauntings resulting from this incident have made the Hannah house a popular destination for paranormal investigators and haunted house visitors. The Hannah House's actual existence as a stop on the Underground Railroad is disputed, with Indianapolis historian Jessica Fischer stating, "There is no evidence to say that his house was a part of the Underground Railroad. All we know is he is a Quaker and an abolitionist who would be sympathetic to those enslaved. His property was located away from prying eyes in the city.”

David M. Elder, a descendant of Oehler, called the property "supposedly the only true haunted house in town". He reported alleged paranormal phenomena such as the sound of breaking glass coming from an empty basement, chandeliers swaying without wind, pictures flying off the wall, and other noises and chilling sensations from the property. Multiple reports tell of the smell of rotting flesh emanating from certain rooms. Other myths include sightings of a baby's spirit, believed to be the stillborn baby of the Hannahs.

== Present usage ==
Today, the house is popular as a Halloween destination and event hosting space. The property is used for event rentals for parties and weddings, haunted house tours, overnight paranormal investigations, and murder mystery dinners. The Elder family uses the revenue from events for restoration and property tax payments on the house.

== See also ==
- Indianapolis Historic Preservation Commission
- National Register of Historic Places listings in Marion County, Indiana
