= Pearson Terrace =

Historic house in Indiana, United States

- U.S. National Register of Historic Places
- U.S. Historic district – Contributing property
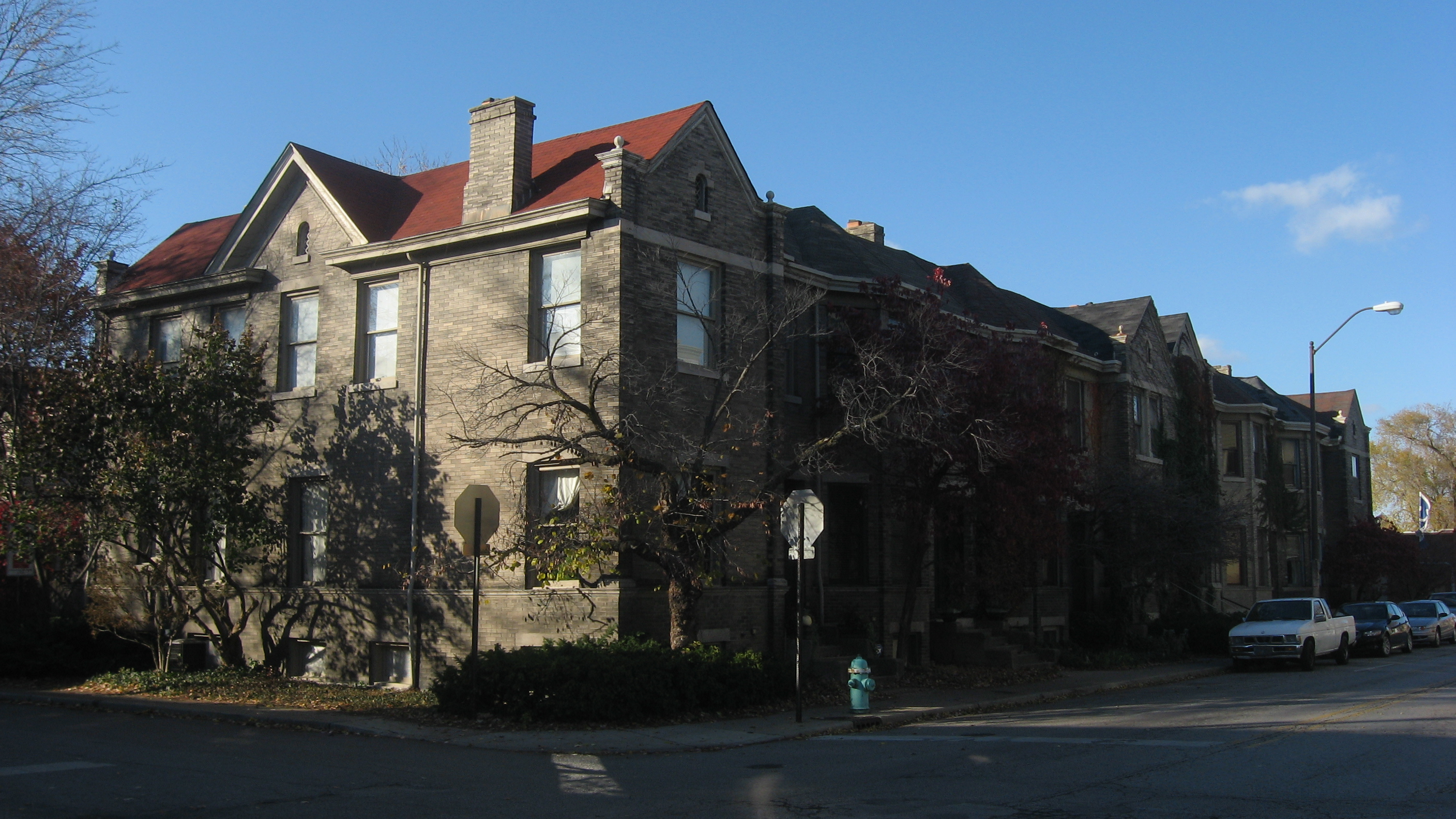
- Pearson Terrace, November 2010

- Location within Indianapolis Location within Indiana Location within the United States
- Location: 928-940 N. Alabama St., Indianapolis, Indiana
- Coordinates: 39°46′49″N 86°9′8″W
- Area: 0.4 acres (0.16 ha)
- Built: 1901-1902
- Architectural style: Queen Anne, Queen Anne Vernacular
- NRHP reference No.: 84001187
- Added to NRHP: March 1, 1984

Pearson Terrace is a historic rowhouse block in Indianapolis, Indiana. It was built in 1901–1902, and is a two-story, seven unit, vernacular Queen Anne style grey brick row with limestone trim. It sits on a raised basement and has a complex gable roof. It features a projecting two bay center unit and projecting window bay.

It was listed on the National Register of Historic Places in 1984. It is in the St. Joseph Neighborhood Historic District.

== See also ==
- National Register of Historic Places listings in Center Township, Marion County, Indiana
