= Pierson–Griffiths House =

Historic house in Indiana, United States

- U.S. National Register of Historic Places
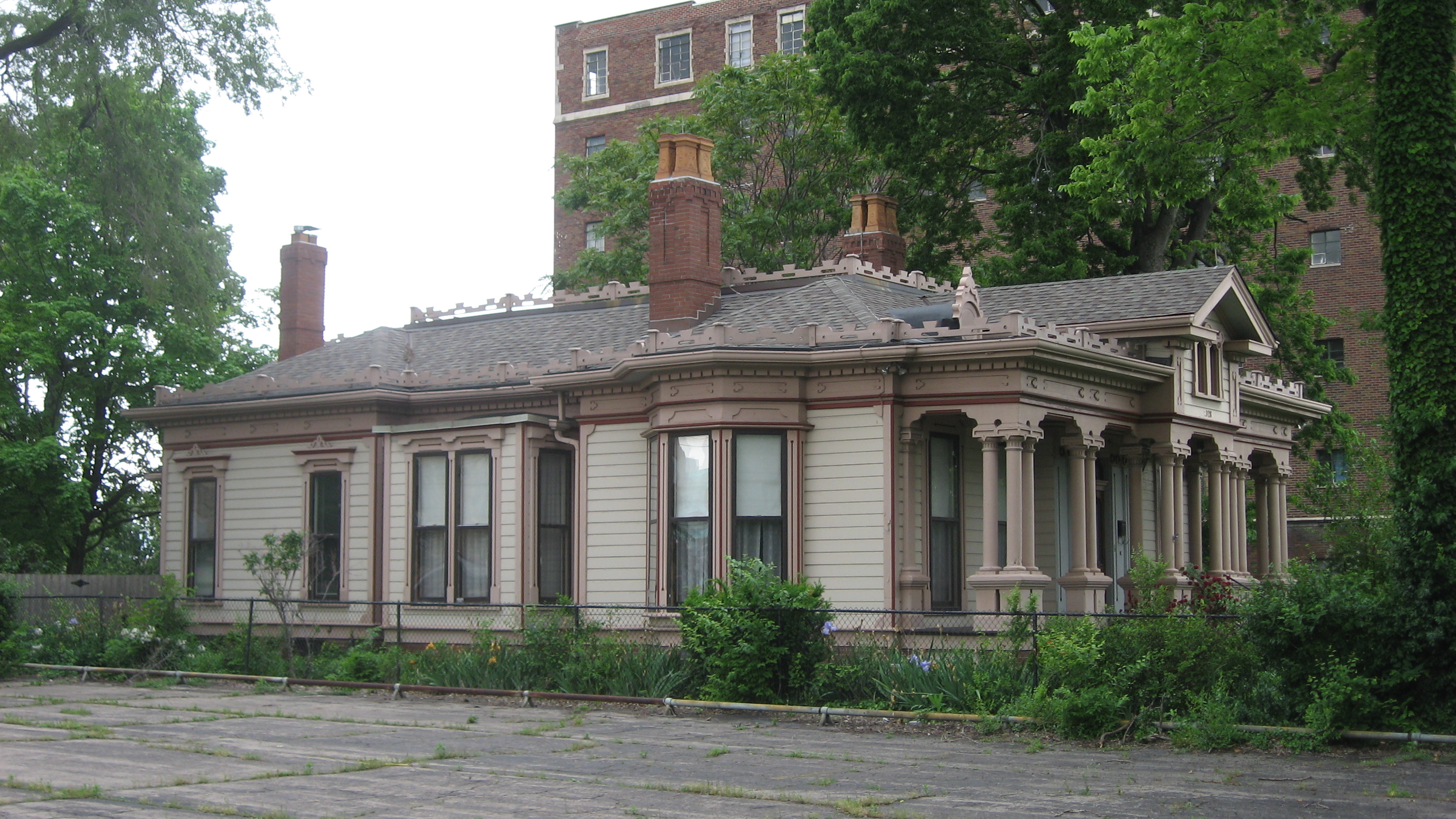
- Pierson–Griffiths House, January 2010

- Location within Indianapolis Location within Indiana Location within the United States
- Location: 1028 N. Delaware St., Indianapolis, Indiana
- Coordinates: 39°46′56″N 86°9′15″W
- Area: less than one acre
- Built: 1873
- Architectural style: Mixed (more Than 2 Styles From Different Periods)
- NRHP reference No.: 78000050
- Added to NRHP: May 22, 1978

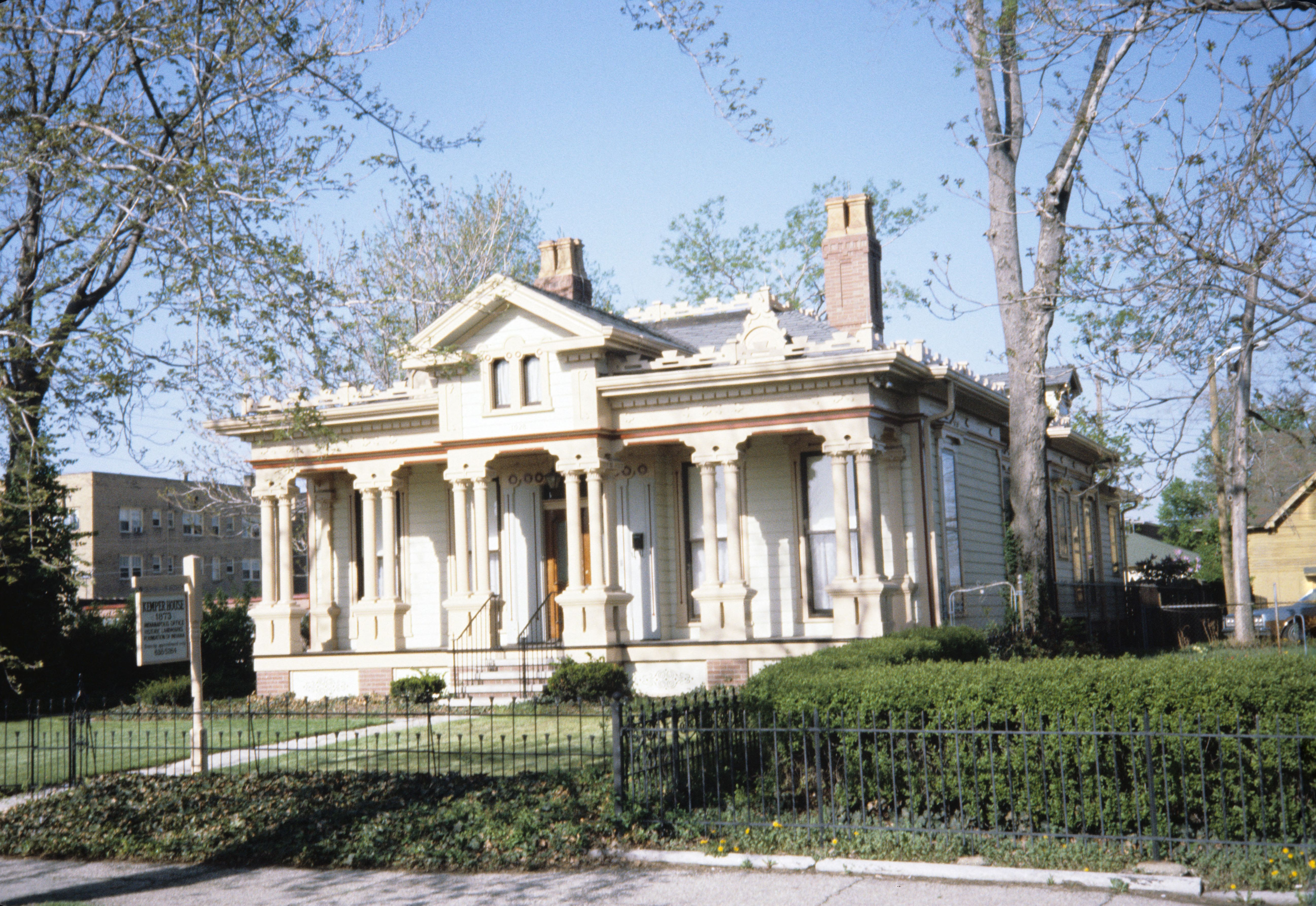

Pierson–Griffiths House, also known as the Kemper House, is a historic home located at Indianapolis, Indiana. It was built in 1873, and is a 1 1/2-story, rectangular, five bay frame dwelling on a low brick foundation. It has elements of Greek Revival and Second Empire style architecture. It features a full-width front porch with grouped columns and a low hipped roof with decorative cut wood cresting around the perimeter.

It was listed on the National Register of Historic Places in 1978.

== See also ==
- Indianapolis Historic Preservation Commission
- National Register of Historic Places listings in Center Township, Marion County, Indiana
