= Cumberland Historic District =

Historic district in Indiana, United States

- U.S. National Register of Historic Places
- U.S. Historic district
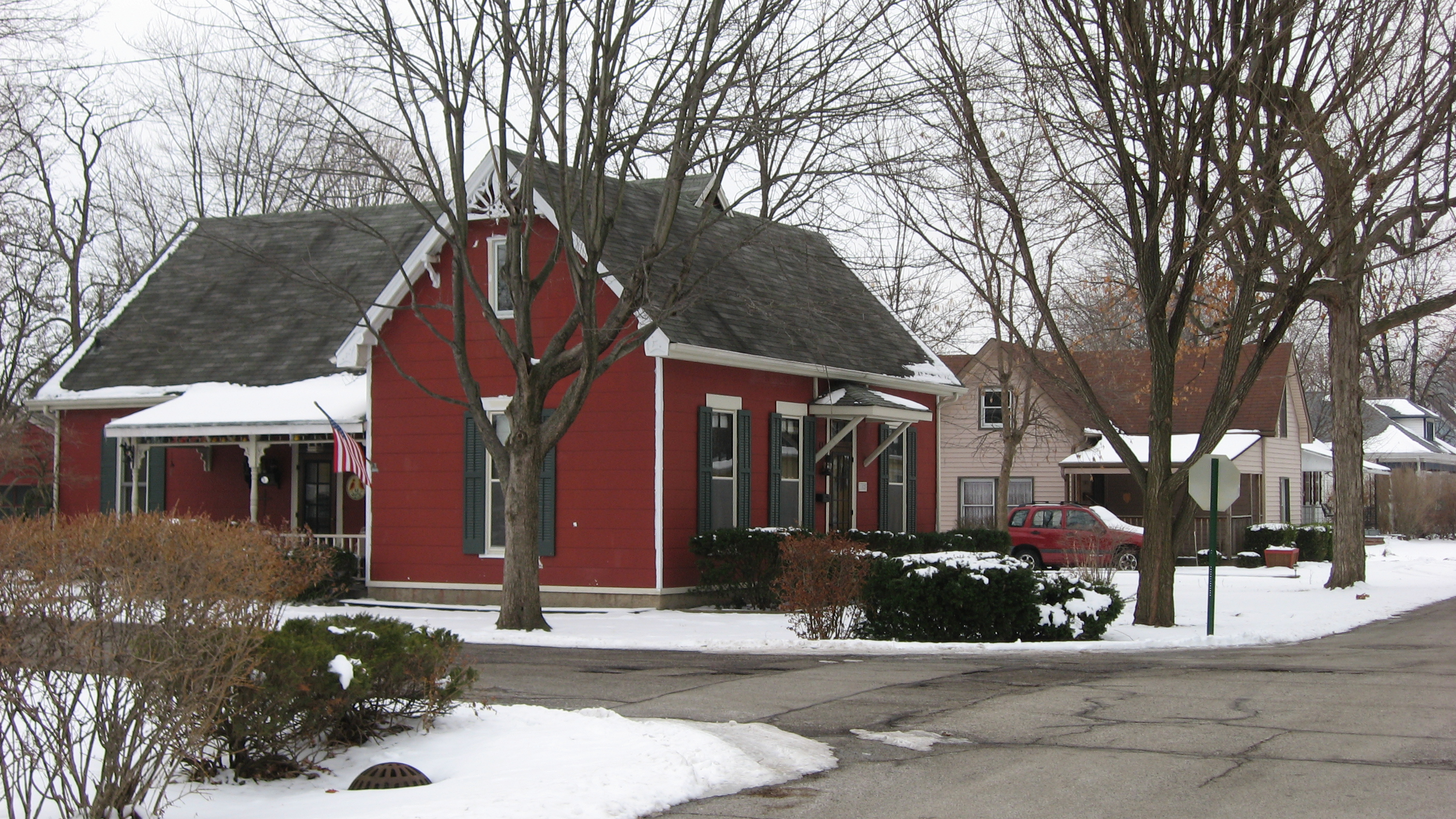
- Colmar and Wayburn in Cumberland, January 2011

- Location within Indianapolis Location within Indiana Location within the United States
- Location: Roughly bounded by Munsie, Welland, Heflin, and Warehouse Sts., Cumberland, Indiana
- Coordinates: 39°46′36″N 85°57′23″W
- Area: 46.6 acres (18.9 ha)
- Built: c 1900
- Architectural style: Bungalow/craftsman
- NRHP reference No.: 01001341
- Added to NRHP: December 7, 2001

Cumberland Historic District is a national historic district located at Cumberland, Indiana. It encompasses 91 contributing buildings in the Cumberland section of Indianapolis. The district developed between about 1831 and 1950, and includes representative examples of Folk Victorian and Bungalow / American Craftsman style architecture. Notable contributing resources include the Cumberland Bank (1907), Masonic Lodge (c. 1910), Miller's Lunch, and First Baptist Church (1912–1913).

It was listed on the National Register of Historic Places in 2001.

== See also ==
- National Register of Historic Places listings in Marion County, Indiana
