= St. Joseph Neighborhood Historic District =

Historic district in Indianapolis, Indiana, US

- U.S. National Register of Historic Places
- U.S. Historic district
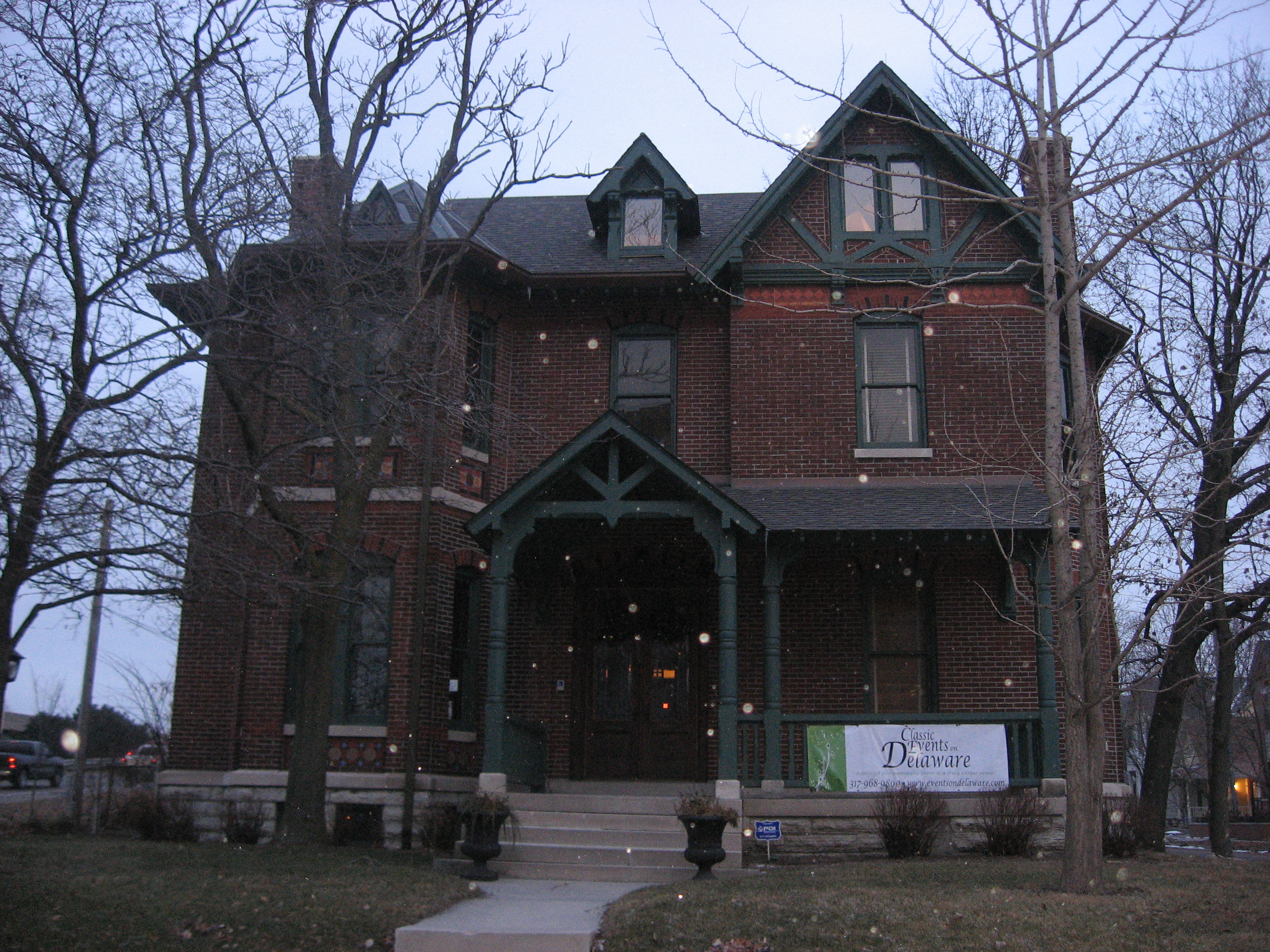
- 1101 North Delaware, January 2010

- Location within Indianapolis Location within Indiana Location within the United States
- Location: Roughly bounded by St. Clair, Delaware and Eleventh Sts. and Central and Ft. Wayne Aves., Indianapolis, Indiana
- Coordinates: 39°46′50″N 86°09′08″W
- Area: 18 acres (7.3 ha)
- Architectural style: Queen Anne, Italianate, Commercial Style
- NRHP reference No.: 91000794
- Added to NRHP: June 27, 1991

St. Joseph Neighborhood Historic District is a national historic district located at Indianapolis, Indiana. The district encompasses 57 contributing buildings in a predominantly residential section of Indianapolis. It was developed between about 1855 and 1930, and include representative examples of Italianate and Queen Anne style architecture. Located in the district are the separately listed Bals-Wocher House, William Buschmann Block, Delaware Court, Pearson Terrace, and The Spink. Other notable buildings include the Christian Place complex, Fishback-Vonnegut-New House, Henry Hilker House, Apollo-Aurora Rowhouses, Israel Traub Store (c. 1865), and Lorenzo Moody House.

It was listed on the National Register of Historic Places in 1991.

== See also ==
- List of gay villages
- List of neighborhoods in Indianapolis
- National Register of Historic Places listings in Center Township, Marion County, Indiana
