= Bals–Wocher House =

Historic house in Indiana, United States

- U.S. National Register of Historic Places
- U.S. Historic district – Contributing property
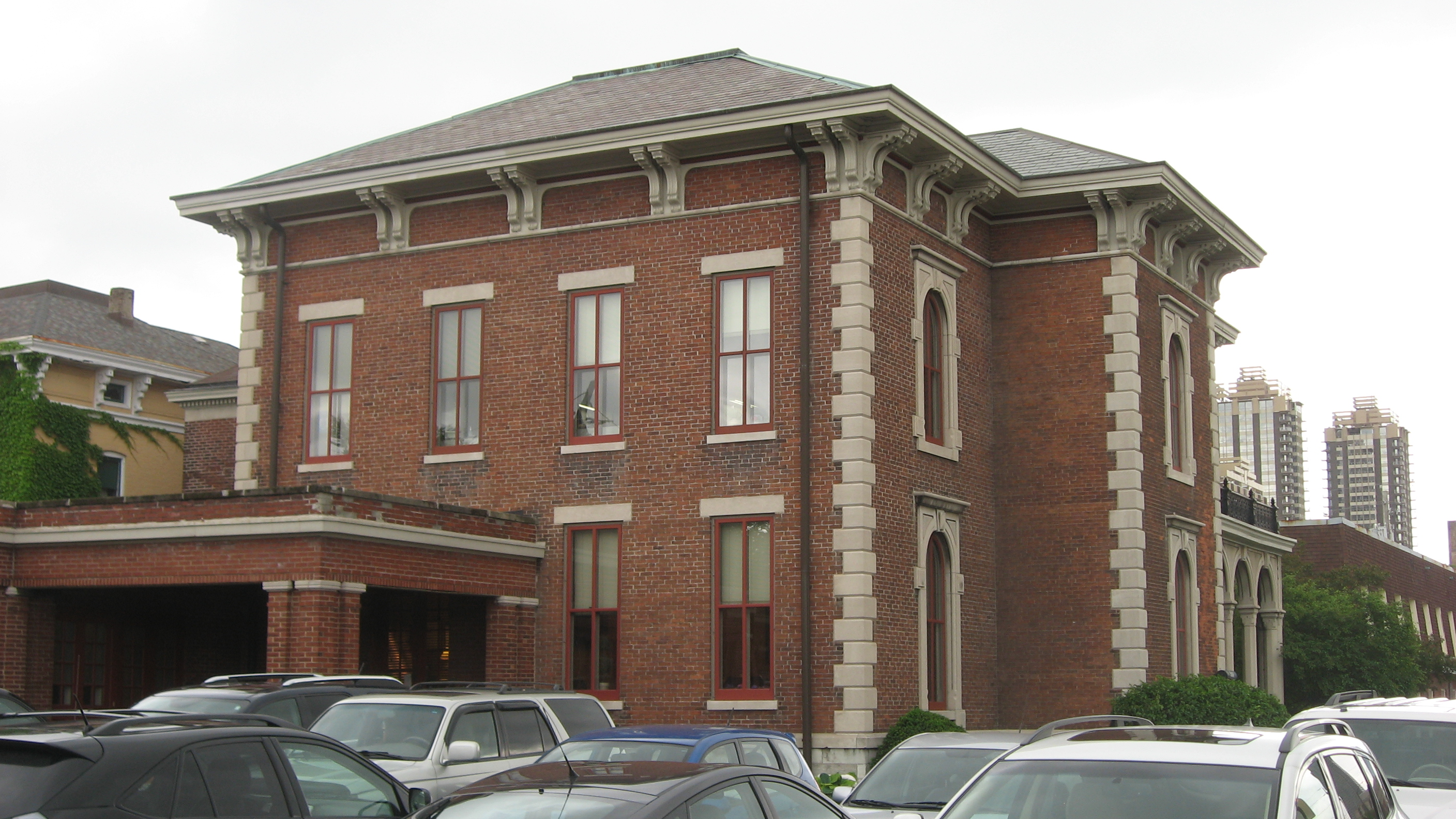
- Bals–Wocher House, January 2010

- Location within Indianapolis Location within Indiana Location within the United States
- Location: 951 N. Delaware St., Indianapolis, Indiana
- Coordinates: 39°46′16″N 86°9′13″W
- Area: less than one acre
- Built: 1869-1870
- Built by: Bals, Charles H. g.
- Architectural style: Italianate
- NRHP reference No.: 79000033
- Added to NRHP: December 17, 1979

Bals–Wocher House is a historic home located in Indianapolis, Indiana. It was built in 1869–1870, and is a three-story, Italianate style brick dwelling with heavy limestone trim. It has a low hipped roof with deck and paired brackets on the overhanging eaves. It features stone quoins and an off-center arcaded loggia.

It was listed on the National Register of Historic Places in 1979. It is located in the St. Joseph Neighborhood Historic District.

== See also ==
- National Register of Historic Places listings in Center Township, Marion County, Indiana
