= Chatham–Arch, Indianapolis =

- Chatham–Arch Historic District
- U.S. National Register of Historic Places
- U.S. Historic district
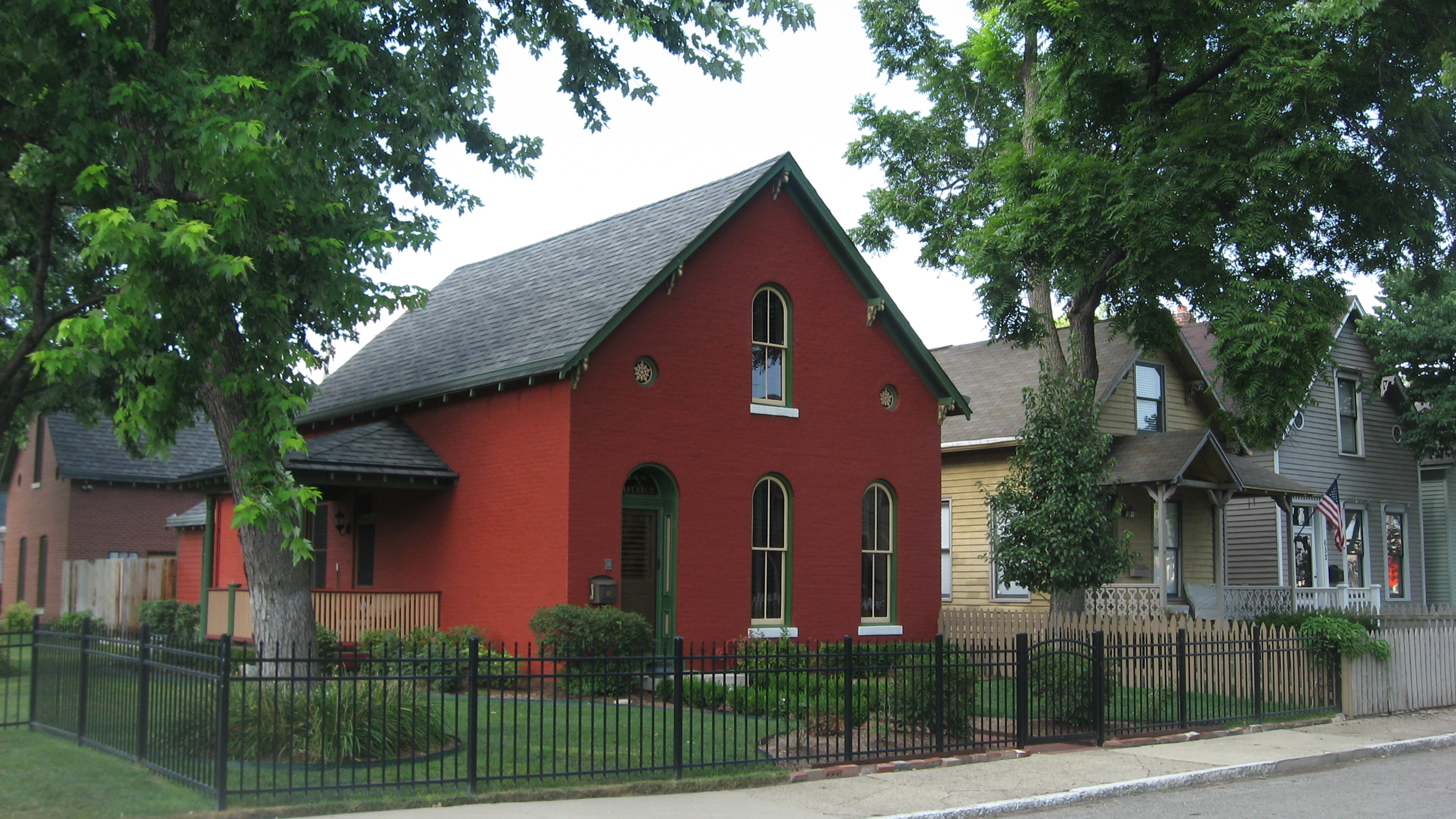
- Houses on the north side of the 600 block of E. Arch St

- Location within Indianapolis Location within Indianapolis Location within Indiana Location within the United States
- Location: Roughly bounded by I-65, College Ave., 10th, 11th, North, New Jersey, Cleveland and East Sts., Indianapolis, Indiana
- Coordinates: 39°46′42″N 86°8′48″W
- Area: 54.5 acres (22.1 ha)
- Built: 1836
- Architectural style: Italianate, Queen Anne, Gothic Revival
- NRHP reference No.: 80000057
- Added to NRHP: March 13, 1980

Chatham–Arch is a neighborhood located immediately east of Downtown Indianapolis, Indiana, United States. This neighborhood is one of the oldest in Indianapolis, dating back to the mid-19th century. Chatham–Arch contains many of Indianapolis's historic homes.

The Chatham–Arch Historic District is a 54.5-acre (22.1 ha) national historic district in the neighborhood that was listed on the National Register of Historic Places in 1980. In 1980 it included 112 contributing buildings that were deemed to contribute to the historic character of the area. It developed between about 1836 and 1930, and includes representative examples of Italianate, Gothic Revival, and Queen Anne style architecture. Notable buildings include the Allen Methodist Episcopal Church (1927), Christian Hornberger House (1886), Mary Jefferson House (1875–1880), Rev. William Armstrong House (1881), Joseph Wernsing House (1868), Sarah Dye House (1890), Thomas Fiscus House (1865–1866), The Richelieu (1905), August Buschmann Building (1894), St. Joseph's Catholic Church (1879), Park Avenue Church (1909), First United Brethren Church (1922), Chatham Place (1878), The Argyle (1911), Wallace Block (1880), and Knauf-Smith Block (1886).

== See also ==
- List of neighborhoods in Indianapolis
- National Register of Historic Places listings in Center Township, Marion County, Indiana
