= List of parks in Indianapolis =

This is a list of parks in Indianapolis. Indianapolis is home to more than 200 public parks overseen by multiple jurisdictions. Parkland managed by the City of Indianapolis Department of Parks and Recreation (Indy Parks) collectively cover 11,258 acres (4,556 ha). In 2022, the system included 129 playgrounds, 155 sports fields, 153 miles (246 km) of recreational trails, 23 recreation and nature centers, 21 spraygrounds, 19 aquatic centers, 13 golf courses, and four dog parks.

== List ==
To avoid undue exhaustiveness, this list limits entries to municipal and state managed parks within the consolidated City of Indianapolis. It therefore excludes the following categories:

- Privately administered parks, including those that may be open to public use but are overseen by community development corporations, homeowners associations, or other nongovernmental entities. Notable exceptions (like privately owned public spaces with separate Wikipedia articles) are explicitly identified with a "†" symbol.
- Municipal parks located within Marion County's excluded cities and towns, such as Beech Grove, Cumberland, Lawrence, Speedway, and other independently governed municipalities.
- Neighborhood pocket parks developed through the Keep Indianapolis Beautiful/AES Indiana Project GreenSpace program, which comprise approximately 82 sites across Marion County. These small-scale green spaces, while publicly accessible, are excluded due to their limited size, decentralized administration, and a planning and maintenance framework distinct from the city's.

State owned and/or managed
Name	Image	Est.	Size ac (ha)	Location	Notes
Acton Park		2004	23 acres (9.3 ha)	39.6620°N 85.9723°W	The site in the Acton neighborhood was originally the location of a Methodist summer retreat from 1859 until it was destroyed by a fire in 1905. It remained in private hands until the city of Indianapolis purchased it in 2004 for a public park.
Alfred "Al" E. Polin Park		1973	2 acres (0.81 ha)	39.8075°N 86.1546°W	
Alice Carter Place		1922	1 acre (0.40 ha)	39.8574°N 86.1576°W	
Andrew Ramsey Park		1971	2 acres (0.81 ha)	39.8325°N 86.1649°W	Features include a comfort station, picnic tables, a playground, a splash pad, and a shelter.
Arsenal Park		1928	12 acres (4.9 ha)	39.8415°N 86.1362°W	Features include basketball courts, a comfort station, a community garden, open space, a playground, a shelter, a skatepark, and a splash pad.
ArtsPark†		2005	10 acres (4.0 ha)	39.8781°N 86.1443°W	The sculpture park is situated along the south bank of the White River and immediately west of the Monon Trail. Home to 27 pieces of artwork, it is owned and maintained by the Indy Art Center. Admission to the park is free. It was designed by postmodern architect Michael Graves.
Babe Denny Park		1923	1 acre (0.40 ha)	39.7552°N 86.1643°W	Features include a basketball court, benches, picnic tables, a playground, and a shelter. Originally named Meikel Street Park, it was renamed to honor civic leader Edward "Babe" Denny in 1989.
Ball Nurses' Sunken Garden and Convalescent Park†		1934	5.5 acres (2.2 ha) (Note: Size is estimated based on the verbal boundary description noted in Section 10, Page 11 of the National Register of Historic Places Inventory Form.)	39.7767°N 86.1821°W	Designed by the Olmsted Brothers firm as a therapeutic garden, it is a listed national historic site, featuring benches, a pergola, and a fountain home to the sculpture Eve. The park was rededicated in 2016 following restoration. It is owned and maintained by Indiana University.
Barton Park		1946	6 acres (2.4 ha)	39.8002°N 86.1625°W	
Basswood Park		2003	7 acres (2.8 ha)	39.6833°N 86.0582°W	
Beckwith Memorial Park		1970	5 acres (2.0 ha)	39.8121°N 86.1230°W	Features include basketball courts, benches, a football field, a playground, and a shelter. Originally named Salem Village Park, it was renamed to honor Frank R. Beckwith, the first African American in Indiana to run as a major party candidate in a presidential primary.
Bel-Aire Park		2002	15 acres (6.1 ha)	39.7232°N 86.2164°W	
Bellamy Park		1962	7 acres (2.8 ha)	39.8236°N 85.9996°W	
Bertha Ross Park		1925	15 acres (6.1 ha)	39.8203°N 86.1812°W	
Beville Park		1959	0.25 acres (0.10 ha)	39.773°N 86.1233°W	
Blickman Educational Trail Park		2005	4 acres (1.6 ha)	39.873782°N 86.154224°W	
Bluff Park		1946	10 acres (4.0 ha)	39.7068°N 86.1692°W	
Bowman Park		1959	5 acres (2.0 ha)	39.8206°N 86.2449°W	
Brightwood Park		1918	1 acre (0.40 ha)	39.8009°N 86.1074°W	
Broad Ripple Park		1946	56 acres (23 ha)	39.8712°N 86.1309°W	Features include athletic fields, a baseball diamond, a boat ramp, a dog park, a family center, an outdoor swimming pool, picnic tables, a playground, shelters, tennis courts, trails, and woods. It is situated along the White River. The park was the original site of White City Amuseument Park and the Broad Ripple Park Carousel (now housed at The Children's Museum of Indianapolis). It is part of the Indy Birding Trail.
Brookside Park		1898	100 acres (40 ha)	39.7905°N 86.1096°W	Features include ball diamonds, basketball courts, a disc golf course, a family center, a football field, open space, an outdoor swimming pool, paved trails, picnic tables, playgrounds, shelters, and tennis courts. The park is included in the Indianapolis Park and Boulevard System. It is part of the Indy Birding Trail.
Brown's Corner Park			3 acres (1.2 ha)	39.7705°N 86.0842°W	
Canterbury Park		1959	2 acres (0.81 ha)	39.8541°N 86.1403°W	
Carroll & 42nd Park		2014	20 acres (8.1 ha)	39.8319°N 85.9543°W	
Carson Park		1964	25 acres (10 ha)	39.6854°N 86.2664°W	
Centennial & 20th Park		1946	0.4 acres (0.16 ha)	39.7932°N 86.2133°W	
Centennial & Groff Park		1926	4 acres (1.6 ha)	39.7990°N 86.2135°W	
Central Greens Sports Field		2015	8 acres (3.2 ha)	39.7674°N 86.2145°W	A track and field facility on a portion of the former Central State Hospital campus.
Century Park		2010	28 acres (11 ha)	39.7235°N 86.0244°W	
Chapel Hill Park		1946	5 acres (2.0 ha)	39.7764°N 86.2886°W	
Charles L. Whistler Memorial Plaza		1977	0.5 acres (0.20 ha)	39.7687°N 86.1539°W	Features include the Sun King Market District Stage, benches, planters, moveable tables and chairs, and an original archway from Tomlinson Hall. The plaza is located on the west side of Indianapolis City Market and was named to honor civic leader Charles L. Whistler in 1987. The plaza is maintained by the Indianapolis–Marion County Building Authority.
Christian Park		1921	73 acres (30 ha)	39.7610°N 86.0959°W	The park is included in the Indianapolis Park and Boulevard System.
Christina Oaks Park		1971	2 acres (0.81 ha)	39.7573°N 86.2350°W	
Chuck Klein Sports Complex		1983	22 acres (8.9 ha)	39.7663°N 86.2402°W	
Clayton & LaSalle Park		1972	4 acres (1.6 ha)	39.7615°N 86.1087°W	
Cloverleaf Conservation Area		1999	19 acres (7.7 ha)	39.7635°N 86.3090°W	
Colorado & 29th Park		2006	5 acres (2.0 ha)	39.8077°N 86.0948°W	
Colts Canal Playspace		2018	1 acre (0.40 ha)	39.7773°N 86.1644°W	Located adjacent to the Canal Walk and Indianapolis Cultural Trail, features include an accessible playground, benches, and shade structures. It is the first public playground in downtown Indianapolis.
Commons Park		2018	0.25 acres (0.10 ha)	39.7715°N 86.1239°W	Features include benches, a grill, a ping-pong table, and a playground.
Copper Grove Park		2007	11 acres (4.5 ha)	39.7014°N 86.0504°W	
Dan Wakefield Park		1928	3 acres (1.2 ha)	39.8649°N 86.1476°W	Features include a beach volleyball court, a playground, a shelter, a splash pad, and tennis courts. Originally named Broadway & 61st Park, it was renamed to honor author and journalist Dan Wakefield in 2016.
Daubenspeck Community Nature Park†		2006	22 acres (8.9 ha)	39.9169°N 86.1841°W	Features include benches, boardwalks, tallgrass prairie, trails, wetlands, and woods. The park is maintained by a nonprofit volunteer board of directors under a 30-year land lease with the Metropolitan School District of Washington Township. It is part of the Indy Birding Trail.
Denver Park		1925	2 acres (0.81 ha)	39.7813°N 86.2090°W	
DeQuincy Park		1953	1 acre (0.40 ha)	39.7937°N 86.0883°W	
Dollar Hide Creek Park		2006	17 acres (6.9 ha)	39.6766°N 86.2520°W	
Doris Cowherd Park		1956	3 acres (1.2 ha)	39.8307°N 86.0773°W	
Dr. Martin Luther King Jr. Park		1961	14 acres (5.7 ha)	39.7931°N 86.1465°W	Features include benches, the Landmark for Peace Memorial sculpture, a swimming pool, picnic tables, a playground, a shelter, and open space.
Dubarry Park		1967	27 acres (11 ha)	39.8211°N 86.0162°W	
Eagle Creek Park		1972	5,300 acres (2,100 ha)	39.868642°N 86.305676°W	The largest park in Indianapolis and among the largest municipal parks in the U.S. Features include a 1,400-acre (570 ha) reservoir, an amphitheater, a bait shop, a beach, a bird sanctuary, a dog park, the Mary and John Geisse Soccer Complex, a golf course, a marina, a nature center, three nature preserves, an ornithology center, a playground, two retreat centers, a rowing course, sailing club, shelters, sledding hills, trails, and a zip line course. Canoes, kayaks, paddle boats, stand-up paddle boards, pontoon boats, sailboats, and mountain bikes are rentable. Birdwatching, canoeing, cross-country skiing, cycling, fishing, golfing, hiking, kayaking, picnicking, rowing, sailing, sledding, and swimming are popular recreational activities at the park. Eagle Creek is the only municipal park that requires an entrance fee. It is part of the Indy Birding Trail.
Eagle Highlands Park		1989	18 acres (7.3 ha)	39.8314°N 86.2827°W	
Edna Balz Lacy Family Park		1917	2 acres (0.81 ha)	39.7568°N 86.1484°W	Features include a beach volleyball court, a bocce ball court, picnic tables, a playground, a shelter, and a shuffleboard court. Originally named Greer Park, it was renamed to honor philanthropist Edna Balz Lacy in 1995.
Ellenberger Park		1911	37 acres (15 ha)	39.7766°N 86.0765°W	Features include athletic fields, ball diamonds, open space, an outdoor swimming pool, playgrounds, a shelter, a sledding hill, tennis courts, trails, and a volleyball court. It also serves as the northern terminus of the Pleasant Run Greenway. The park is included in the Indianapolis Park and Boulevard System. It is part of the Indy Birding Trail.
Elwood & Mary Black Park		1946	2 acres (0.81 ha)	39.8329°N 86.1737°W	
Emhardt Park		1923	2 acres (0.81 ha)	39.7300°N 86.1639°W	
Eva C. Talley Park		2000	2 acres (0.81 ha)	39.8257°N 86.0684°W	
Faculty Park		1961	6 acres (2.4 ha)	39.8152°N 86.2659°W	
Fall Creek & 30th Park		1910	11 acres (4.5 ha)	39.8088°N 86.1436°W	
Fall Creek Pkwy. Preserve		1974	12 acres (4.9 ha)	39.8574°N 86.0816°W	
Fall Creek Trail at Geist Dam		2006	64 acres (26 ha)	39.9103°N 85.9896°W	Features a trail and woods south of Geist Reservoir. It is part of the Indy Birding Trail.
Finch Park		1988	1 acre (0.40 ha)	39.7557°N 86.1303°W	
Five Points & Edgewood Park		2011	35 acres (14 ha)	39.6839°N 86.0459°W	
Forest Manor Park		1937	18 acres (7.3 ha)	39.7936°N 86.0982°W	
Fort Harrison State Park		1996	1,744 acres (706 ha)	39.871441°N 86.019816°W	Formerly the U.S. Army post of Fort Benjamin Harrison, the park's facilities include a golf course and pro shop, an inn and conference center, a visitors center, a museum, a playground, a sledding hill, a dog park, equestrian trails, hiking trails, shelters, and the Fall Creek Greenway. Recreational activities include birding, cross-country skiing, cycling, fishing and ice fishing, horseback riding, hiking, picnicking, and sledding. The park contains four nature preserves, two national historic districts, and access to Fall Creek. It is managed by the Indiana Department of Natural Resources. It is part of the Indy Birding Trail.
Fox Hill Manor Park		1964	9 acres (3.6 ha)	39.8617°N 86.1913°W	
Frank Young Park		1922	0.7 acres (0.28 ha)	39.8071°N 86.1786°W	
Frank & Judy O'Bannon Park		2003	11 acres (4.5 ha)	39.7870°N 86.1412°W	
Franklin & 38th Park		2004	12 acres (4.9 ha)	39.8261°N 86.0241°W	Undeveloped woodland.
Franklin Township Community Park		1970	99 acres (40 ha)	39.6795°N 86.0091°W	Features include ball diamonds, basketball courts, benches, open space, picnic tables, a playground, a shelter, soccer fields, trails, and woods. It is part of the Indy Birding Trail.
Frederick Douglass Park		1921	80 acres (32 ha)	39.8049°N 86.1338°W	Features include ball diamonds, a basketball court, a family center, a football field, a golf course, a paved fitness trail, picnic tables, a playground, an outdoor swimming pool, and tennis courts. Originally named Douglass Park, it was renamed to honor abolitionist Frederick Douglass in 2017.
Friedman Park		1982	18 acres (7.3 ha)	39.8617°N 86.1603°W	
Garfield Park		1873	123 acres (50 ha)	39.733528°N 86.14573°W	The oldest municipal park in Indianapolis, the park features the Burrello Family Center, MacAllister Center for the Performing Arts, an aquatic center, ball diamonds, a basketball court, a community arts center, a conservatory and sunken gardens, football/soccer fields, a public library branch, playgrounds, shelters, sledding hill, statuary, tennis courts, and trails, notably Pleasant Run Greenway. Originally named Southern Park, it was renamed to honor President James A. Garfield in 1881. The park is included in the Indianapolis Park and Boulevard System. It is part of the Indy Birding Trail.
Gardner Park		1962	13 acres (5.3 ha)	39.8395°N 86.0490°W	
Gateway West Park		1963	5 acres (2.0 ha)	39.8295°N 86.2668°W	
George E. Kessler Park		2002	1 acre (0.40 ha)	39.8033°N 86.1559°W	
Glenns Valley Nature Park		1991	27 acres (11 ha)	39.6459°N 86.1937°W	Features include a nature center, open space, picnic tables, trails, and woods. A playground is shared with neighboring Glenns Valley Elementary School. It is part of the Indy Birding Trail.
Grassy Creek Regional Park		1971	242 acres (98 ha)	39.8136°N 85.9792°W	Established as German Church & 30th Park, it originally covered 41 acres (17 ha). A series of acquisitions since 2000 have brought the park to its current acreage. Features include a basketball court, a playground, a shelter, soccer fields, softball diamonds, a splash pad, tennis courts, and trails. Much of the acreage is undeveloped open space with some woods and wetlands. It is part of the Indy Birding Trail.
Grassy Creek Wood Conservation Area			21 acres (8.5 ha)	39.7548°N 85.9799°W	
Gray Park		1999	8 acres (3.2 ha)	39.6646°N 86.1014°W	Features unpaved trails in a wooded riparian zone along Buck Creek. It is part of the Indy Birding Trail.
Griffin Woods		1965	10 acres (4.0 ha)	39.6560°N 86.2847°W	
Gustafson Park		1961	32 acres (13 ha)	39.8104°N 86.2584°W	Features include basketball courts, benches, football fields, an outdoor swimming pool, picnic tables, playgrounds, a shelter, tennis courts, and the Randy Shambaugh Baseball Park. Originally named Northwest Park, it was renamed to honor civic leader Howard Gustafson in 1967.
Hanover North Park		2006	14 acres (5.7 ha)	39.7296°N 86.0287°W	
Haughville Park		1922	6 acres (2.4 ha)	39.7762°N 86.2026°W	
Hawthorne Park		1923	4 acres (1.6 ha)	39.7665°N 86.2023°W	
"The Heart" of Cummins Green†		2017	4 acres (1.6 ha)	39.7672°N 86.1525°W	Privately owned public space managed by Cummins. The Indianapolis Cultural Trail is routed along the western perimeter of the park (along Alabama Street).
Hendricks Park		2002	3 acres (1.2 ha)	39.7503°N 86.1539°W	
Highland Park		1898	4 acres (1.6 ha)	39.7709°N 86.1380°W	The park is included in the Indianapolis Park and Boulevard System.
Highway Parcel #15 Park		1980	1 acre (0.40 ha)	39.8114°N 86.1782°W	
Holliday Park		1916	95 acres (38 ha)	39.8713°N 86.1616°W	Situated along the White River, the park features an arboretum, a nature center, open space, picnic tables, a playground, a rock garden, wooded ravines, and 3.5 miles (5.6 km) of trails. The park is home to three atlantes designed by Karl Bitter from the façade of the demolished St. Paul Building. Referred to as "The Ruins," the pieces and accompanying grotto were dedicated in 1973. A performance space was added as part of a restoration completed in 2016. It is part of the Indy Birding Trail.
Hot Shot Tot Lot		1973	0.14 acres (0.057 ha)	39.7560°N 86.1413°W	Features include benches, a playground, and a picnic table.
Hudnut Commons		1988	2 acres (0.81 ha)	39.7662°N 86.1624°W	Built atop an underground parking garage, features include benches, decorative brick walkways, fountains, an Indiana Pacers Bikeshare station, pergolas, gardens, and a lawn. Originally named Capitol Commons, the plaza was dedicated in 2014 to honor William "Bill" Hudnut, former mayor (1976–1992). It is owned and maintained by the Capital Improvement Board, a municipal corporation that also owns the neighboring Indiana Convention Center.
The Idle†		2018	1 acre (0.40 ha)	39.7556°N 86.1440°W	Features a gravel path that terminates at a vista overlooking the I-65/I-70 "South Split" interchange. The park contains benches, a shade canopy, and repurposed seats from the former Bush Stadium. It is accessible from the Indianapolis Cultural Trail.
Indianapolis World Sports Park		2014	46 acres (19 ha)	39.7521°N 86.0040°W	Opened in 1990 as Post Road Community Park.
Indianola Park		1896	2 acres (0.81 ha)	39.7671°N 86.1937°W	The park is included in the Indianapolis Park and Boulevard System.
Indy Urban Acres		2011	8 acres (3.2 ha)	39.7970°N 86.0322°W	An urban farm operated by the Parks Alliance of Indianapolis.
Iron Gate Conservation Area		1994	11 acres (4.5 ha)	39.760583°N 85.980966°W	
Irving Circle Park		1904	0.6 acres (0.24 ha)	39.7664°N 86.0703°W	The park is included in the Indianapolis Park and Boulevard System.
J. T. V. Hill Park		1921	10 acres (4.0 ha)	39.7913°N 86.1368°W	
Jackson Bells Run Park		2022	13 acres (5.3 ha)	39.8350°N 85.9857°W	
Jake Greene Park		1971	10 acres (4.0 ha)	39.7903°N 86.0268°W	
James Foster "Bruiser" Gaines Park		1971	10 acres (4.0 ha)	39.7960°N 86.2171°W	
James Irving Holcomb Botanical Gardens†		1950	20 acres (8.1 ha)	39.8442°N 86.1709°W	Features include benches, a carillon, a fountain, a garden house, a pond, walking paths, a waterfall, woods, and a 500-foot (150 m) mall that terminates at the sculpture Persephone. The gardens are owned and maintained by Butler University. The gardens are named for James Irving Holcomb who served 24 years on the university's board of directors. It is part of the Indy Birding Trail.
John Ed Park		1925	4 acres (1.6 ha)	39.7938°N 86.1262°W	
Juan Solomon Park		1971	41 acres (17 ha)	39.8666°N 86.1855°W	
Kelly Park		1922	2 acres (0.81 ha)	39.7504°N 86.1599°W	
Kin Hubbard Memorial Park		1982	0.3 acres (0.12 ha)	39.7722°N 86.0828°W	Features include a bench, open space, and trees on the Pleasant Run Greenway. It is named in honor of cartoonist Kin Hubbard.
Kitley & Troy Park		2007	60 acres (24 ha)	39.7292°N 85.9636°W	
Kitley Woods		1998	7 acres (2.8 ha)	39.7352°N 85.9604°W	
Krannert Park		1972	42 acres (17 ha)	39.7573°N 86.2664°W	
Lappin Way Park		1994	19 acres (7.7 ha)	39.7972°N 85.9779°W	
Lentz Park		1928	3 acres (1.2 ha)	39.7776°N 86.1959°W	
Lieutenant Junior Grade Graham Edward Martin Park		1971	67 acres (27 ha)	39.7870°N 86.1734°W	Originally named Fall Creek & 16th Park, it was renamed to honor Golden Thirteen member Graham E. Martin in 2011.
Little Valley Park		1998	2 acres (0.81 ha)	39.7478°N 86.1788°W	
Mari Evans Park		1985	0.1 acres (0.040 ha)	39.8093°N 86.1470°W	Originally named Broadway & 29th Park, it was renamed to honor poet Mari Evans in 2024.
Marott Woods Nature Preserve		1945	99 acres (40 ha)	39.8881°N 86.1431°W	Features include picnic tables, a shelter, trails, and woods. The preserve is bounded by the White River (south) and Monon Trail (east). It is part of the Indy Birding Trail.
The Matthew R. Gutwein Commonground		2014	1 acre (0.40 ha)	39.7772°N 86.1832°W	Features include a café building, fountains, seating, trellises, and landscaping. Located on the Sidney & Lois Eskenazi Hospital campus, the plaza is owned and maintained by Health & Hospital Corporation of Marion County, a municipal corporation. It is named after Matthew Gutwein, former president and chief executive officer.
McCarty Triangle Park		1897	2 acres (0.81 ha)	39.7565°N 86.1799°W	The park is included in the Indianapolis Park and Boulevard System.
McCord Park		1970	2 acres (0.81 ha)	39.8215°N 86.1472°W	
Military Park		1852	14 acres (5.7 ha)	39.770433°N 86.168567°W	The oldest park in Indianapolis and a listed national historic site. Features include a shelter house, walking paths, and open green space. The park is included in the Indianapolis Park and Boulevard System. The Indianapolis Cultural Trail runs along its western boundary and the Canal Walk forms its southern boundary. It is managed by the White River State Park Development Commission.
Moreland Park		1953	6 acres (2.4 ha)	39.8084°N 86.2138°W	
Morris Bicentennial Plaza		2023	1.5 acres (0.61 ha)	39.7651°N 86.1555°W	Features include benches, bike racks, a covered basketball court/seasonal ice skating rink, moveable tables and chairs, public artworks, and restrooms. The plaza is on the north side of Gainbridge Fieldhouse and often hosts events in coordination with the Indiana Pacers and Fever. Its name honors civic leader Jim Morris and Indianapolis's bicentennial. It is owned and maintained by the Capital Improvement Board, a municipal corporation.
Municipal Gardens		1927	4 acres (1.6 ha)	39.7926°N 86.2021°W	
Nina Mason Pulliam EcoLab†		2002	55 acres (22 ha)	39.8184°N 86.2040°W	James A. Allison commissioned landscape architect Jens Jensen to design the grounds of Allison's estate to complement the site's natural features. The restored property features Jensen's original stonework, outdoor classroom space, a pond, trails, wetlands, and woods. It is owned and maintained by Marian University's Environmental Studies Department. The park is named for philanthropist Nina Mason Pulliam. It is part of the Indy Birding Trail.
North Broad Ripple Park		2013	0.3 acres (0.12 ha)	39.8781°N 86.1318°W	
Northwestway Park		1957	117 acres (47 ha)	39.8633°N 86.2504°W	
Olin Park		1967	8 acres (3.2 ha)	39.7781°N 86.2262°W	
Orange Park		1993	2 acres (0.81 ha)	39.7496°N 86.1281°W	
Oscar Charleston Park		1972	22 acres (8.9 ha)	39.8091°N 86.1155°W	
Pathways to Peace Garden		1995	0.08 acres (0.032 ha)	39.7723°N 86.1631°W	Features include benches, planters, and landscaping. It is among the smallest city parks, occupying 3,600 square feet (330 m^{2}) on a triangular plot.
Patricia Park			1 acre (0.40 ha)	39.8122°N 86.2334°W	
Paul Ruster Park		1970	102 acres (41 ha)	39.7593°N 85.9629°W	Features include a dog park, open space, a playground, a pond, shelters, a sledding hill, trails, and woods. Originally named Prospect & Muessing Park, it was renamed to honor local educator and coach Paul Ruster in 1979. It is part of the Indy Birding Trail.
Perry Park		1961	21 acres (8.5 ha)	39.6506°N 86.1534°W	
Pleasant Run Golf Course		1922	103 acres (42 ha)	39.7778°N 86.0590°W	18-hole golf course and included in the Indianapolis Park and Boulevard System.
Pogue's Run Art & Nature Park		2004	43 acres (17 ha)	39.80046°N 86.089135°W	Designed as part of a flood control project on the Pogue's Run waterway, features include benches, public art, trails, wetlands, and open space. It is part of the Indy Birding Trail.
Porter Playfield		1924	1 acre (0.40 ha)	39.7606°N 86.1247°W	
Presidential Place Park		1991	0.5 acres (0.20 ha)	39.7669°N 86.1524°W	Features a small brick plaza modeled after the Mile Square plan of Indianapolis as well as a memorial elm tree planted by former U.S. president George H. W. Bush in 1990. The tree honors Ryan White.
Pride Park		1968	0.5 acres (0.20 ha)	39.7515°N 86.1089°W	
Ransom Place Park		1997	0.3 acres (0.12 ha)	39.7788°N 86.1714°W	
Ravenswood Overlook Park		2007	2 acres (0.81 ha)	39.8877°N 86.1357°W	
Raymond Park		1971	36 acres (15 ha)	39.7386°N 86.0157°W	Features prairie, trails, wetlands, and woods. In partnership with the Metropolitan School District of Warren Township, baseball fields, basketball courts, a disc golf course, tennis courts, and the Indy Island Aquatic Center are located on the grounds of neighboring Raymond Park Middle School. It is part of the Indy Birding Trail.
Red Maple Park		2007	1 acre (0.40 ha)	39.7365°N 86.1138°W	
Retherford Park		1965	5 acres (2.0 ha)	39.6514°N 85.9720°W	
Rev. Charles R. Williams Park		1965	8 acres (3.2 ha)	39.8159°N 86.1394°W	
Rev. Mozel Sanders Park		1931	29 acres (12 ha)	39.7848°N 86.1943°W	
Rhodius Park		1913	24 acres (9.7 ha)	39.7542°N 86.1942°W	The park is included in the Indianapolis Park and Boulevard System.
Richard G. Lugar Plaza		2018	2 acres (0.81 ha)	39.7674°N 86.1535°W	Features include an interactive fountain, an event lawn, Indiana Pacers Bikeshare station, bike racks, moveable tables and chairs, and access to the Indianapolis Cultural Trail. It is named for Richard Lugar, former mayor (1968–1976) and U.S. Senator (1977–2013). The plaza is located on the south side of the City–County Building on the site of the former Marion County Courthouse and is maintained by the Indianapolis–Marion County Building Authority. It was formally declared to be a park on February 26, 2026.
Ridenour Park		1956	7 acres (2.8 ha)	39.7646°N 86.2230°W	
Ringgold Park		1971	0.2 acres (0.081 ha)	39.7477°N 86.1421°W	
Riverside Regional Park		1898	862 acres (349 ha)	39.804976°N 86.193495°W	The park is included in the Indianapolis Park and Boulevard System.
Riverwood Park		2006	12 acres (4.9 ha)	39.8864°N 86.1269°W	
Robey Park		1972	20 acres (8.1 ha)	39.8052°N 86.3154°W	
Roselawn Park		1968	11 acres (4.5 ha)	39.8287°N 86.0868°W	
Ross Claypool Park		1940	4 acres (1.6 ha)	39.7468°N 86.2003°W	
Sahm Park		1963	155 acres (63 ha)	39.916145°N 86.053247°W	Features include an aquatic center, a basketball court, a disc golf course, a golf course, open space, picnic tables, playgrounds, shelters, soccer fields, tennis/pickleball courts, sand volleyball courts, and woods. Originally named Northeastway Park, it was renamed in honor of William S. Sahm in 1978.
Sandorf Park		1959	6 acres (2.4 ha)	39.7403°N 86.1290°W	
Sarah Shank Golf Course		1927	118 acres (48 ha)	39.7267°N 86.1175°W	18-hole golf course
Sargent Road Nature Preserve†		2024	26 acres (11 ha)	39.8998°N 86.0122°W	The nature preserve features benches and hiking trails. It is owned and managed by the nonprofit land trust Mud Creek Conservancy in Lawrence Township.
Seerley Creek Park		2006	18 acres (7.3 ha)	39.7144°N 86.2474°W	
Sexson Park		1973	0.6 acres (0.24 ha)	39.7420°N 86.1527°W	
Skiles Test Nature Park		1974	81 acres (33 ha)	39.8719°N 86.0499°W	Features include restored prairie, woods, and paved and unpaved trails, including access to the Fall Creek Greenway. It is part of the Indy Birding Trail.
Smock Golf Course and Dog Park		1970	160 acres (65 ha)	39.6394°N 86.0962°W	Features a dog park and 18-hole golf course, including a pro shop, clubhouse, and driving range. Originally known as County Line South Golf Course, it was renamed in honor of Carl E. Smock in 1977.
Southeastway Park		1961	188 acres (76 ha)	39.686664°N 85.958022°W	Features include an activity center, open space, picnic tables, playgrounds, a pond, shelters, short and tallgrass prairie, a sledding hill, paved and unpaved trails, wetlands, and woods. It is part of the Indy Birding Trail.
Southside Park		1966	8 acres (3.2 ha)	39.7077°N 86.1251°W	
South Street Square Park		2019	4 acres (1.6 ha)	39.7606°N 86.1520°W	Features include benches, an event lawn, landscaping, and walking paths. Under a public–private partnership, Eli Lilly and Company developed the property, then donated it to Indy Parks. The company maintains the park.
Southwestway Park		1961	587 acres (238 ha)	39.6533°N 86.2408°W	Located along the White River, the park contains Winding River Golf Course and Mann Hill, featuring ball diamonds, open space, a playground, a shelter, soccer fields, trails, and woods. Popular recreational activities include birdwatching, fishing, hiking, horseback riding, and mountain biking. It is part of the Indy Birding Trail.
Spades Park		1896	31 acres (13 ha)	39.7859°N 86.1279°W	Features include open space, a playground, and a shelter. The park is included in the Indianapolis Park and Boulevard System. It is part of the Indy Birding Trail.
Stable Chase Nature Sanctuary		1999	16 acres (6.5 ha)	39.7529°N 85.9648°W	
Stacy Park		1998	0.25 acres (0.10 ha)	39.7568°N 86.1336°W	Features include benches, a picnic table, a playground, and a shelter. It is named for Stacy Ramsey.
Stamm Park		2004	2 acres (0.81 ha)	39.8835°N 86.1302°W	Features woods and open space.
Stanley Strader Park		1935	15 acres (6.1 ha)	39.74406°N 86.1147°W	Originally named Bethel Park, it was renamed to honor former Indianapolis City–County Councilor Stanley Strader in 2023.
Stout Field Park		1974	14 acres (5.7 ha)	39.7327°N 86.2284°W	Features include a basketball court, open space, picnic tables, a playground, restrooms, a shelter, a splash pad, and walking paths. It is named for the former Stout Field airport.
Stringtown Park		1970	2 acres (0.81 ha)	39.7692°N 86.1910°W	
Tarkington Park		1945	10 acres (4.0 ha)	39.8272°N 86.1580°W	Features include benches, basketball courts, a café and restroom building, open space, picnic tables, a playground, a splash pad, and tennis courts. A $6 million renovation of the park was completed in 2017. It is named for author Booth Tarkington.
(A. J.) Thatcher Golf Course		1967	39 acres (16 ha)	39.7733°N 86.2396°W	
(A. J.) Thatcher Park		1974	22 acres (8.9 ha)	39.7704°N 86.2403°W	
Thompson Park		1999	9 acres (3.6 ha)	39.6934°N 86.0513°W	
Tolin-Akeman Park		1989	6 acres (2.4 ha)	39.6914°N 86.0927°W	Features include open space, a playground, and a shelter.
Town Run Trail Park		2000	127 acres (51 ha)	39.9269°N 86.0782°W	Accessible from East 96th Street, the park features a singletrack mountain bike course and 7 miles (11 km) of natural surface hiking trails. It is maintained by the Hoosier Mountain Bike Association. The park's southernmost reaches overlap with Oliver's Woods Nature Preserve, managed by the Central Indiana Land Trust. Accessible from North River Road, the preserve contains 16 acres (6.5 ha) of woods and 37 acres (15 ha) of restored prairie-savanna. Both properties hug the western bank of the White River.
University Park		1876	4 acres (1.6 ha)	39.771999°N 86.157017°W	University Park occupies the southernmost block of the Indiana World War Memorial Plaza, a national historic landmark district. Its bilaterally symmetrical layout was designed in 1914 by George Kessler as part of the Indianapolis Park and Boulevard System. Depew Memorial Fountain is the park's focal point. Other features include walking paths, floral gardens, benches, and statuary. It is managed by the Indiana War Memorials Commission. The park is included in the Indianapolis Park and Boulevard System.
Upper Fall Creek Loop Trail		1999	63 acres (25 ha)	39.8940°N 85.9976°W	
Virginia B. Fairbanks Art & Nature Park†		2010	100 acres (40 ha)	39.8261°N 86.1888°W	The park houses several site-specific art installations by national and international artists. Other features include bike racks, meadows, a quarry pond, walking paths, wetlands, woods, an Indiana Pacers Bikeshare station, and the Ruth Lilly Visitors Pavilion. It is owned and maintained by the Indianapolis Museum of Art. Admission to the park is free. Virginia B. Fairbanks, the wife of benefactor Richard M. Fairbanks, is the park's namesake. It is part of the Indy Birding Trail.
Virginia Lee O'Brien Park		1956	4 acres (1.6 ha)	39.8005°N 86.0678°W	Features include a basketball court, open space, and a playground.
Wallace F. Holladay Preserve at Ameriplex†		2013	52 acres (21 ha)	39.6737°N 86.3098°W	Managed by the Central Indiana Land Trust.
Washington Park		1923	128 acres (52 ha)	39.8147°N 86.1145°W	Features include basketball courts, a disc golf course, a family center, open space, playgrounds, shelters, walking paths, wetlands, and woods. It is home to the Indianapolis Metropolitan Police Department North District offices and The Headquarters: Mountain Bike Skills Park. The original Indianapolis Zoo was located in the park from 1964 to 1987. It is part of the Indy Birding Trail.
Watkins Park		1913	19 acres (7.7 ha)	39.7998°N 86.1712°W	
Watson Road Bird Preserve		1925	4 acres (1.6 ha)	39.8235°N 86.1413°W	Features undeveloped woods. It is part of the Indy Birding Trail.
Wes Montgomery Park		1970	37 acres (15 ha)	39.8204°N 86.0762°W	The park was named in honor of jazz guitarist Wes Montgomery in 1972.
Whispering Hills Golf Course		1995	132 acres (53 ha)	39.7362°N 85.9770°W	9-hole golf course
White River State Park		1979	250 acres (100 ha)	39.766667°N 86.169722°W	Bisected by its namesake, the White River, the park is home to several major attractions, including the Indianapolis Zoo and White River Gardens, the Eiteljorg Museum, the Indiana State Museum, the Medal of Honor Memorial, the National Collegiate Athletic Association (NCAA) headquarters and Hall of Champions, Everwise Amphitheater, Victory Field, and two national historic sites. Sections of the Canal Walk and Indianapolis Cultural Trail traverse the park. It is managed by the White River State Park Development Commission. It is part of the Indy Birding Trail.
Wildwood Park		2008	9 acres (3.6 ha)	39.7158°N 86.0253°W	
Willard Park		1907	11 acres (4.5 ha)	39.7668°N 86.1276°W	The park is included in the Indianapolis Park and Boulevard System.
Windsor Village Park		1953	8 acres (3.2 ha)	39.8043°N 86.0555°W	
WISH Park		1995	16 acres (6.5 ha)	39.8864°N 86.2059°W	Features include benches, a playground, a shelter, and woods. Crooked Creek is the park's northern boundary. The park is named for local television station WISH-TV which donated the land to the city.
Wolf Run Park		2013	53 acres (21 ha)	39.6973°N 85.9886°W	
Woollen's Garden of Birds and Botany		1909	55 acres (22 ha)	39.8634°N 86.0514°W	Contains a 38-acre (15 ha) state nature preserve. The park is heavily wooded and hugs the southern bank of Fall Creek. It is named for William Watson Woollen. The park is included in the Indianapolis Park and Boulevard System.
Wright's Fields		2004	39 acres (16 ha)	39.7500°N 85.9542°W	

== Defunct ==
Name	Image	Est.	Size	Location	Description
Richard and Annette Bloch Cancer Survivors Park		1995	1 acre (0.40 ha)	39.7806°N 86.1745°W	The park was demolished in 2017.

== See also ==
- List of attractions and events in Indianapolis
- List of Indiana state parks
