= Lawrence, Indiana =

- City
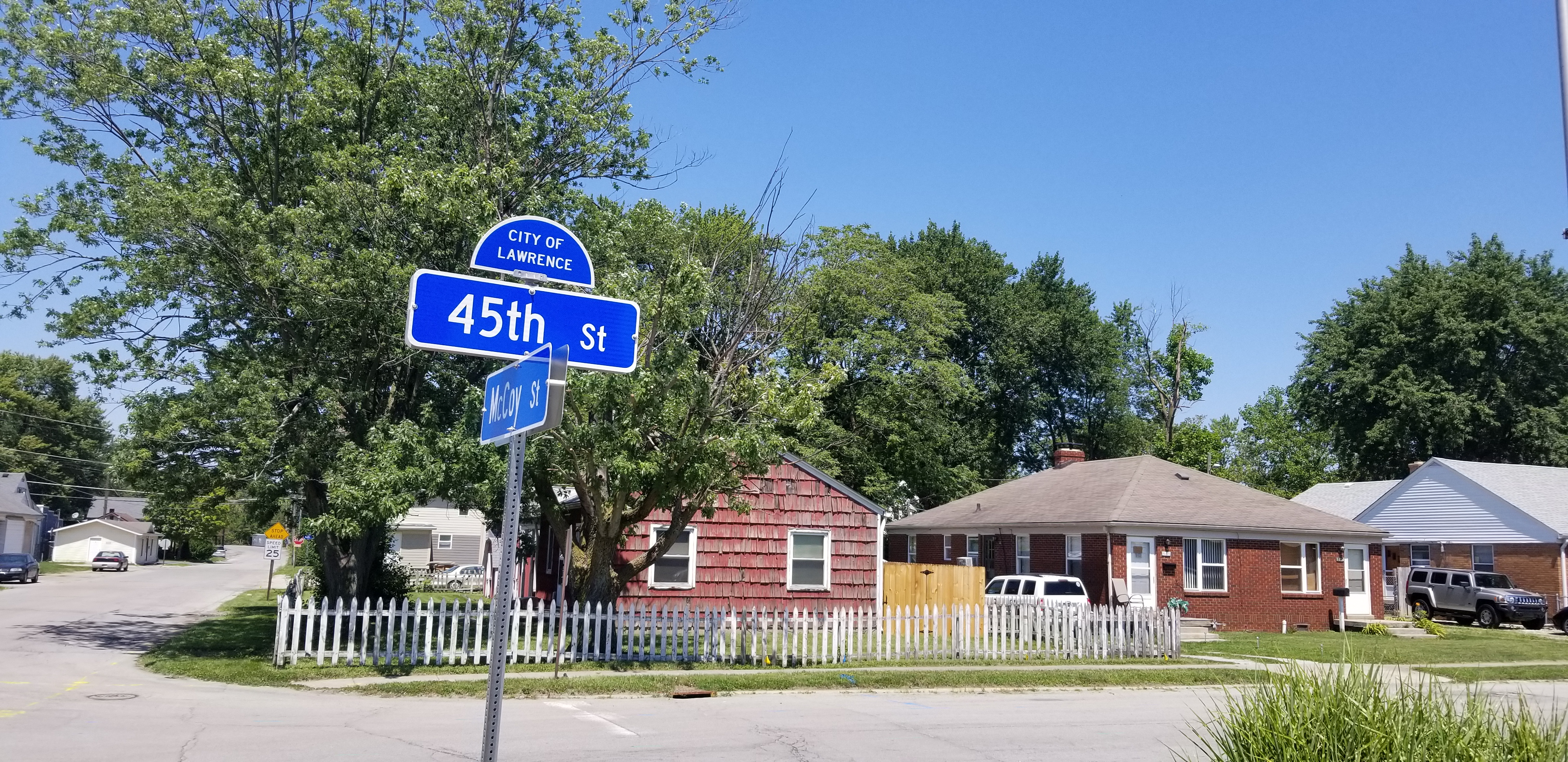
- Houses along 45th street in Lawrence

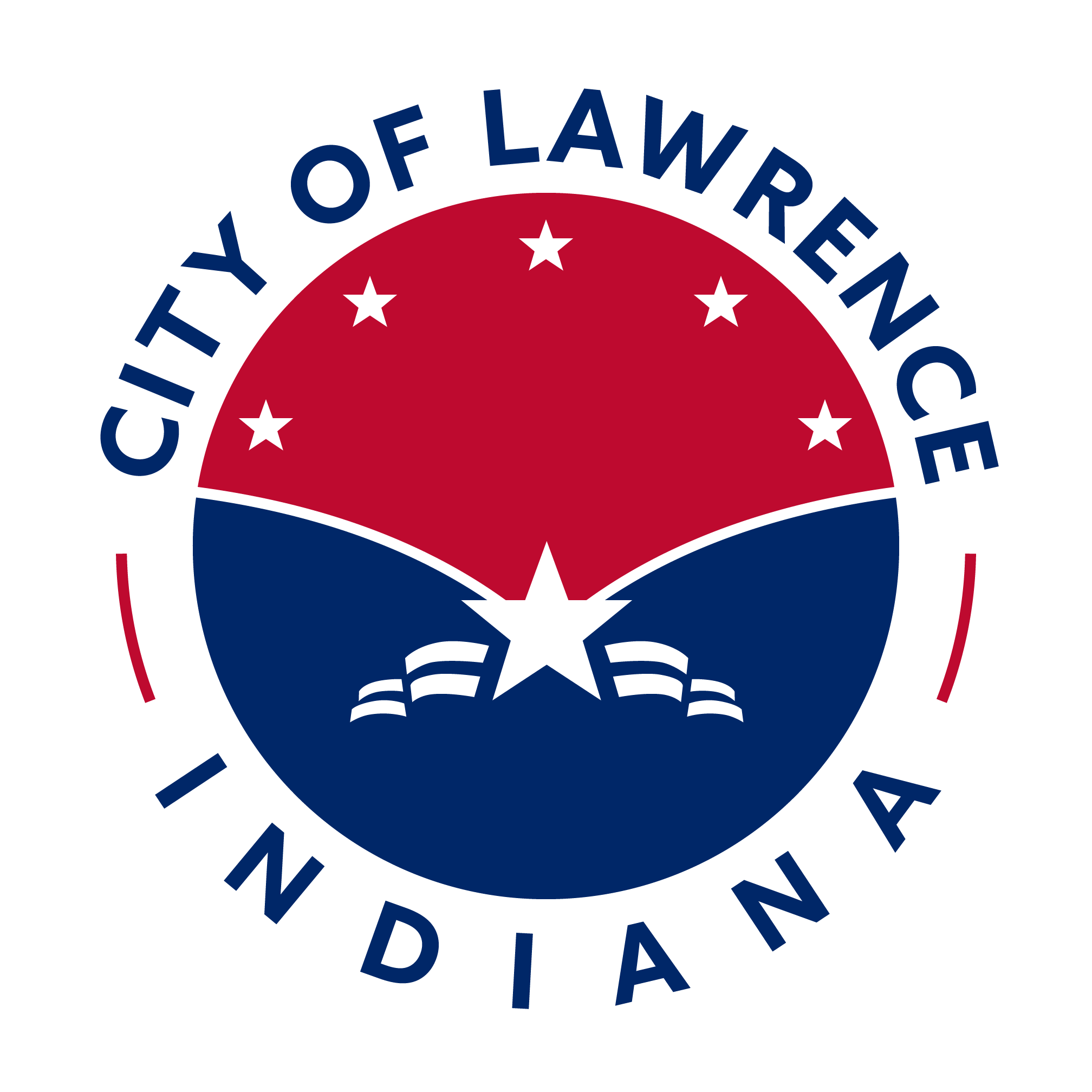
- Flag Seal

- Location in Marion County, Indiana
- Coordinates: 39°52′03″N 85°59′26″W
- Country: United States
- State: Indiana
- County: Marion
- Township: Lawrence

Government
  - Mayor: Deborah Whitfield (D)
  - Common Council: Tyrrell Giles (D, 1st); Rick Wells (D, 2nd); Sherron Freeman (D, 3rd); Carlos Jennings (D, 4th); Zach Cramer (D, 5th); Kristina Krone (D, 6th); Lisa Chavis (D, AL); Liz Masur (D, AL); Betty Robinson (D, AL)

Area
  - Total: 20.24 sq mi (52.43 km^{2})
  - Land: 20.15 sq mi (52.18 km^{2})
  - Water: 0.097 sq mi (0.25 km^{2})
- Elevation: 853 ft (260 m)

Population (2020)
  - Total: 49,370
  - Density: 2,450.4/sq mi (946.11/km^{2})
- Time zone: UTC-5 (EST)
  - Summer (DST): UTC-4 (EDT)
- ZIP codes: 46216, 46226, 46235, 46236
- Area codes: 317, 463
- FIPS code: 18-42426
- GNIS feature ID: 2395647
- Website: www.cityoflawrence.org

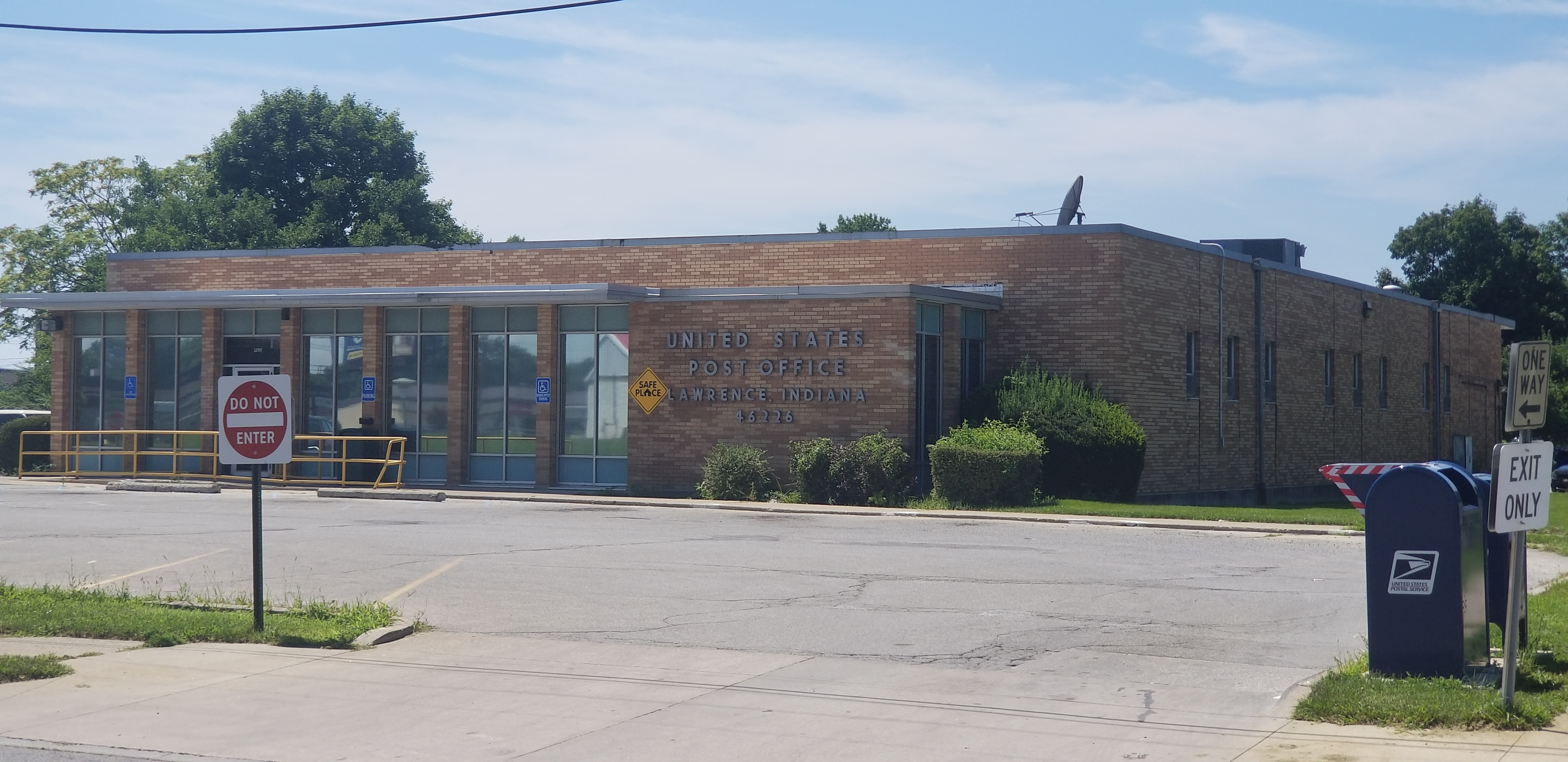
United States Post Office in Lawrence

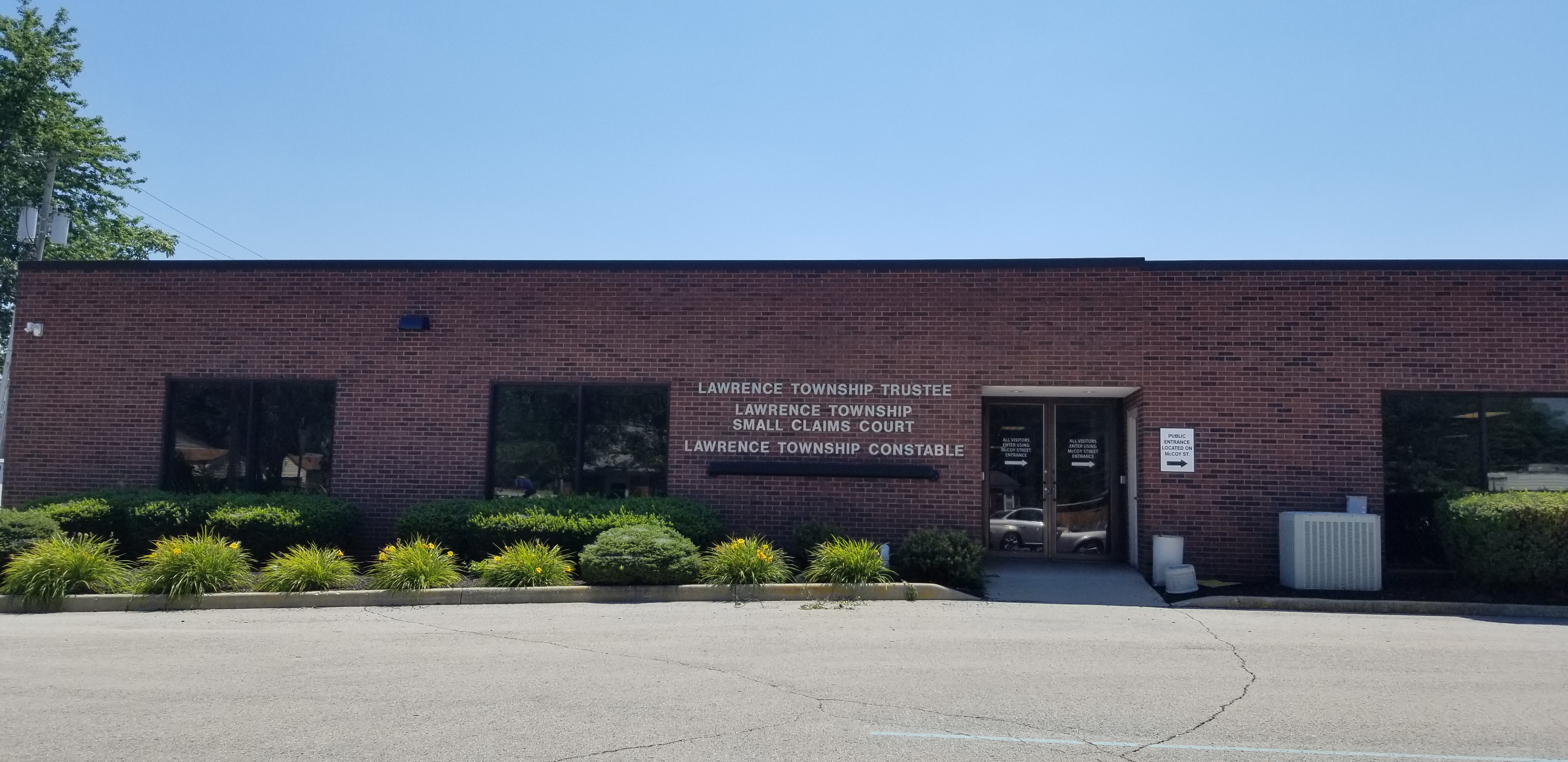
Building housing government offices in Lawrence

Lawrence is a city in Lawrence Township, Marion County, Indiana, United States. It is one of four "excluded cities" in Marion County. The city is home to Fort Benjamin Harrison within Fort Harrison State Park. The population was 49,370 at the 2020 census. The city is on the northeast side of Indianapolis.

== History ==
The municipality was platted in 1849 under the name "Lanesville", but other names were tried because there was already another Lanesville in Indiana. The name "Jamestown", in honor of the town's founder James White, was used for a while, but in 1866 the Marion County Commissioners approved the name "Lawrence", which is also the name of the township in which it is located. The name was in honor of Captain James Lawrence, naval hero of the War of 1812. In 1929 the citizens of Lawrence voted to become an independent town, where they first established the town marshal, as well as other parts of government.

In 1969, Indianapolis and Marion County adopted a unified government structure known as Unigov. Lawrence is one of four "excluded cities" and therefore retains its own municipal government. Its citizens vote not only for the mayor and council of Lawrence, but also for the mayor of Indianapolis and representatives on the Indianapolis City-County Council.

== Geography ==
Lawrence is located in northeastern Marion County. It is bordered to the east by Hancock County, including the town of McCordsville. Downtown Indianapolis is 9 miles (14 km) to the southwest. U.S. Route 36 (Pendleton Pike) runs through the city, leading northeast 22 miles (35 km) to Pendleton. US 36 intersects Interstate 465, the Indianapolis beltway, at that highway's Exit 42 at the southwest corner of Lawrence. Exit 40 on I-465, with East 56th Street and North Shadeland Avenue, is along the western border of Lawrence.

According to the U.S. Census Bureau, Lawrence has a total area of 20.25 square miles (52.45 km^{2}), of which 0.10 square miles (0.26 km^{2}), or 0.48%, are water. Fall Creek, a southwest-flowing tributary of the White River flows through the northwest part of the city, and in places forms the city's northwest boundary. Fort Harrison State Park is in the northwest part of the city as well.

=== Climate ===
The climate in this area is characterized by hot, humid summers and generally mild to cold winters. According to the Köppen Climate Classification system, Lawrence has a humid continental climate with hot summers and year around precipitation, abbreviated "Dfa" on climate maps.

Climate data for Lawrence, Indiana (1991-2020 precipitation normals)Elevation: 850 feet (260 metres). Lat: 39.8803° N Lon: 85.9535° W
Month	Jan	Feb	Mar	Apr	May	Jun	Jul	Aug	Sep	Oct	Nov	Dec	Year
Average precipitation inches	3.35	2.90	3.48	4.71	4.89	5.96	4.60	3.65	3.34	3.35	3.62	2.75	46.6
Average precipitation mm	85	74	88	120	124	151	117	93	85	85	92	70	1,184
Source: NOAA

== Demographics ==
Historical population
Census	Pop.	Note	%±
1880	253		—
1930	840		—
1940	1,087		29.4%
1950	1,951		79.5%
1960	10,103		417.8%
1970	16,353		61.9%
1980	25,591		56.5%
1990	26,763		4.6%
2000	38,915		45.4%
2010	46,001		18.2%
2020	49,370		7.3%
Source: US Census Bureau

=== 2020 census ===
As of the 2020 census, Lawrence had a population of 49,370. The median age was 35.9 years. 25.8% of residents were under the age of 18 and 12.6% of residents were 65 years of age or older. For every 100 females there were 92.6 males, and for every 100 females age 18 and over there were 88.5 males age 18 and over.

100.0% of residents lived in urban areas, while 0.0% lived in rural areas.

There were 19,067 households in Lawrence, of which 35.2% had children under the age of 18 living in them. Of all households, 42.0% were married-couple households, 18.5% were households with a male householder and no spouse or partner present, and 31.4% were households with a female householder and no spouse or partner present. About 27.0% of all households were made up of individuals and 9.1% had someone living alone who was 65 years of age or older.

There were 20,354 housing units, of which 6.3% were vacant. The homeowner vacancy rate was 1.2% and the rental vacancy rate was 10.7%.

Racial composition as of the 2020 census
Race	Number	Percent
White	23,573	47.7%
Black or African American	14,302	29.0%
American Indian and Alaska Native	393	0.8%
Asian	761	1.5%
Native Hawaiian and Other Pacific Islander	39	0.1%
Some other race	5,645	11.4%
Two or more races	4,657	9.4%
Hispanic or Latino (of any race)	9,768	19.8%

=== 2010 census ===
At the 2010 United States census, there were 46,001 people, 17,864 households, and 11,949 families in the city. The population density was 2,285.2 inhabitants per square mile (882.3/km^{2}). There were 19,515 housing units at an average density of 969.4 per square mile (374.3/km^{2}). The racial makeup of the city was 63.2% White, 25.8% African American, 0.4% Native American, 1.4% Asian, 0.1% Pacific Islander, 5.7% from other races, and 3.5% from two or more races. Hispanic or Latino of any race were 11.2%.

Of the 17,864 households 38.7% had children under the age of 18 living with them, 44.2% were married couples living together, 17.5% had a female householder with no husband present, 5.3% had a male householder with no wife present, and 33.1% were non-families. 27.6% of households were one person and 8% were one person aged 65 or older. The average household size was 2.56 and the average family size was 3.12.

The median age was 34.2 years. 28.2% of residents were under the age of 18; 8.1% were between the ages of 18 and 24; 29.3% were from 25 to 44; 24.9% were from 45 to 64; and 9.6% were 65 or older. The gender makeup of the city was 47.5% male and 52.5% female.

The median household income was $54,254 in Lawrence compared to the state median of $48,393. Roughly 31% of Lawrence residents have a bachelor's degree compared to 22.7% of all Indiana residents.

=== 2000 census ===
At the 2000 United States census, there were 38,915 people, 14,853 households, and 10,337 families in the city. The population density was 1,937.8 inhabitants per square mile (748.2/km^{2}). There were 16,292 housing units at an average density of 811.3 per square mile (313.2/km^{2}). The racial makeup of the city was 78.58% White, 15.51% African American, 0.30% Native American, 1.80% Asian, 0.08% Pacific Islander, 1.86% from other races, and 1.87% from two or more races. Hispanic or Latino of any race were 4.73%.

Of the 14,853 households 39.8% had children under the age of 18 living with them, 52.1% were married couples living together, 13.0% had a female householder with no husband present, and 30.4% were non-families. 24.8% of households were one person and 5.9% were one person aged 65 or older. The average household size was 2.60 and the average family size was 3.13.

The population was diversified at 29.9% under the age of 18, 7.7% from 18 to 24, 36.2% from 25 to 44, 18.0% from 45 to 64, and 8.2% 65 or older. The median age was 32 years. For every 100 females, there were 95.2 males. For every 100 females age 18 and over, there were 91.3 males.

The median household income was $47,838 and the median family income was $56,609. Males had a median income of $38,924 versus $30,406 for females. The per capita income for the city was $22,543. About 4.8% of families and 6.7% of the population were below the poverty line, including 8.2% of those under age 18 and 5.1% of those age 65 or over.

== Education ==
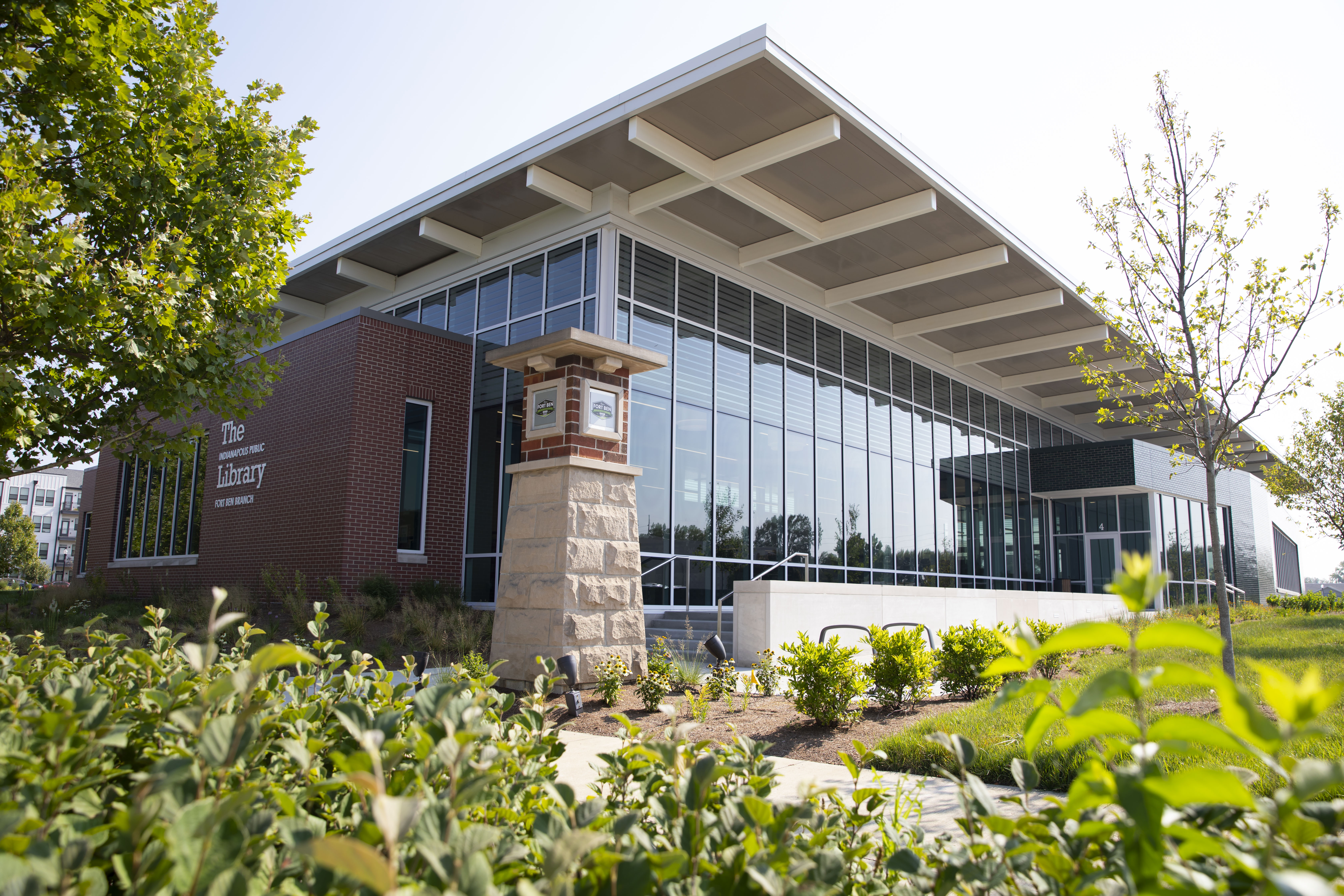
Fort Ben branch of the Indianapolis Public Library in 2023

Public K-12 education in the city is provided by the Metropolitan School District of Lawrence Township, the ninth largest and one of the fastest growing districts in Indiana. It operates four Early Learning Centers, eleven elementary magnet schools (grades 1–6), two middle schools (grades 7–8), two high schools (Lawrence Central and Lawrence North), a center for innovation and technology, and an alternative setting high school. In the 2018–2019 academic year there were 16,035 students with a high school graduation rate of 92.7%. Lawrence Township schools offer high ability programs, Advanced Placement (AP and ACP), International Baccalaureate Program, vocational and career education programs, and bilingual programs. The district holds 45 state championships and 5 national titles in various inter-curricular competitions. Those titles include championships in basketball (Lawrence North - 2006) and marching band (Lawrence Central -1998, 2001 and 2004). The diversity makeup of the district is .05% American Indian, 23.5% White, 45.3% Black, 6.9% Multiracial, 1.1% Asian, .05% Pacific Islander, and 23.1% Hispanic, as of the 2017–18 school year.

Ivy Tech Community College operates a campus in Lawrence that is associated with the Downtown Indianapolis campus. Lawrence is home to a single public library, a branch of the Indianapolis Public Library.

== Notable residents ==
- Mike Conley, basketball player
- Forrest Landis, actor
- Pat McAfee, sports radio host, All-Pro NFL punter for the Indianapolis Colts
- Greg Oden, basketball player
- John Slagle, baseball player

== See also ==
- List of Indianapolis neighborhoods
- List of cities surrounded by another city
