= Southeastway Park =

Municipal park in Indianapolis, Indiana, US

- Interactive map of Southeastway Park
- Type: City park
- Location: 5624 South Carroll Road, Indianapolis, Indiana 46163
- Coordinates: 39.687°N 85.959°W
- Area: 188 acres (76 ha)
- Created: 1972
- Operator: Indy Parks and Recreation
- Open: All year
- Website: parks.indy.gov/parks/southeastway-park/

Southeastway Park is a 188-acre (76 ha) nature park managed by the Indianapolis Parks and Recreation Department. The park is located in the southeast corner of Marion County, Indiana, at 5624 South Carroll Road.

== Park facilities and buildings ==
- Paved walking/biking trail (~2.5 miles)
- Sledding hill
- Playground
- Shelters (6)
- Picnic sites (3)
- Education center

== Seasonal park activities ==
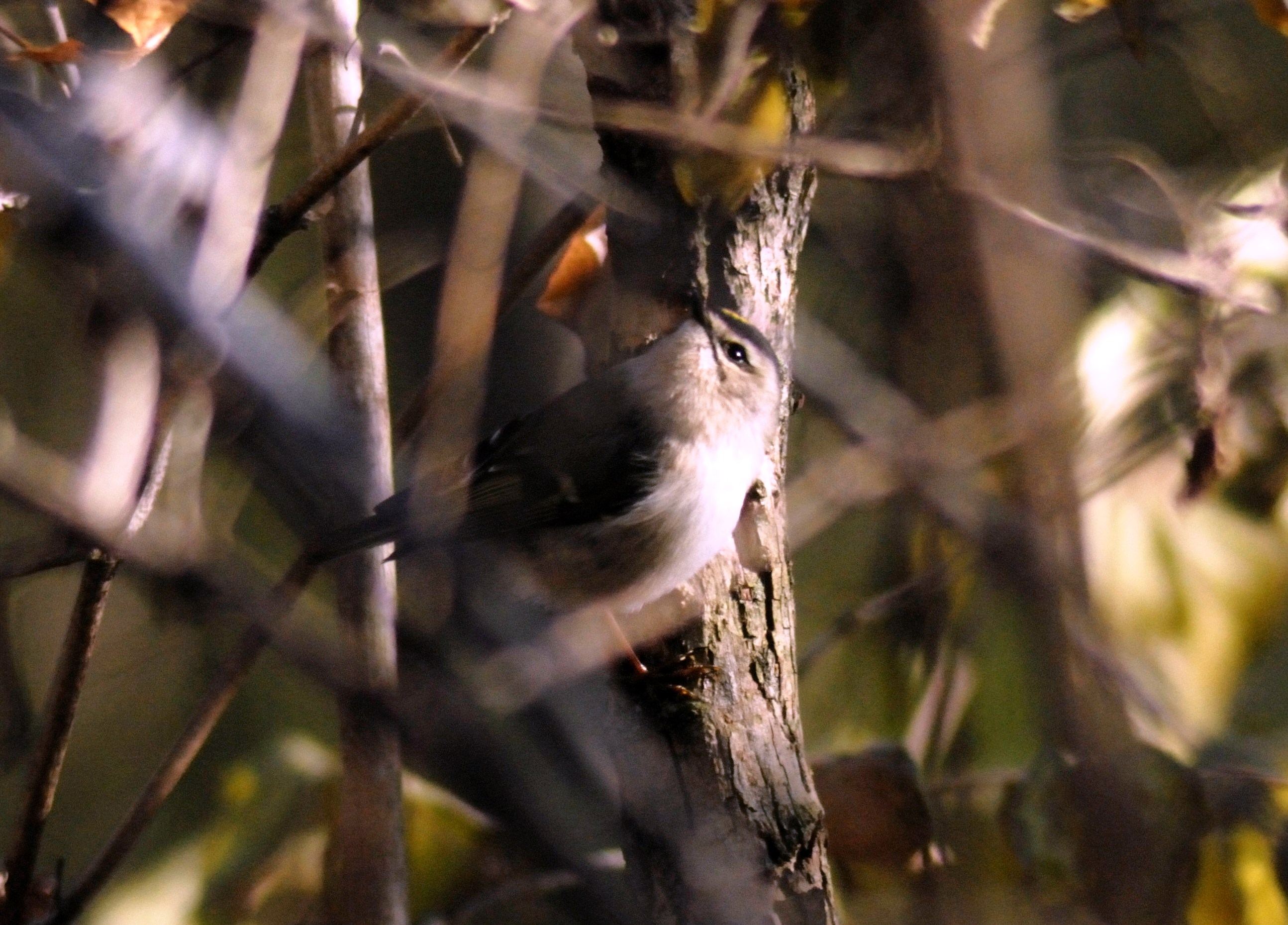
A golden-crowned kinglet at the park in 2013.

Seasonal activities include:

- Mid-February through mid-March: Maple Syrup Making
- Last Sunday in August: Bug Fest
- June and July: Summer Camps
- Late September through early November: Hayride Season

== Natural areas ==
There are a variety of natural habitats on the property including:

- 80 acres (32 ha) of forest
- A pond and wetland
- Open fields and meadows
- A prairie preserve
- Buck Creek

== See also ==
- List of parks in Indianapolis
