= Pleasant Run Greenway =

Shared-use path in Indianapolis, Indiana, US

- Length: 6.9 mi (11.1 km)
- Location: Indianapolis, Indiana
- Trailheads: Ellenberger Park; 39°46′31″N 86°04′26″W; Garfield Park; 39°44′09″N 86°08′48″W
- Use: Hiking, Biking, Rollerblading
- Season: Year round during daylight
- Surface: Mostly Asphalt
- Website: www.indy.gov

The Pleasant Run Greenway, also known as the Pleasant Run Trail, is a shared-use path in Indianapolis, Indiana. It runs for 6.9 miles (11.1 km) from Ellenberger Park, through Christian Park, to Garfield Park. It follows the general course of Pleasant Run Creek as it flows to the south and west. Most of the greenway is located within the parkway on one side or the other of the creek; the parkway itself is part of the historic Indianapolis Park and Boulevard System. In several places, the greenway is routed on sidewalks of city streets due to existing structures and facilities that make the parkway itself discontinuous.

== Construction ==
In 1994, the Indianapolis Department of Parks and Recreation presented the Indianapolis Greenways Plan to establish a system of linear parks consisting of 14 corridors; one of those was Pleasant Run. Construction of the greenway began in 1997 and was officially opened in August 1998. Much of the greenway lies within the existing Pleasant Run Parkway; the parkway itself had been constructed in the 1920s as part of the Indianapolis Park and Boulevard System.

Most of the greenway is asphalt and is 5–12 feet (1.5–3.7 m) wide. Exceptions are in Ellenberger Park, where crushed limestone is used, and those places where the path uses existing sidewalks along streets. Every quarter-mile is marked; the first marker in Ellenberger Park is mile 2 because of plans to extend the trail further east.

== Route ==
The Pleasant Run Greenway starts in the southwest corner of Ellenberger Park in Irvington and follows the north bank of the creek west and south to the Kin Hubbard Memorial, a small park bounded by Emerson Avenue, New York Street, and Pleasant Run Parkway North Drive. From there the trail heads south along Emerson over the creek to Washington Street. It follows Washington Street west back across the creek and again runs along the north bank for a short distance until it turns south across Pleasant Run Parkway North Drive. A pathway to Thomas Carr Howe Community High School connects at that point. The greenway continues along the north bank until both it and the parkway cross the creek under the CSX (formerly Baltimore and Ohio) railroad bridge. At Brookville Road, the trail again crosses from the south bank to the north bank and passes through Christian Park, connecting with several paths within the park.

At the intersection of English and Avon avenues, the Pleasant Run Greenway diverges from the creek and is routed along sidewalks on English Avenue to Pleasant Run Parkway North Drive. The greenway continues west between the parkway and the creek to Keystone Avenue, at which point it is again routed on sidewalks south on Keystone and east on Prospect Street until it again meets the creek. There are signs marking the trail in those locations where it uses city sidewalks.

From Prospect Street, the greenway runs along the north bank of Pleasant Run, passing by Orange Park. Near Spruce Street, a pedestrian bridge takes the trail to the south bank, where it continues in a westward direction under the Interstate 65 bridge. At Shelby Street, the greenway intersects with a cycle track that connects with the Indianapolis Cultural Trail to the north. West of Shelby Street, the greenway turns south with the creek, passing through the southeast corner of the Bates-Hendricks neighborhood. South of Beecher Street, it travels under the Indianapolis Belt Railroad tracks and enters the north edge of Garfield Park, passing on a boardwalk under the Raymond Street bridge. The greenway ends at Pagoda Drive in the park, but several paths within the park connect with it.

== Future plans ==
In 2021, the city began design work to extend the trail west from Garfield Park along the creek to Bluff Road, with an extension on Bluff Road north to Raymond Street and south to Troy Avenue. The new segments allow a future connection to the Wapahani Trail along the White River. Construction is scheduled to start in Spring 2023 and finish in late Fall 2023 and will cost $4 million. In the same time period, a $5 million project will rehabilitate and improve the existing segments of the trail between Garfield Park and Prospect Avenue and between English Avenue and Ritter Avenue.

An extension south and east from Ellenberger Park toward Arlington Avenue and the Pennsy Trail is in the city's long range plans. A connector running north along the west side of Shelby Street to Fountain Square and the Indianapolis Cultural Trail was completed in 2011.

== See also ==
- List of parks in Indianapolis
- Transportation in Indianapolis
