= Fort Harrison State Park =

State park in Lawrence, Indiana, US

- IUCN category III (natural monument or feature)
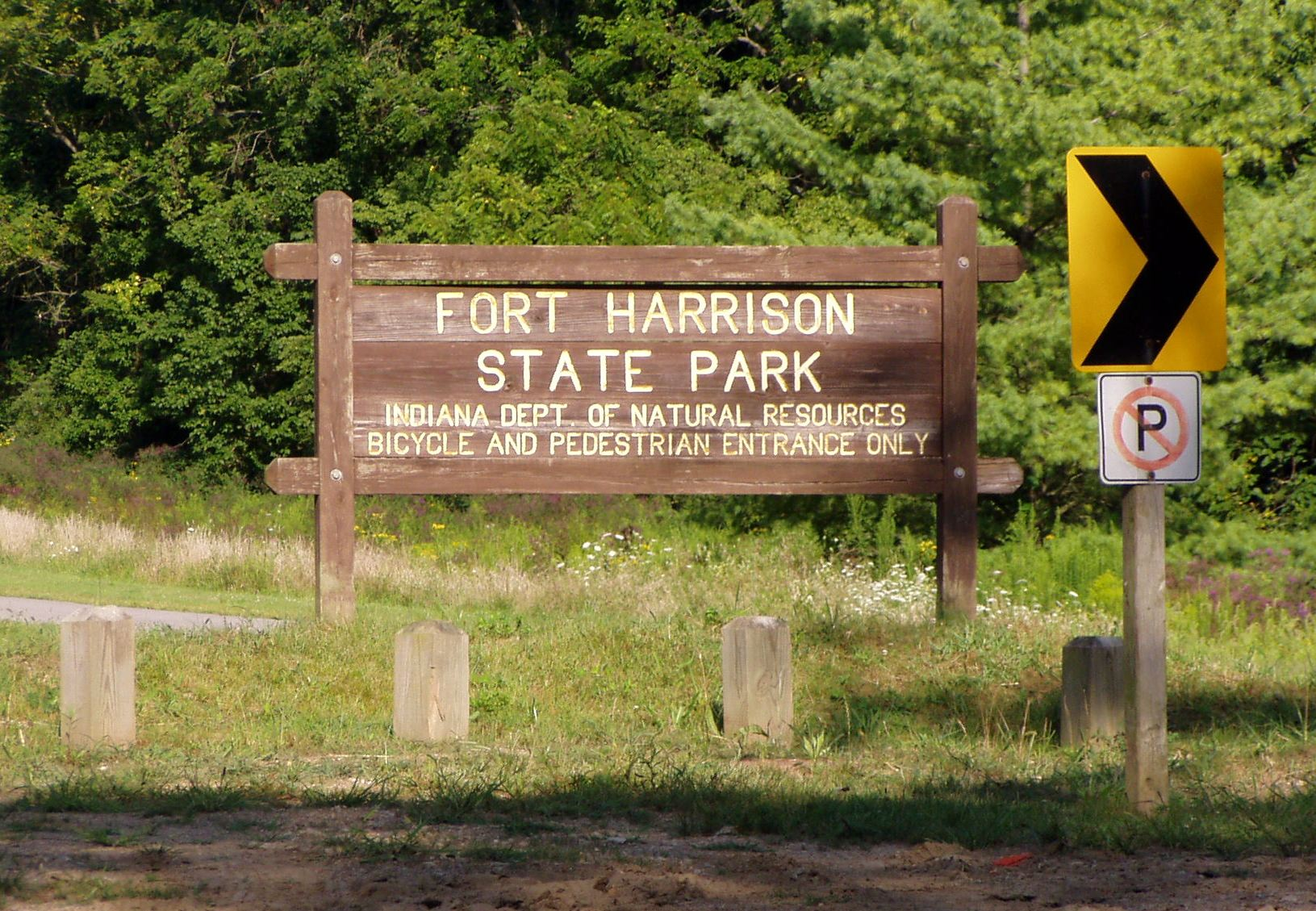

- Location within Indiana
- Location: Marion County, Indiana, USA
- Nearest city: Lawrence, Indiana
- Coordinates: 39°52′N 86°01′W
- Area: 1,700 acres (6.9 km^{2})
- Established: 1996
- Visitors: 889,232 (in 2018–2019)
- Governing body: Indiana Department of Natural Resources
- Website: Fort Harrison State Park

Fort Harrison, sometimes called Fort Ben, is an Indiana state park located in Lawrence, Indiana, United States, and occupies part of the former site of Fort Benjamin Harrison. The park features a former Citizen's Military Training Camp, Civilian Conservation Corps camp, and World War II prisoner of war camp. There are also picnicking and walking/jogging trails including a connection to the Fall Creek Greenway. The park receives nearly 900,000 visitors annually.

The park was 1 of 14 Indiana State Parks that were in the path of totality for the 2024 solar eclipse, with 3 minutes and 48 seconds of totality.

== History ==
Fort Harrison was opened in 1906 by United States President Theodore Roosevelt, honoring former President Benjamin Harrison, who was from Indianapolis. The idea came from Lieutenant Colonel Russell Harrison, son of recently deceased Benjamin Harrison, who wanted to keep a military facility in Indianapolis due to the legacy of such Indianapolis military facilities as Camp Morton. General Order #117 on June 28, 1904, ordered a land purchase for military use nine miles (14 km) from downtown Indianapolis.

The fort was finished in 1908, after the construction of brick barracks, headquarters, officer's houses, and hospital. Other support structures, such as horse stables, were finished at the time. The Tenth Infantry Regiment immediately moved in after these facilities were constructed.

The fort represented the first effort to make a national army using state militia forces. It acted as classrooms, soldier support, and troop reception for all United States military activities from World War I to Operation: Desert Storm. During World War II, the base had a prisoner of war camp.

During the 1970s and 1980s, the area around Fort Harrison was attracting residents of Asian descent and, to a lesser extent, Hispanics.

The athlete village for the 1987 Pan American Games was built inside Fort Benjamin Harrison. Dining, lodging, nightclubbing, and practice facilities were constructed within the village.

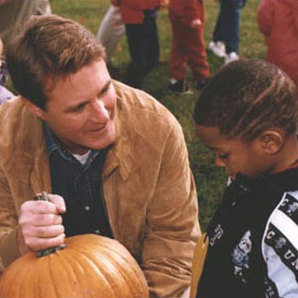
Governor Evan Bayh joins youth at the opening of Fort Benjamin Harrison State Park

Following the Cold War, the United States government began downsizing by closing bases. Thus, in 1991 Fort Harrison of Indianapolis was decommissioned. The base had several amenities, including an officers' club, three officers' homes, special housing for Very Important Persons, and an eighteen-hole golf course. It also featured one of the largest hardwood forests in central Indiana.

The United States Department of the Interior chose in 1995 to give 1,700 acres (6.9 km^{2}) of Fort Harrison's 2,500 acres (10 km^{2}) to the Indiana Department of Natural Resources for use as a state park, similar to how Charlestown State Park started in Southern Indiana.

During the time that the Indiana Governor's mansion was being redone in 2003 to make it accessible to handicapped individuals, Indiana governor Frank O'Bannon and his wife lived at the Harrison House, the park's inn, as their official residence. Prior to the formation of the park, it had been a nurses dorm during World War II and later a VIP residence. They spent most of the year living there. When state governor's mansion was finished, the O'Bannon's moved out and the Harrison House was once again available for the general public to use.

Current plans include moving the Bell Ford Bridge from Jackson County, Indiana, into the park, allowing an additional way for pedestrians and bikers to cross Fall Creek.

== Features ==
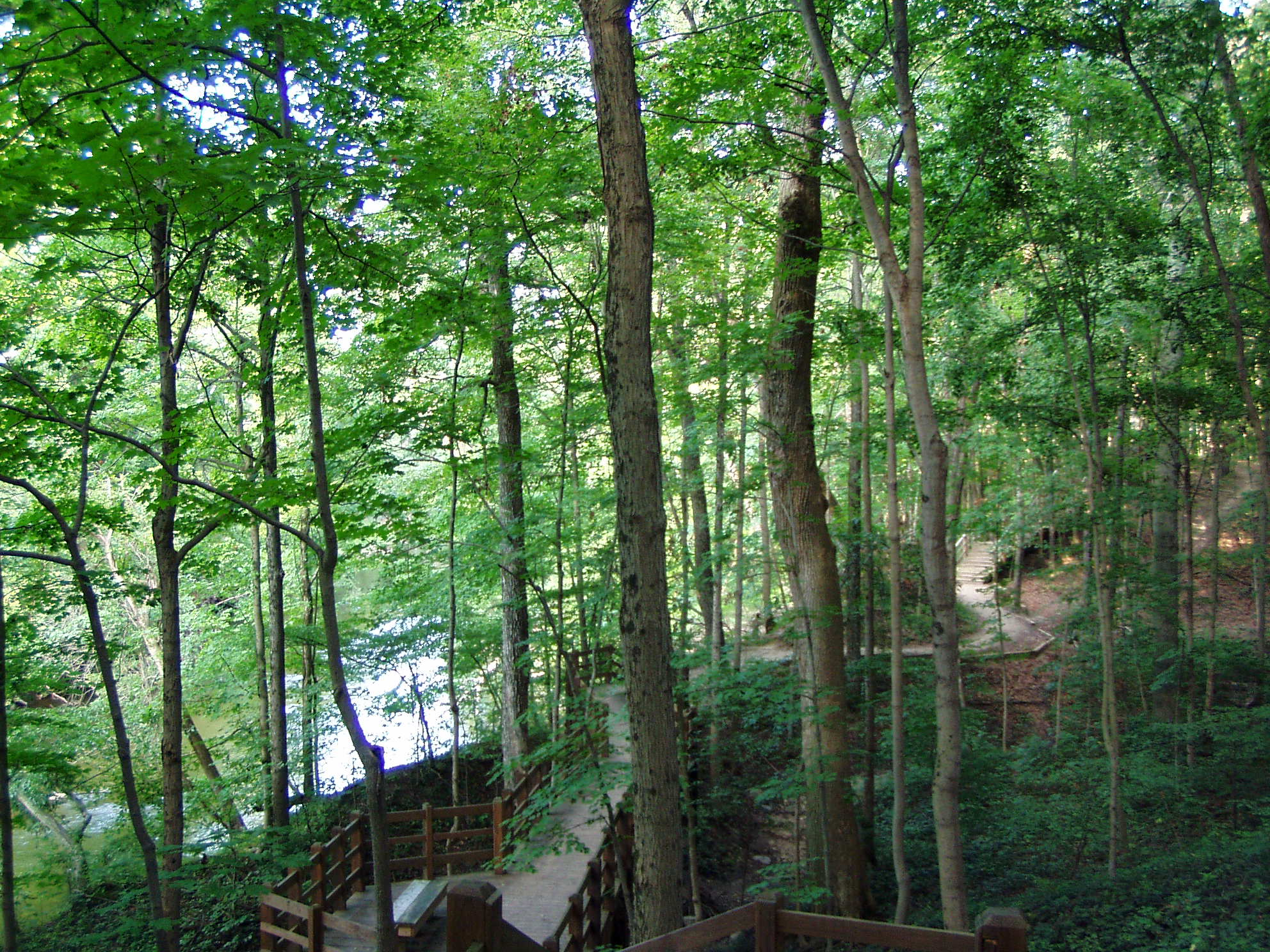
Fall Creek Boardwalk

Unlike most state parks in Indiana, Fort Harrison is a day-use park, with its only overnight facilities being the inn, The Fort Golf Resort, which was the old officers' club. The fort's eighteen-hole golf course makes the park popular with Indianapolis golfers; it was redesigned by Pete Dye after the fort's closure, making it a 72-par course. Only golfers are allowed on the course. The VIP housing became the Harrison House Suites, and the four Officer's Homes are available for overnight lodging as well.

There are six hiking trails, and one for horseback riding, with horse rentals available. One of the hiking trails, Harrison Trace Trail, is paved, making it available for bikers and in-line skating. The longest of the trails is the Lawrence Creek Trail, which is a 4.2-mile (6.8 km), single-track trail for mountain biking and walking. The wildflowers take the place of the ravines and steep hillsides typical of state parks in southern Indiana. Biking and fishing are also available; the park office sells the necessary state fishing permit. In winter, ice fishing is available. An interpretive center at the park office informs visitors of the history and natural environment of the park.

Fall Creek runs for 3.5 miles (5.6 km) inside the park, with smaller tributaries feeding it that are also within the boundaries of the park. The creek is also used for canoeing and kayaking. Beaver, deer, frogs, squirrels, and turtles are the most commonly seen wildlife in the park; a heron pond is off-limits for visitors.

== Museum of 20th Century Warfare ==
The Museum of 20th Century Warfare is located in Building 711 in the Historic Camp Glenn area of the park with exhibits about the Fort and technology, artifacts, uniforms and soldiers of the 20th Century. A 14-foot (4.3 m) model of the USS Indianapolis is part of the permanent exhibit. Temporary exhibits are changed every three months. The museum's programming includes re-enactments and living history camps. There is no admission fee other than the fee charged to enter the park.

== See also ==
- List of urban parks by size
- List of Indiana state parks
- List of parks in Indianapolis
- List of attractions and events in Indianapolis
