= Southwestway Park =

Municipal park in Indianapolis, Indiana, US

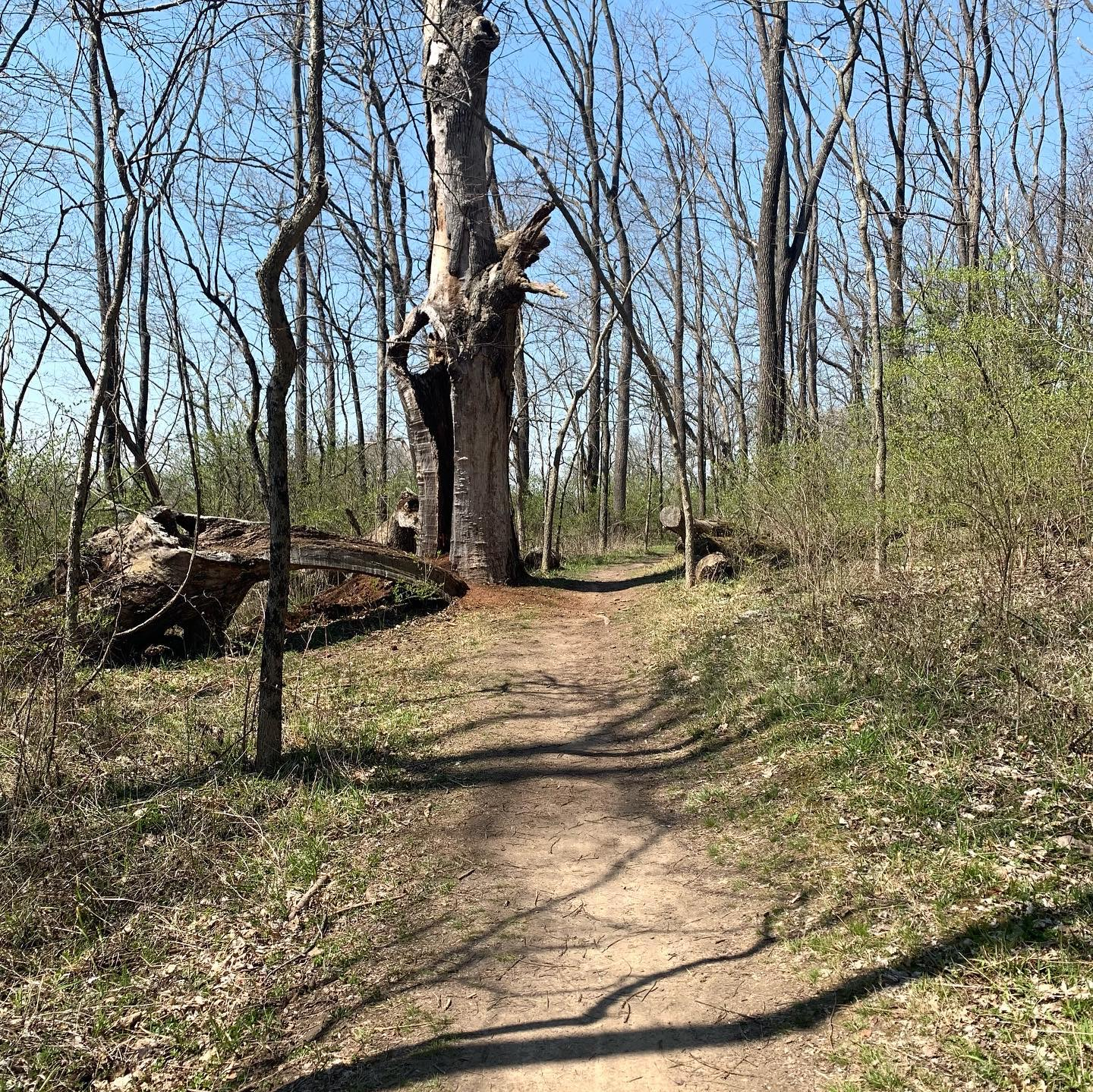
- Interactive map of Southwestway Park
- Type: City park
- Location: 8400 Mann Road, Indianapolis, Indiana
- Coordinates: 39.650°N 86.242°W
- Area: 487.5 acres (197.3 ha)
- Created: 1961
- Operator: Indy Parks and Recreation
- Open: All year
- Website: funfinder.indy.gov#/details/90

Southwestway Park is the third largest park in Indianapolis, Indiana. It is located at 8400 Mann Road in the southwestern section of the city and covers approximately 587 acres (238 ha) on the west bank of the White River, bordered on the north by Southport Road, on the west by Mann Road, and extending south past Ralston Avenue.

== History ==
In the late 1950s and early 1960s, the Indianapolis Parks Department began efforts to develop large regional parks in each quadrant of Marion County. To that end, it obtained 150 acres (61 ha) of farmland between Mann Road and the White River, 100 acres (40 ha) of which were developed in 1968 into a 9-hole municipal golf course.

In 1968 the city bought an additional 167 acres (68 ha) on both sides of Mann Road north of the golf course. At the time it was anticipated that the area would continue to be used, as it had been when privately owned, for off-road motorcycling; however, environmental concerns prevented that from happening. In late 1984 the city obtained another 40 acres (16 ha) between Mann Road and the White River north of the 1968 purchase. The total acreage at that time was 357 acres (144 ha) including the golf course.

By 2004, the golf course, now known as Winding River Golf Course, had been expanded into an 18-hole, par-72 facility with a driving range, covering 175.8 acres (71.1 ha). The park itself contained 210.7 acres (85.3 ha).

Finally, in 2002, the Indianapolis Parks Foundation and the city together bought 101 acres (41 ha) north and adjacent to Southwestway Park and along the White River, bringing the total size of the park and golf course to 487.5 acres (197.3 ha).

== Park activities and buildings ==
- Hiking trails
- Mountain biking trails
- Horseback riding trails
- Playground
- Shelter (1)
- Soccer fields (8)
- Baseball/softball diamonds (3)
- Winding River Golf Course (18-hole course + driving range)

== Natural areas ==
Southwestway Park contains some of the most outstanding geological features in central Indiana. Some of the most notable features include:

- Floodplain forest
- Mesic upland forest
- Graminoid fen
- Successional fields
- Cottonwood Lake
- Kame
- White River

A pair of bald eagles have hatched young near the White River in Southwestway Park.

== See also ==
- List of parks in Indianapolis
