= Indianapolis Cultural Trail =

Urban path and park in Indiana, US

Indianapolis Cultural Trail: A Legacy of Gene & Marilyn Glick
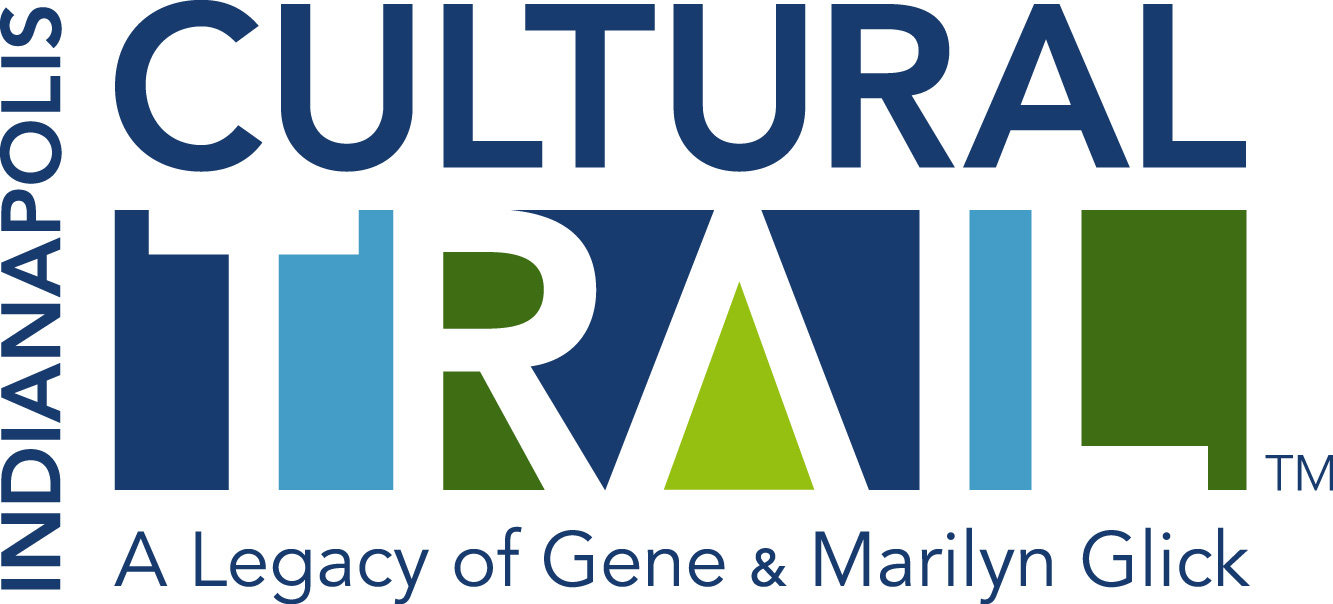

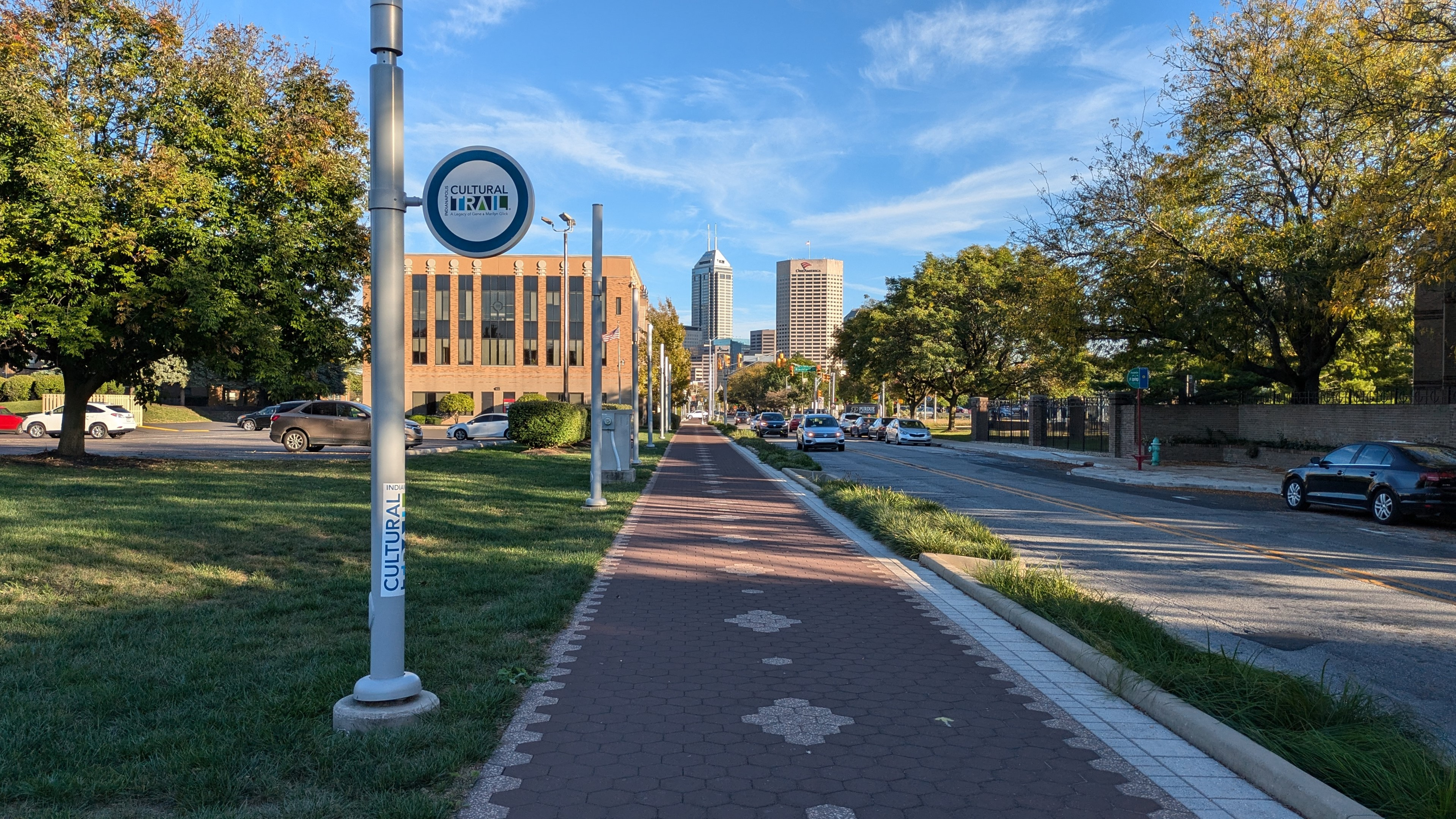
- Indianapolis Cultural Trail by Indiana Avenue
- Interactive route mapInteractive route map
- Type: Urban linear park; shared-use path
- Location: Indianapolis, Indiana, U.S.
- Coordinates: 39°46′36.7″N 86°09′39.4″W
- Area: Approx. 6 acres (2.4 hectares) of plants & greenspace; 10 miles (16 km) of shared-use paths
- Created: 2007; 19 years ago
- Operator: Indianapolis Cultural Trail Inc.
- Visitors: 1 million
- Status: Open
- Public transit
- Website: www.indyculturaltrail.org

The Indianapolis Cultural Trail, officially the Indianapolis Cultural Trail: A Legacy of Gene & Marilyn Glick, is a 10-mile-long (16 km) urban shared-use path and linear park located in the vicinity of downtown Indianapolis, Indiana. The trail is often compared to other popular bicycle and pedestrian paths across the U.S. and has inspired similar projects throughout the U.S. and Canada.

== Description ==
The Indianapolis Cultural Trail is an urban multi-use trail. The trail is identifiable with concrete pavers set in hexagonal tiling, providing visual continuity. Street furniture, trash receptacles, signage, and lighting are also consistent throughout the trail's route.

=== Route ===
The Indianapolis Cultural Trail is composed of a downtown loop and three spurs. The northeastern spur follows Massachusetts Avenue, terminating at its connection to the Monon Trail near 10th and Bellefontaine streets. The southeastern spur follows Virginia Avenue, terminating at its intersection with Prospect and Shelby streets in the Fountain Square neighborhood. A two-way cycle track along Shelby Street links the trail with the Pleasant Run Greenway. A short southern spur follows Capitol Avenue, connecting the Indiana Convention Center and Lucas Oil Stadium, terminating at South Street. In 2020, plans started for a two-mile extension to the trail which bring areas of Indiana Avenue and South Street in closer proximity to the city center.

The trail intersects with the Canal Walk, a 3-mile-long (4.8 km) pedestrian loop flanking the former Indiana Central Canal.

=== Glick Peace Walk ===
The walk can be accessed at W. Walnut Street between N. Meridian Street and N. Capitol Avenue.

=== Public art ===
In November 2026, the Indianapolis Cultural Trail's public art collection comprised 11 works ranging in size and medium.

- Ann Dancing (2007), Julian Opie
- Care/Don't Care (2010), Jamie Pawlus
- Chatham Passage (2010), Sean Derry
- Glick Peace Walk (2010), Smock Fansler Corporation, Tarpenning LaFollette Company, GRT Glass Design, & Santarossa Mosaic and Tile
- Indiana Avenue Sound Experience (2024), Lamp Records
- Looking Through Windows (2012), Michael Kuschnir
- Moving Forward (2013), Donna Sink
- Poet's Place
- Prairie Modules 1 & 2 (2010), M12
- Swarm Street (2012), Acconci Studio
- Talking Wall (2010), Bernard Williams

In addition to commissioned art, the Arts Council of Indianapolis's "Indy Arts Guide" lists 61 pieces of public art along or near the trail as of January 2019.

In August 2018, Citizens Energy Group partnered with the Harrison Center to install 20 artist-designed manhole covers along the trail. The initiative sought to bring public attention to Indianapolis waterways and the $2 billion DigIndy project to address the city's combined sewer overflows.

== History ==
After 12 years of planning and six years of construction, the Indianapolis Cultural Trail: A Legacy of Gene & Marilyn Glick officially opened in 2013. The $62.5 million public-private partnership, spurred by an initial donation of $15 million by philanthropists Gene B. Glick and Marilyn Glick, resulted in 8 miles (13 km) of urban bike and pedestrian corridors linking the city's cultural districts with neighborhoods, IUPUI, and every significant arts, cultural, heritage, sports and entertainment venue downtown.

== Indiana Pacers Bikeshare ==
Indianapolis Cultural Trail Inc. operates, maintains, and promotes the city's public bicycle-sharing system, Indiana Pacers Bikeshare, consisting of 50 stations and 525 bicycles. The Cultural Trail, in partnership with BCycle and the Herbert Simon Family Foundation, launched Pacers Bikeshare on April 22, 2014, with an initial 29 stations and 251 bicycles. An expansion was completed on September 5, 2019, nearly doubling available bikes and docking stations. About half of the Indianapolis Cultural Trail's annual $1 million budget is allocated to managing the program, which is self-sustaining through bike rental fees, annual memberships, grants, and sponsorships.

== Impact ==
According to the Indianapolis Business Journal, early grant applications predicted $863 million in development generated within a 0.5 miles (0.80 km) radius of the trail. An Indiana University Public Policy Institute report released in March 2015 found that assessed value of properties within 500 feet (150 m) of the trail increased by $1 billion from 2008 to 2014. Other key finds from the report:

- Trail usage along the trail exceeds that of most other Indianapolis trails and greenways
- Users feel safe on the trail
- Exercise and recreation is the primary reason for use
- Businesses located on the trail have hired additional employees
- Property values have increased along and near the trail
- Users reported spending and economic impact tied to trail usage

A report by JLP+D released in June 2026 found that construction of the eight original miles of the trail for $63 million had caused assessed values of properties along the trail to increase at twice the rate of property values in the city as a whole, resulting in a $3 billion increase in assessed value.

The trail has also been considered a boon for convention business and inspired interest from cities throughout the U.S. and Europe.

== See also ==
- Indianapolis Cultural Districts
- List of attractions and events in Indianapolis
- List of cycleways in Indiana
- List of parks in Indianapolis
- Transportation in Indianapolis
