= Town Run Trail Park =

Municipal park in Indianapolis, Indiana, US

Coordinates: 39.9269°N 86.0782°W

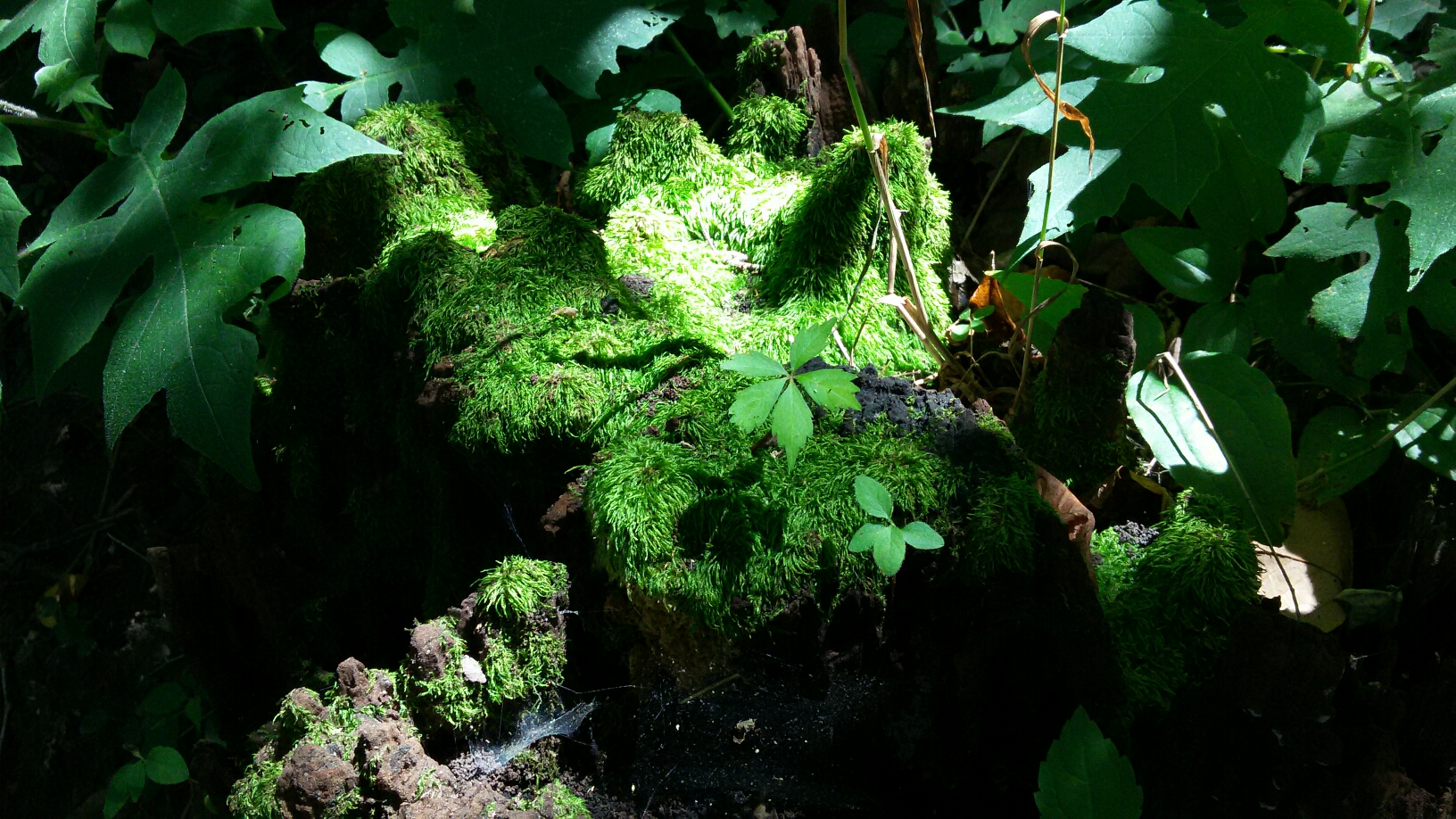
Moss growing on a rock in the park

Town Run Trail Park is a 127-acre (0.51 km^{2}) natural resource park in Indianapolis, Indiana, United States. The facility is owned by Indy Parks and Recreation and was made possible through donations from Martin Marietta Aggregates, Mr. Oliver Dougherty, and R.N. Thompson Associates Inc. It is located near the White River on East 96th Street between Keystone Avenue and Allisonville Road. The main attraction at the park is a singletrack mountain bike course. The 7.25-mile (11.67 km) course, located in the northeastern area of Indianapolis, is maintained by the Hoosier Mountain Bike Association. It offers a variety of terrain for mountain bikers with beginner to intermediate skill leveled trails.

== See also ==
- List of parks in Indianapolis
