= Fall Creek Greenway =

Shared-use path in Indianapolis, Indiana, US

Coordinates: 39°49′50.4″N 86°07′32.5″W

Fall Creek Greenway, often referred to as Fall Creek Trail, is a shared-use path in Indianapolis, Indiana, United States. The greenway begins at the border of Fort Harrison State Park on Boy Scout Road in the northeast corner of the city, meandering southwest along Fall Creek. The greenway terminates at Burdsal Parkway and the Indiana Central Canal in Indianapolis's Riverside neighborhood. It is nearly 7 miles (11 km) long and connects with the Monon Trail just south of Fall Creek Parkway near the Mapleton-Fall Creek neighborhood. A second and final phase will complete a gap in the greenway between its current terminus to the intersection of Indiana Avenue and 10th Street.

There are multiple trailheads along the trail, as well as three canoe slipways. In addition to Fort Harrison State Park, the greenway provides direct access to several public parks, including Skiles Test Nature Park, George E. Kessler Park, and Fall Creek & 30th Park. There are very few street crossings, with the primary exception at 38th Street near Keystone Avenue. It follows the original George Kessler Boulevard Plan.

== See also ==
- List of parks in Indianapolis
- Transportation in Indianapolis
