= Golden Thirteen =

The Golden Thirteen
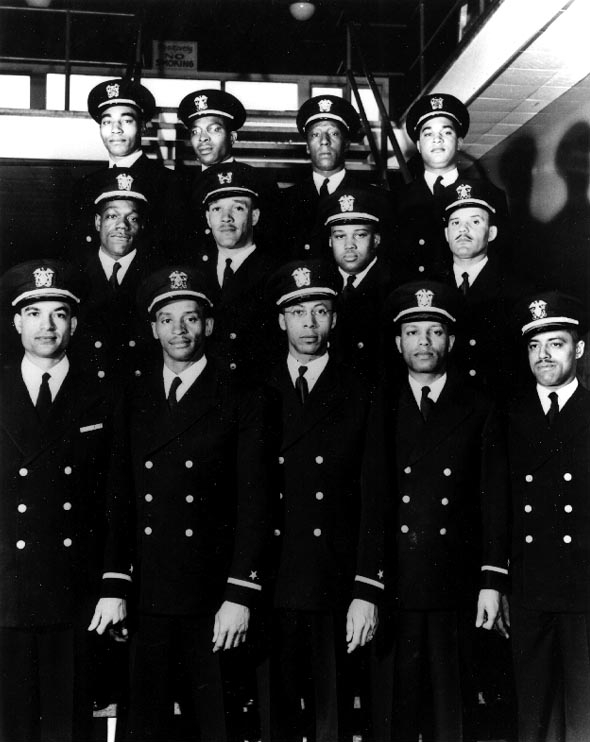
- The Golden Thirteen, photographed on 17 March 1944. Top row: John Walter Reagan, Jesse Walter Arbor, Dalton Louis Baugh, Frank Ellis Sublett. Middle row: Graham Edward Martin, Charles Byrd Lear, Phillip George Barnes, Reginald E. Goodwin. Bottom row: James Edward Hair, Samuel Edward Barnes, George Clinton Cooper, William Sylvester White, Dennis Denmark Nelson.
- Active: 1944 –
- Country: United States of America
- Branch: Navy

The Golden Thirteen were the thirteen African American enlisted men who became the first African American commissioned and warrant officers in the United States Navy.

== History ==
Throughout the history of the United States until the end of World War I, the Navy had enlisted African Americans for general service, but they were barred from joining from 1919 to 1932. From 1893 onwards, African Americans could only join the Navy’s Messman’s and Steward’s branches, which not only segregated African Americans from the rest of the Navy community, but also precluded them from becoming commissioned officers.

In June 1941, President Franklin D. Roosevelt signed the executive order #8802 prohibiting ethnic and racial discrimination by federal agencies or contractors involved in the defense industry.

In April 1942, thanks to protests and pressure from civil rights leaders and the black press, the Navy allowed black men into the general service ratings for the first time.

Responding to pressure from First Lady Eleanor Roosevelt and Assistant Secretary of the Navy Adlai Stevenson, in January 1944, the Navy began an officer training course for 16 African-American enlisted men at Camp Robert Smalls, Recruit Training Center Great Lakes (now known as Great Lakes Naval Training Station), in Illinois.

To ensure their failure, the normal training period of 16 weeks was reduced to 8 weeks for the black cadets. When they realized that someone in the Navy wanted them to wash out, the cadets covered up the windows of their barracks and studied all night. When they were tested, the entire group passed with high marks. Disbelief in the chain of command that an all-black cadet class could achieve higher scores than an all-white one meant that the black sailors had to suffer the indignity of retaking their tests. Again, all 16 passed; the class average at graduation was 3.89.

Although all sixteen members of the class passed the course, only twelve were commissioned in March 1944: Jesse Walter Arbor (1914–2000), Phillip George Barnes (1909-1949), Samuel Edward Barnes (1915-1997), Dalton Louis Baugh Sr. (1912-1985), George Clinton Cooper (1916-2002), Reginald Ernest Goodwin (1907-1974), James Edward Hair (1915–1992), Graham Edward Martin (1919-2006), Dennis Denmark Nelson (1907-1979), John Walter Reagan (1920–1994), Frank Ellis Sublett (1920-2006), and William S. White (1914-2004) were commissioned as Ensigns; Charles Byrd Lear (1916–1946) was appointed as a Warrant Officer. Augustus Alves, J.B. Pinkney, and Lewis "Mummy" Williams also passed the exam but were not given commissions. The reason why only 13 gained rank, despite all the men being successful in training was never explained, but it is noted that this rate brought the pass-rate down to the level of the average class of white candidates.

Because Navy policy barred blacks from being assigned to combat ships, the first class of black officers were assigned to command shore logistics units, small tug and tender ships, and training African American enlisted.

== Postwar ==
President Harry S. Truman officially desegregated the U.S. military in 1948. At the time of the Golden Thirteen's commissioning, there were approximately 100,000 African-American men serving in the United States Navy's enlisted ranks.

Of the 13, most separated just after the war as LTJG. Three, Baugh, Nelson, and Reagan, remained until retiring as LCDR. Samuel Barnes became the athletic director at Howard University and served on the executive committee of the NCAA, the first African-American to do so. Dalton Baugh served as an instructor of the Navy Engineering School and later at MIT. Dennis Nelson served as a Public Affair Officer and submitted a report entitled "The Integration of the Negro into the U.S. Navy", which was subsequently published as a book in 1951. William White would go on to serve as the presiding judge of the Cook County Juvenile Court and justice of the Illinois Appellate Court.

Frank E. Sublett, the last living member of the group, died in 2006.

== The Golden Thirteen's Legacy ==
On Monday April 11, 1982, the Golden Thirteen were brought together for a weeklong celebration of their 1944 accomplishment. On the evening of April 12, 1982, they were feted at a reception by the Tidewater Chapter of the National Naval Officers Association at the Breezy Point Officers Club. The reception was covered by all of the local Tidewater media as well as national media. On the morning of April 13, the men were heloed out to the USS KIDD where they were given a three-day VIP tour of the ship and updated on the "modern Navy." The men departed the KIDD on the 15th after two days of "at sea" orientation and national media interviews. The highlight of the at sea cruise was the unexpected reunion of the men with one of their "long lost" classmates, Mr. James Hair, who learned of the reunion from television interviews he saw while at home in Brooklyn, NY. The morning of 16 April 1982, the men were flown to Washington, DC, via Eastern Airlines, given a tour of the Pentagon, and met with and had a two-hour lunch with the Secretary of the Navy, John Lehman, then Chief of Naval Operations, Admiral James Watkins, and the Chief of Navy Information, RADM Bruce Newell. The week concluded as it began, with a media covered reception, hosted by the DC Chapter of the National Naval Officers Association at the Clarendon Hotel across from the Pentagon. "In The Shadow of The Golden Thirteen - A Nice Negro Story" by Gerald Collins https://www.amazon.com/Shadow-Golden.../dp/1421835428

In 1987, the U.S. Navy reunited the seven living members to dedicate a building in their honor at Great Lakes Naval Recruit Training Command, Illinois. Today, Building 1405 at RTC Great Lakes, where recruits first arrive for basic training, is named "The Golden Thirteen" in honor of them.

In 2006, ground was broken on a World War II memorial in North Chicago, Illinois to honor the Golden Thirteen and Doris Miller. Today, the Golden 13 Memorial is located at Veterans Memorial Park, Sheridan Boulevard & 18th Street.

== See also ==
- List of African-American firsts
- Wesley A. Brown, first African American graduate of Annapolis (1949).
- Samuel L. Gravely Jr., first African American commissioned through the V-12 program (14 Nov 1944), first to attain flag rank (1971).
- Harriet Pickens, one of the first two female African American commissioned Navy officers (13 Nov 1944).
- Frances Wills, one of the first two female African American women commissioned Navy officers (13 Nov 1944).
- United States Service Academies Class of 1980 - first class of women at the various service academies (included several African American women)
