= Indiana Pacers Bikeshare =

Public cycle-sharing system in Indiana, US

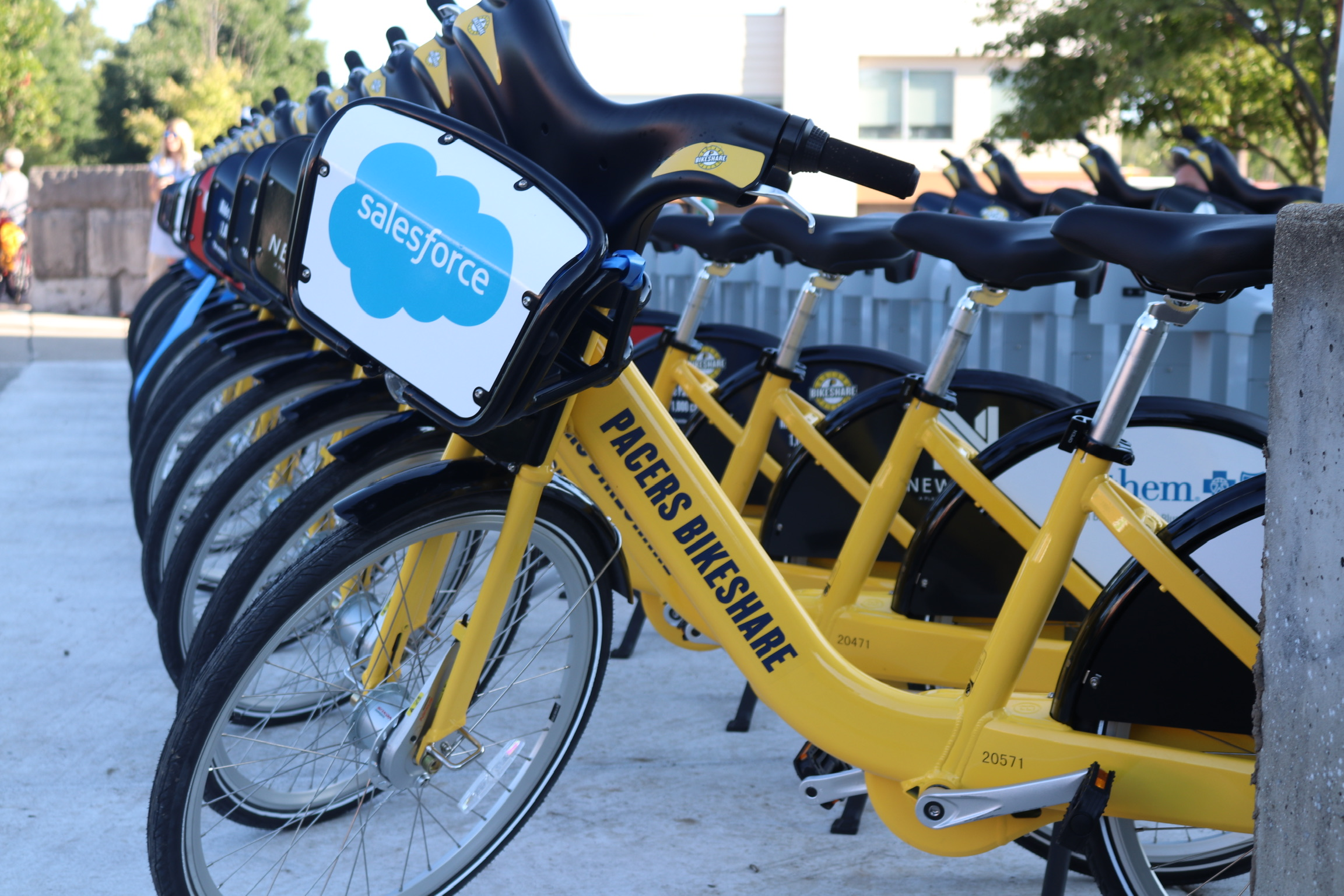
- A docking station in Broad Ripple Village along the Monon Trail

Overview
- Owner: Indianapolis Cultural Trail, Inc.
- Area served: Indianapolis, Indiana
- Transit type: Bicycle-sharing system
- Number of stations: 54
- Headquarters: 132 W. Walnut St. Indianapolis, IN 46204
- Website: pacersbikeshare.org

Operation
- Began operation: April 22, 2014; 12 years ago
- Operator: Pacers Bikeshare (Indianapolis Cultural Trail)
- Number of vehicles: 525
Interactive map of docking stations

Indiana Pacers Bikeshare, also known as Pacers Bikeshare, is a public bicycle-sharing system in Indianapolis, Indiana, U.S. The service is operated by BCycle, a public bicycle-sharing company owned by Trek Bicycle Corporation. The system launched in April 2014 with 250 bikes and 25 docking stations and has since expanded to 525 bikes and 54 stations. The service is available to users 24/7 year-round. Pacers Bikeshare is owned by and managed as a program of the Indianapolis Cultural Trail.

== History ==
Pacers Bikeshare launched on April 22, 2014, with 25 docking stations and 250 bicycles centered on or near the Indianapolis Cultural Trail in the vicinity of downtown Indianapolis. Initial startup and maintenance costs were provided by the Herbert Simon Family Foundation. Herbert Simon is chairman emeritus of Simon Property Group and owner of the Indiana Pacers. At the time of its launch, the system was the only bike-share service in the U.S. sponsored by a professional sports franchise. The Federal Highway Administration's (FHWA) Congestion Mitigation and Air Quality Improvement (CMAQ) Program granted an additional $1 million.

In its first year, Pacers Bikeshare sold 28,206 one-day passes and 1,581 annual passes with users logging more than 108,000 trips for a total distance of 218,259 miles (351,254 km). The program was considered a success by officials. An additional docking station was installed at OneAmerica Tower on December 2, 2015.

In its second year, annual membership had grown to 2,878 with users logging more than 117,000 trips for a total distance of 243,782 miles (392,329 km). In 2016, Pacers Bikeshare began information sharing GPS tracking data with academic researchers at IUPUI to understand trends useful to the fields of public health and tourism management. The system added two docking stations and 26 bikes in October 2016.

Officials announced the system's first major expansion on May 15, 2018. A second $960,000 CMAQ grant from FHWA and $240,000 gift from the Herbert Simon Family Foundation and an unnamed private donor funded the expansion. Indianapolis Cultural Trail, Inc. solicited input on docking station placement at public meetings, farmer's markets, library branches, and online, largely siting docking stations near popular attractions and close proximity to existing pedestrian, bicycle, and public transit infrastructure. The expansion, completed on September 5, 2019, nearly doubled available bikes and docking stations.

In November 2019, Indianapolis-based health insurer Anthem donated $1 million to support the system's programs and ongoing maintenance.

In October 2023, officials announced that 250 electric bicycles would be introduced to the system in spring 2024. The expansion is funded through a $1.2 million federal grant and contribution from the Herbert Simon Family Foundation.

In May 2024, officials announced the IndyRides Free program, which allows residents of Marion County unlimited 30-minute rides at no cost after an initial registration.

In August 2025, officials announced 3 new stations on the campus of Butler University, along with 30 additional electric bikes added to the system. They also launched the Butler University Pass, which provides unlimited free 30-minute trips to anyone with an active Butler University email address.

== Payment ==
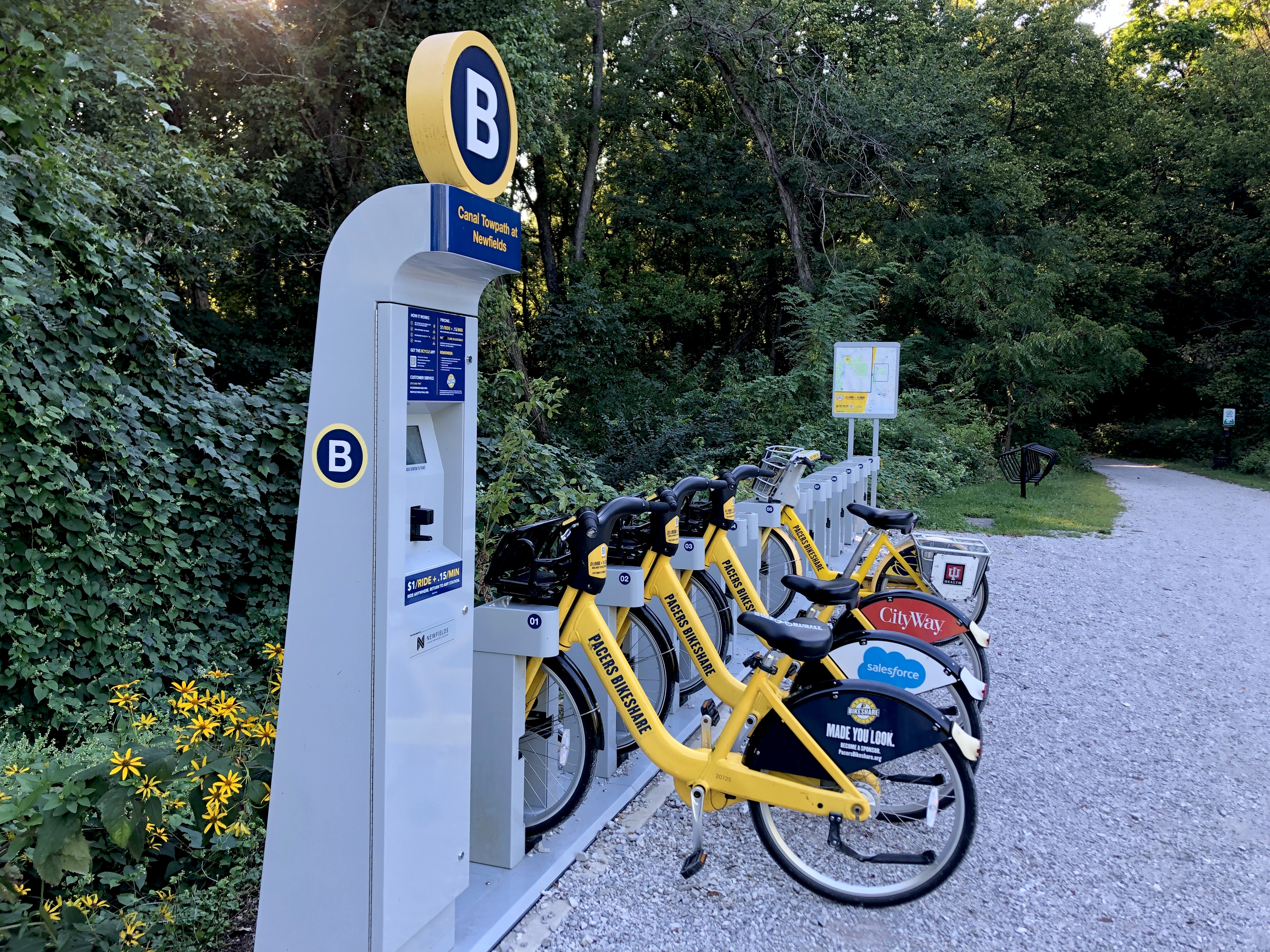
A payment kiosk and docking station at Newfields in 2022

Initially, bicycles could be accessed by purchasing either a 24-hour pass for $8 or an annual membership for $80. Passes provided riders with unlimited 30-minute trips, with trips lasting longer than 30 minutes incurring overage fees of $2 for 30-60 minutes and $4 for each additional 30 minutes. Since 2014, the system has offered a discounted membership option for people of limited means called EveryBody Rides. Until 2020, qualifying individuals were entitled to $10 annual memberships. Beginning February 1, 2020, the EveryBody Rides program transitioned to a monthly $5 pass with unlimited 60-minute trips.

In May 2019, Pacers Bikeshare introduced a new simplified pricing structure to remain competitive with the emergence of scooter-sharing systems in the city. The pay-as-you-ride model eliminated daily and monthly passes, allowing walk-up users to pay a $1 fee plus 15¢ per minute, regardless of ride duration. The $80 annual pass for unlimited trips of 30 minutes or less remained unchanged until February 1, 2020, when annual membership prices increased to $125 including unlimited 60-minute trips. As of 2023, annual passes had increased to $133.75.

The BCycle mobile app launched in April 2017, allowing users to view available bikes, reserve rides, and map routes from their smartphones.

== Promotions ==
Since 2016, Pacers Bikeshare has provided free service to users on September 22 in observance of International Car Free Day, promoted locally as "Car Free Day Indy".

Pacers Bikeshare, in partnership with the City of Indianapolis Office of Sustainability, promotes 30-minute free rides on Ozone Action Days (locally referred to as "Knozone Action Days") as an alternative transportation option to reduce ground level ozone during times of poor air quality.

To celebrate the system's expansion, Pacers Bikeshare suspended user fees on September 5-6, 2019. On Election Day, November 3, 2020, Pacers Bikeshare services were free to the public to encourage voter turnout. Over the years, corporate sponsors, such as UST and Indiana University Health, have subsidized the cost of free rides for limited periods of time as marketing opportunities.

Pacers Bikeshare also offered free service during the 2024 NBA All-Star Weekend and the 2025 WNBA All-Star Weekend.

== See also ==
- List of bicycle-sharing systems
- Transportation in Indianapolis
