= Graham E. Martin =

United States Navy officer

Graham E. Martin (January 18, 1919 – May 9, 2006) was an officer in the United States Navy and one of the Navy's "Golden Thirteen."

== Early life ==
Graham E. Martin was born January 18, 1919, in Tobacco City, Tennessee. He later moved to Indianapolis, Indiana, and graduated from Crispus Attucks High School as president of the June Senior Class of 1937. Martin earned his Bachelor of Arts in history from Indiana University in 1941 and a Master of Arts in history from Howard University.

== Military career ==
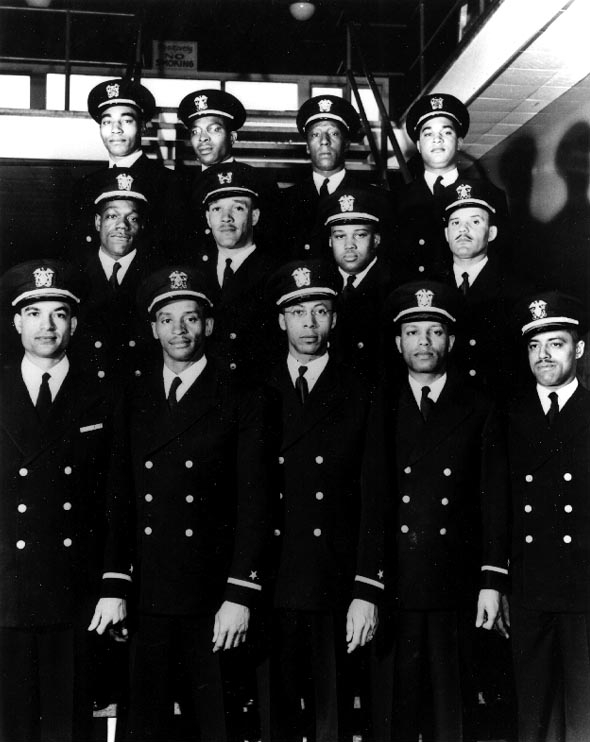
Golden Thirteen 1944. Graham E. Martin: middle row, first on the left.

Martin enlisted in the U.S. Naval Reserve on July 31, 1942. On March 1, 1944, the U.S. Naval Reserve commissioned him as an ensign and in July, he was assigned to the staff of Commander, Naval Local Defense Forces, Twelfth Naval District, in San Francisco, California.

By January 1944, there were nearly 1 million Black sailors in the U.S. Navy, but none were officers; this disparity caused public and civil rights leaders to pressure the Navy to commission a few black officers as well. Martin was one of 16 black enlisted men gathered in Illinois at the Great Lakes Training Station to begin an accelerated eight week training course. In March 1944, of these 16 men, twelve received commissions as ensigns, including Martin; the 13th made warrant officer (Charles B. Lear), and the three returned to enlisted duty. These 13 men would later become known as the "Golden Thirteen," however in 1944, they were treated more like pariahs than pioneers by Navy leadership.

In August 1945, the Navy promoted Martin to lieutenant (junior grade). In January 1946, he was stationed at Headquarters Ninth Naval District in Great Lakes, Illinois, where he remained until he was released from active duty on 27 June 1946. Martin was honorably discharged from the US Naval Reserve on April 21, 1959.

== Post-military career ==
In 1947, Martin and his wife Alma returned to Indianapolis, and Martin began teaching and coaching at his alma mater, Crispus Attucks High School. He coached baseball and served as head football coach from 1956 to 1971. In 1972, Martin began teaching evening classes until he ended his tenure at Crispus Attucks in 1982. Martin also served as a board member of the Crispus Attucks Athletic Association and remained a member after his retirement.

== Death and legacy ==
Graham E. Martin died on May 9, 2006, and was buried at Crown Hill Cemetery.

On August 17, 2011, the city of Indianapolis renamed the 67-acre Fall Creek and 16th Street Park the Lieutenant Junior Grade Graham Edward Martin Park in honor of Martin's memory and achievements.
