= Fall Creek (Indiana) =

Waterway in Indiana, United States

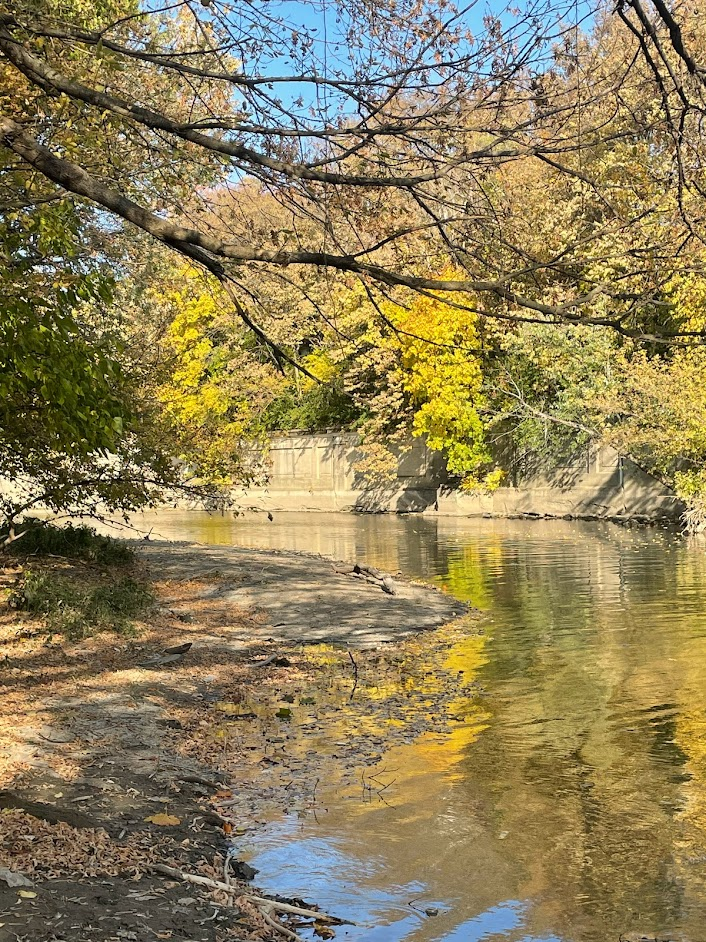
- Fall Creek in Indianapolis, Indiana

Location
- Country: United States
- State: Indiana

Physical characteristics
- Source
  - location: Honey Creek, Indiana
  - coordinates: 40°02′00.5″N 85°29′02.5″W
- Mouth: White River (Indiana)
- Length: 92.5 km (57.5 mi)

Fall Creek is a navigable in law waterway in the U.S. state of Indiana, and a tributary of the White River. It is 57.5 miles (92.5 km) long and has a watershed drainage area of 318 square miles (820 km^{2}) in central Indiana before flowing into the White River in Indianapolis. As it flows southwest, Fall Creek is the namesake of three townships in Indiana, in Henry County, Madison County, and then Hamilton County.

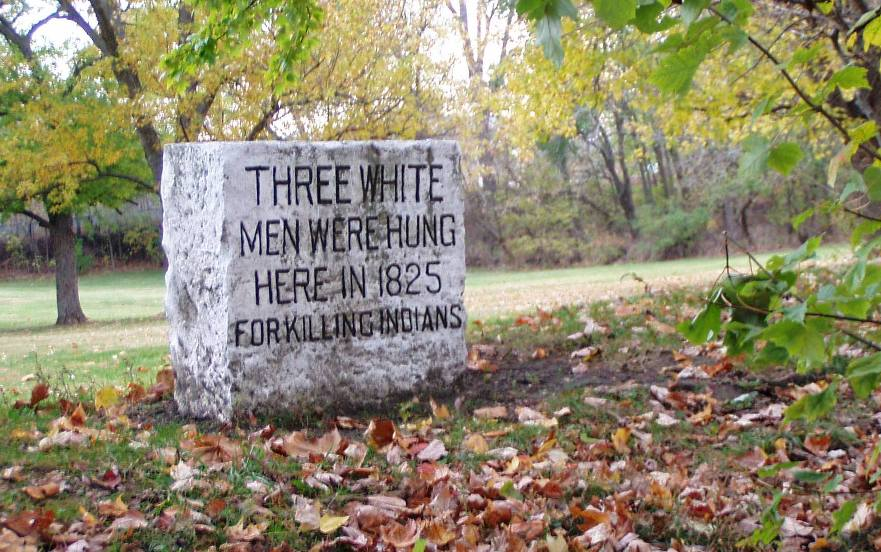
Marker of the executions for the Fall Creek Massacre, in Fall Creek Park, Pendleton, Indiana

Fall Creek begins near the town of Honey Creek, Indiana. Initially, it flows north, and crosses just into Delaware County, near Bell Creek, another tributary of the White River that joins the West Fork near Yorktown. Here, Fall Creek turns sharply to the southwest, crossing near Middletown. Tributaries in Henry County include Honey Creek and Sugar Creek.

In Madison County, Fall Creek joins with Sly Fork in Adams Township. In Pendleton, the creek joins Prairie Creek and forms the basis of the Fall Creek Park of 150 acres (610,000 m^{2}). Here, on January 12, 1825, the first execution of a white man for crimes against Native Americans in the United States was held when James Hudson was hanged for his role in the Fall Creek Massacre of 1824. Fall Creek was named for the waterfall near Pendleton. Three small waterfalls are found in succession at the park, and at points the creek becomes wide and shallow enough to nearly walk across. Fall Creek is then joined by Fosters Branch and Lick Creek.

Fall Creek is joined by Lick Creek just over the Hamilton County line. It crosses the southeast corner of Hamilton County through Geist Reservoir. The reservoir is created and maintained by a dam in Marion County. In Hamilton County, Fall Creek is joined by Flatfork Creek, Thorpe Creek, Thor Run, Mount Zion Branch, Bee Camp Creek, and Bills Branch.

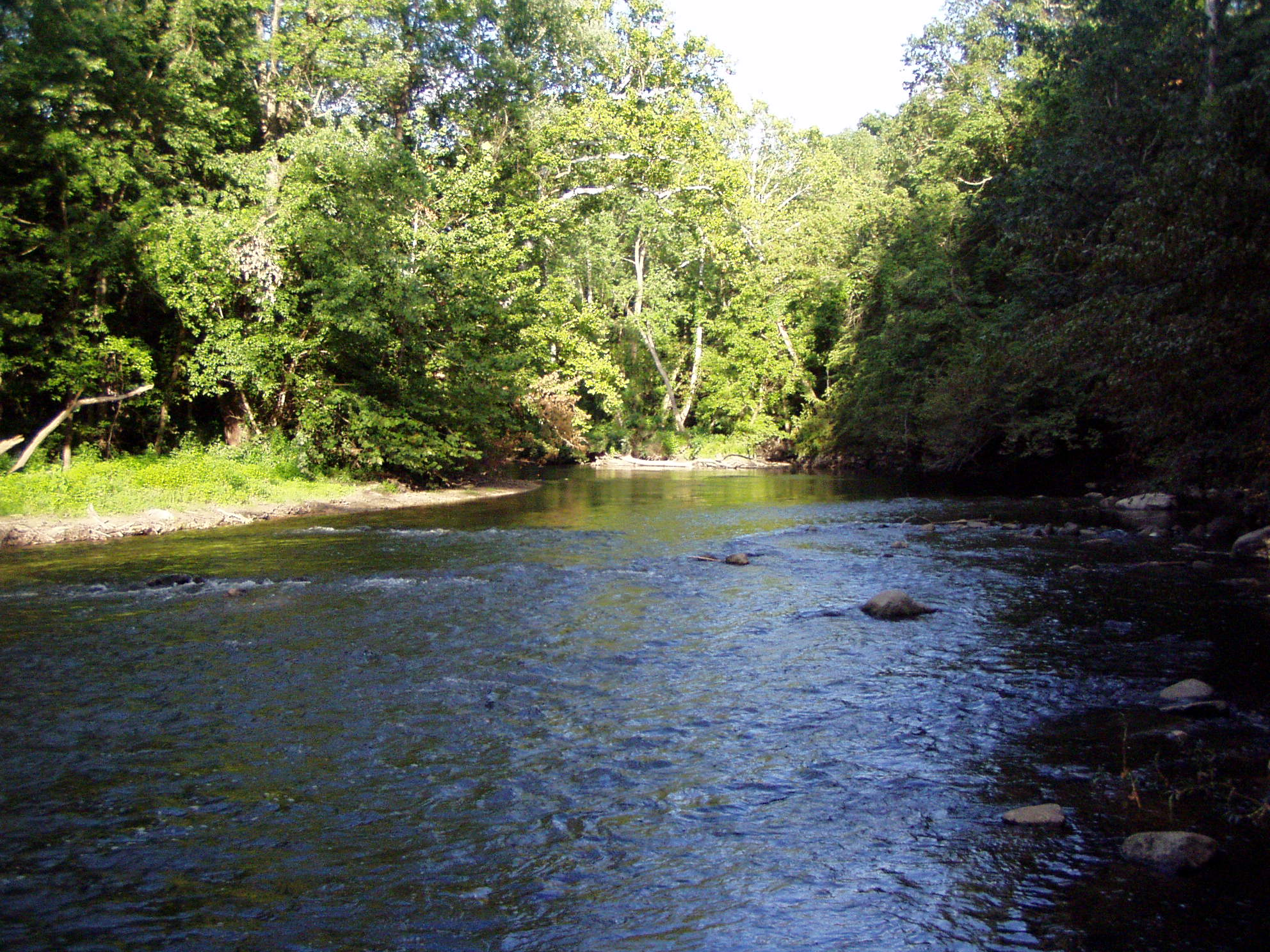
Fall Creek at Fort Harrison State Park

Below the reservoir, the creek continues, and flows through Fort Harrison State Park, where pedestrian nature trails follow the course of the creek. Beyond the park, a paved trail follows the creek through Indianapolis. Fall Creek is dammed again in Indianapolis, at Keystone Avenue (just downstream from where Binford Boulevard diverges from Fall Creek Parkway, North Drive at Allisonville Road). Near downtown Indianapolis, Fall Creek flows underneath an aqueduct for the Indiana Central Canal before emptying into the White River at 10th Street and White River Parkway, near the campus of Indiana University Indianapolis and across the street from the Veterans Administration hospital. Indianapolis is a planned city and was purposely located near the confluence of Fall Creek and the White River; Fall Creek provided water power for early industrial development in the city.

According to data from the United States Geological Survey station at 16th Street in Indianapolis, Indiana, the creek measures approximately 345 cubic feet per second (586 m^{3}/min).

Fall Creek was known in the Miami language as "ceenkwihtanki" and in the Delaware language as "Sokpehllak"

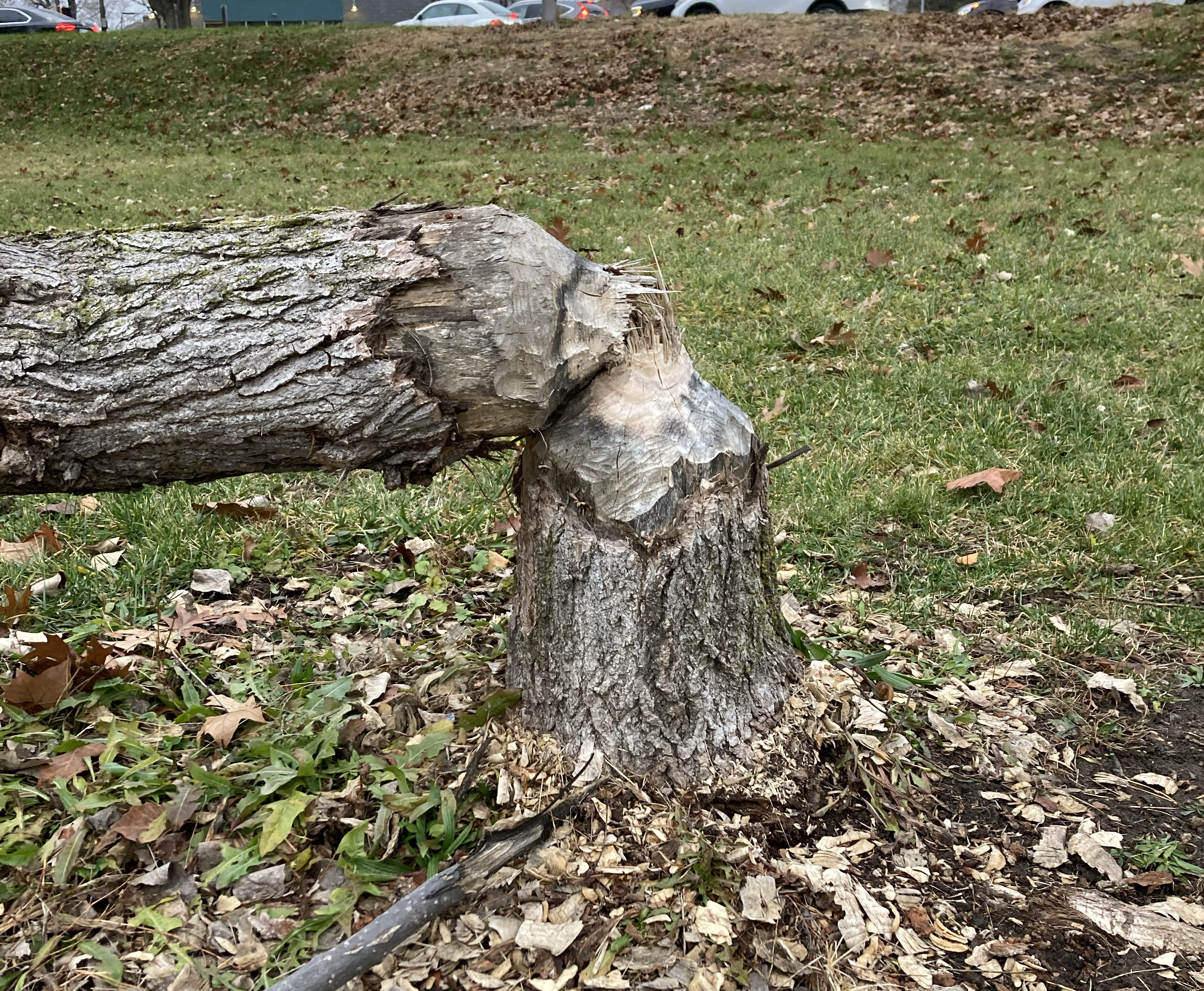
Signs of beaver activity along the Fall Creek Trail in Indianapolis, IN

== See also ==
- Fall Creek Greenway
- List of rivers of Indiana
