= List of Indiana state historical markers in Marion County =

Location of Marion County in Indiana

This is a list, as of November 2023, of the Indiana state historical markers in Marion County.

This is intended to be a complete list of the official state historical markers placed in Marion County, Indiana, United States by the Indiana Historical Bureau. The location of the historical markers and their latitude and longitude coordinates are included below when available, along with their names, years of placement, and topics as recorded by the Historical Bureau. There are 109 historical markers located in Marion County.

== Historical markers ==
Marker title	Image	Year placed	Location	City or Town	Topics
State Capitol		1946	East entrance to the Statehouse at N. Capitol Avenue and W. Market Street; 39°46′7″N 86°9′43″W	Indianapolis	Buildings and Architecture, Government Institutions, Politics
Anthony Wayne 1745–1796		1960	Front lawn of George Washington Community High School at 2215 W. Washington Street; 39°45′57″N 86°11′59″W	Indianapolis	Military, Early Settlement and Exploration
Sarah T. Bolton 1814–1893		1960	107 E. Sherman Drive, west of Sarah T. Bolton Park; 39°43′8″N 86°6′5.6″W	Beech Grove	Arts and Culture, Women
Lincoln to the Citizens of Indiana		1961	402 W. Washington Street at Missouri Street; 39°46′2.6″N 86°9′55.4″W	Indianapolis	Politics, Military
Toll House – Michigan Road		1961	4702 Michigan Road; 39°50′29.4″N 86°11′20.4″W	Indianapolis	Transportation, Business, Industry, and Labor
Camp Morton 1861–65		1962	1900 block of N. Alabama Street at the Herron-Morton Place Historic Park; 39°47′35″N 86°9′8″W	Indianapolis	Military
Brig. General Benjamin Harrison 1833–1901		1963	Benjamin Harrison Home at 1230 N. Delaware Street; 39°47′3″N 86°9′15″W	Indianapolis	Politics, Military
Civil War Arsenal 1861–1864		1964	East entrance to the Statehouse at N. Capitol Avenue and W. Market Street; 39°46′7.5″N 86°9′42.2″W	Indianapolis	Military
Home of Charles Warren Fairbanks House May 11, 1852 – June 4, 1918		1966	In the front lawn of a gated establishment at 30th and N. Meridian Streets; 39°48′35″N 86°9′25″W	Indianapolis	Politics
The Central Canal		1966	Intersection of N. Illinois Street and Westfield Boulevard; 39°51′18″N 86°9′36″W	Indianapolis	Transportation, Business, Industry, and Labor
Milestones in Nursing		1968	1001 W. 10th Street at the Nursing Museum entrance at Eskenazi Hospital; 39°46′48.3″N 86°10′33″W	Indianapolis	Women, Science, Medicine, and Inventions
Mary Bryan, Pioneer Woman		1975	Cemetery at Pine Street and Southport Road; 39°39′54.5″N 86°6′59″W	Southport	Women, Early Settlement and Exploration
Indianapolis Motor Speedway		1975	4790 W. 16th Street at the Indianapolis Motor Speedway Museum; 39°47′23″N 86°14′1″W	Speedway	Sports, Special Events, Science, Medicine, and Inventions
Former U.S. Arsenal		1976	Western edge of the Arsenal Technical High School campus 39°46′30″N 86°7′59″W	Indianapolis	Military
Crown Hill		1976	738 W. 38th Street in Crown Hill Cemetery, along the road between the chapel/crypt and the 38th Street overpass 39°49′32″N 86°10′22.6″W	Indianapolis	Cemetery
Woodruff Place		1976	On the median south of the fountain at Woodruff Cross Drive and Woodruff Middle Drive; 39°46′39″N 86°7′42.4″W	Indianapolis	Historic District, Neighborhoods, and Towns, Buildings and Architecture
The Indianapolis Times (no longer standing)		1979	300 block of W. Maryland Street at Capitol Avenue; 39°45′57″N 86°9′44″W	Indianapolis	Newspapers and Media
Ben Davis Railroad Station		1979	1155 S. High School Road at the entrance to Wayne Township Adult Education on the Ben Davis University High School campus	Indianapolis	Transportation
First Presbyterian Church of Southport		1983	6200 McFarland Road at Banta Road; 39°40′23″N 86°6′40″W	Southport	Religion
William Forsyth 1854–1935		1984	Brown's Corner Park at N. Emerson Avenue and E. Washington Street; 39°46′13″N 86°5′3″W	Indianapolis	Arts and Culture
Macedonian Tribune		1990	Southeastern corner of West and Washington streets 39°46′1.4″N 86°10′0.4″W	Indianapolis	Newspapers and Media, Immigration and Ethnic Groups
North Meridian Street Historic District		1991	Westfield Boulevard and N. Meridian Street; 39°51′28″N 86°9′26.5″W	Indianapolis	Historic District, Neighborhoods, and Towns
North Meridian Street Historic District		1991	40th Street and N. Meridian Street; 39°49′45″N 86°9′24.6″W	Indianapolis	Historic District, Neighborhoods, and Towns
Crispus Attucks High School		1992	1140 Dr. Martin Luther King Jr. Street; 39°46′58″N 86°10′7″W	Indianapolis	African American, Education, Buildings and Architecture
North Western Christian University		1992	1325 N. College Avenue, on the eastern side of the street north of the Interstate 65 overpass 39°47′5.6″N 86°8′40.4″W	Indianapolis	Education, Religion
Site of Golden Hill Totem Pole		1992	Totem Lane in the Golden Hill neighborhood 39°49′6″N 86°11′6″W	Indianapolis	Arts and Culture, American Indian/Native American
Site of the Central Canal		1992	At the Central Canal, behind the North State Office Building at 100 N. Senate Avenue; 39°46′10″N 86°9′56″W	Indianapolis	Transportation, Business, Industry, and Labor
Ransom Place Historic District		1993	830 Dr. Martin Luther King Jr. Street; 39°46′50″N 86°10′6″W	Indianapolis	Historic District, Neighborhoods, and Towns, African American
Willard Park		1993	Willard Park at 1901 E. Washington Street; 39°46′2″N 86°7′42″W	Indianapolis	Education
Indiana School for the Blind		1994	Northern side of the entrance for 7725 N. College Avenue; 39°53′41″N 86°8′39″W	Indianapolis	Education, Government Institutions
Indiana Avenue		1994	On a traffic island at the southeastern corner of West Street and Indiana Avenue; 39°46′31″N 86°9′59.32″W	Indianapolis	African American, Historic District, Neighborhoods, and Towns
Bulgarian Orthodox Church		1995	226 N. Blackford Street, Indiana University Indianapolis campus 39°46′16.6″N 86°10′13″W	Indianapolis	Religion, Immigration and Ethnic Groups
Joseph W. Summers Memorial Bridge		1995	Eastern side of N. Meridian Street on the southeastern corner of its bridge over Fall Creek; 39°48′11″N 86°9′23.4″W	Indianapolis	Transportation, Buildings and Architecture, Politics
Joseph W. Summers Memorial Bridge		1995	Western side of N. Meridian Street on the northwestern corner of its bridge over Fall Creek; 39°48′13″N 86°9′24.3″W	Indianapolis	Transportation, Buildings and Architecture
The Old Northside		1995	1456 Central Avenue; 39°47′13″N 86°8′58.4″W	Indianapolis	Historic District, Neighborhoods, and Towns, Buildings and Architecture
The Old Northside		1995	12th and N. Delaware Streets; 39°46′59″N 86°9′15″W	Indianapolis	Historic District, Neighborhoods, and Towns, Buildings and Architecture
Fort Benjamin Harrison		1996	Otis Avenue between Hess and Lawton Roads; 39°51′26″N 86°0′57.2″W	Lawrence	Military, Historic District, Neighborhoods, and Towns
Bates-Hendricks House		1996	1526 S. New Jersey Street along the median north of Lincoln Street; 39°44′46.5″N 86°9′2″W	Indianapolis	Buildings and Architecture, Politics
Indiana Federation of Colored Women's Clubs		1997	2034 N. Capitol Avenue; 39°47′38.6″N 86°9′42″W	Indianapolis	African American, Women
Romanian Orthodox Church		1998	White River State Park at the northeastern corner of the Blackford Street bridge over the Central Canal; 39°46′10″N 86°10′12″W	Indianapolis	Immigration and Ethnic Groups, Religion
Lockerbie Square		1998	Lockerbie Street and N. East Street; 39°46′19.4″N 86°8′55.4″W	Indianapolis	Historic District, Neighborhoods, and Towns, Buildings and Architecture
German Greenhouses and Truck Gardens		1998	Bluff Park, at Bluff Road and Hanna Avenue; 39°42′26″N 86°10′12″W	Indianapolis	Immigration and Ethnic Groups, Nature and Natural Disasters, Business, Industry, and Labor, Agriculture
Indianapolis Fire Department / Bowen-Merrill Fire		1999	2 W. Washington Street; 39°46′2″N 86°9′31.5″W	Indianapolis	Government Institutions, Nature and Natural Disasters
Athenaeum		1999	401 E. Michigan Street; 39°46′25″N 86°9′0″W	Indianapolis	Immigration and Ethnic Groups, Buildings and Architecture
Market Street Temple		1999	435 E. Market Street; 39°46′5.6″N 86°8′59″W	Indianapolis	Religion, Immigration and Ethnic Groups
Holy Rosary–Danish Church Historic District		2000	Southeastern corner of S. East Street and S. Stevens Street; 39°45′28″N 86°8′57.4″W	Indianapolis	Immigration and Ethnic Groups, Historic District, Neighborhoods, and Towns
Widows and Orphans Friends' Society		2003	Eastern side of Capitol Avenue, ½ block south of 14th Street; 39°47′8.4″N 86°9′40″W	Indianapolis	Women
Greek Orthodox Church		2003	West Street beside the Indiana Historical Society at 450 W. Ohio Street; 39°46′14″N 86°10′0″W	Indianapolis	Religion, Immigration and Ethnic Groups
Brookville Road		2004	10622 Brookville Road; 39°44′22.4″N 85°58′41″W	Indianapolis	Transportation, Business, Industry, and Labor
John Muir in Indianapolis		2004	On a grassy triangle at the former site of Osgood, Smith & Co. near the junction of Illinois and Merrill Streets; 39°45′31.5″N 86°9′36.6″W	Indianapolis	Nature and Natural Disasters, Politics
Marion County Girl Scouts		2004	Irvington Presbyterian Church at 55 Johnson Avenue; 39°46′9″N 86°4′19″W	Indianapolis	Women, Arts and Culture
Zerelda G. Wallace		2004	Central Christian Church at 701 N. Delaware Street; 39°46′37″N 86°9′13″W	Indianapolis	Women, Religion
28th Regiment USCT		2004	Virginia Avenue and McCarty Street; 39°45′26″N 86°8′42″W	Indianapolis	African American, Military
Robert F. Kennedy Speech on Death of Martin L. King		2005	King Park at 17th Street and Broadway Street; 39°47′25.4″N 86°8′45.6″W	Indianapolis	Politics, African American
Calvin Fletcher		2006	Virginia Avenue and East Street; 39°45′39″N 86°8′57″W	Indianapolis	Historic District, Neighborhoods, and Towns, African American, Military
John Freeman		2006	Next to the Indiana Landmarks Center, on the western side of N. Pennsylvania Street between 10th and 11th Streets; 39°41′54″N 86°9′21″W	Indianapolis	Underground Railroad, African American, Government Institutions
1907 Indiana Eugenics Law		2007	Eastern lawn of the Indiana State Library at 140 N. Senate Avenue; 39°46′11″N 86°9′49″W	Indianapolis	Science, Medicine, and Inventions, Legal
Ovid Butler Sr.		2007	1306 N. Park Avenue; 39°47′4″N 86°8′52″W	Indianapolis	Education, Newspapers and Media
St. Vincent's Infirmary		2007	536 E. Vermont Street; 39°46′22.6″N 86°8′52″W	Indianapolis	Medicine
The Lincoln Funeral Train		2009	South lawn of the Indiana Statehouse at 200 W. Washington Street; 39°46′3″N 86°9′46″W	Indianapolis	Government Institutions, Politics, Special Events
Bethel African Methodist Episcopal Church		2009	414 W. Vermont Street; 39°46′23″N 86°9′57″W	Indianapolis	African American, Buildings & Architecture, Education & Libraries, Military, Religion, Underground Railroad
Marshall "Major" Taylor		2009	E. 38th Street at the Monon Trail, across from the Indiana State Fairgrounds; 39°49′31″N 86°8′23″W	Indianapolis	African American, Sports
Indianapolis Propylaeum		2009	In front of the Propylaeum at 1410 N. Delaware Street; 39°47′11″N 86°9′16″W	Indianapolis	Women, Buildings & Architecture, Arts & Culture
Isaac Blackford		2011	Northeast corner of Blackford and W. New York streets 39°46′18″N 86°10′12″W	Indianapolis	
Washington Park Baseball		2011	1200 W. Washington Street; 39°45′58″N 86°10′55″W	Indianapolis	
St. Vincent's Hospital		2013	Illinois-Fall Creek Center, 2535 N. Capitol Avenue; 39°48′12″N 86°9′36″W	Indianapolis	
Indianapolis Times		2013	Hudnut Commons between W. Maryland and W. Washington Streets; 39°45′58″N 86°9′46″W	Indianapolis	
Allison Machine Shop		2015	1200 W. Main Street; 39°47′0″N 86°14′28″W	Speedway	Business, Industry, & Labor; Military
T. C. Steele Studio and Herron		2015	110 E. 16th Street outside Herron High School; 39°47′19″N 86°9′19″W	Indianapolis	
James Overall		2016	Near 524 N. West Street between Indiana Avenue and Michigan Street; 39°46′31″N 86°10′1″W	Indianapolis	African American, Underground Railroad, Law & Court Case, Religion
Senate Avenue YMCA		2016	420 N. Senate Ave., at the southwest corner of Michigan Street and Senate Avenue; 39°46′27″N 86°9′48″W	Indianapolis	African American, Education, Buildings & Architecture
Central State Hospital		2016	Central State Mansion at 202 Steeples Boulevard; 39°46′3″N 86°12′41″W	Indianapolis	Science, Medicine, Invention, Education
Little Sisters of the Poor		2017	520 E. Vermont Street; 39°46′23″N 86°8′54″W	Indianapolis	Women, Religion
German Newspapers' Demise		2017	41 S. Delaware Street (immediately south of the Julia M. Carson Transit Center at 201 E. Washington Street); 39°45′58″N 86°9′16″W	Indianapolis	
"Cannon Ball" Baker		2017	902 E. Garfield Drive; 39°44′1″N 86°8′40″W	Indianapolis	
First Lady Caroline Harrison		2017	Benjamin Harrison Presidential Site, 1230 N. Delaware Street; 39°47′2″N 86°9′15″W	Indianapolis	Women, Politics, Arts and Culture
James Whitcomb Riley Home		2018	528 Lockerbie Street; 39°46′19″N 86°8′52″W	Indianapolis	Arts and Culture; Buildings & Architecture
WWI Aviation Repair Depot		2018	1182 N. Main Street, near Gilman Street; 39°46′59″N 86°14′28″W	Speedway	Business, Industry, & Labor; Military; Science, Medicine, & Invention; Transportation
Lincoln Hospital, 1909–ca. 1915		2018	1109 N. Senate Avenue; 39°46′56″N 86°9′46″W	Indianapolis	
Romanian Orthodox Church		2019	White River State Park at the northeast corner of the Central Canal and N. Blackford Street bridge 39°46′9″N 86°10′12″W	Indianapolis	Religion, Immigration and Ethnic Group
May Wright Sewall 1844–1920		2019	Northwest corner of Veterans Memorial Plaza at the corner of N. Meridian and North streets 39°46′31″N 86°9′25″W	Indianapolis	
Lt. Col. Joseph H. Ward, M.D 1872–1952		2019	W. 21st Street and Boulevard Place; 39°47′42″N 86°9′47″W	Indianapolis	
Pathological Department / Old Pathology Building		2019	3045 W. Vermont Street; 39°46′11″N 86°12′47″W	Indianapolis	Science, Medicine, and Technology
Willard Park		2019	1901 E. Washington Street; 39°46′2″N 86°7′44″W	Indianapolis	
The American Legion		2020	777 N. Meridian Street; 39°46′38″N 86°9′27″W	Indianapolis	Military
Grace Julian Clarke 1865–1938		2020	115 S. Audubon Road; 39°46′7″N 86°4′12″W	Indianapolis	Women, Politics
Greek Orthodox Church		2020	West Street beside the Indiana Historical Society, 450 W. Ohio Street; 39°46′16″N 86°10′0″W	Indianapolis	Religion, Immigration and Ethnic Group
Meredith Nicholson 1866–1947		2020	1500 N. Delaware Street; 39°47′14″N 86°9′14″W	Indianapolis	Literature, Arts & Culture
Booth Tarkington 1866–1947		2019 (dedicated in 2020)	4270 N. Meridian Street; 39°49′58″N 86°9′25″W	Indianapolis	Literature, Arts & Culture
Rep. Roberta West Nicholson 1903–1987		2021	English Foundation Building at 615 N. Alabama Street; 39°46′32″N 86°9′7″W	Indianapolis	Political, Women
Newby Oval		2021	Fall Creek Trail near E. 31st Street; 39°48′43″N 86°8′36″W	Indianapolis	Sports
Harriette Bailey Conn 1922–1981		2021	1 N. Capitol Avenue; 39°46′2″N 86°9′41″W	Indianapolis	African American, Women, Politics
Origins of Indiana Pride / Indiana LGBTQ Pride		2021	40 Monument Circle; 39°46′5″N 86°9′31″W	Indianapolis	
Leedy Manufacturing Company		2021	1601 S. Barth Avenue; 39°49′46″N 86°8′27″W	Indianapolis	Business, Industry, and Labor; Arts and Culture; Invention
Indiana Woman's Suffrage		2021	200 West Washington Street; 39°46′6″N 86°9′42″W	Indianapolis	Political; Women
Dr. Amelia Keller 1871–1943		2022	988 W. Walnut Street; 39°46′38″N 86°10′34″W	Indianapolis	Science, Medicine, & Invention; Women; Political
John Hope School No. 26		2022	1301 E. 16th Street; 39°47′18″N 86°8′11″W	Indianapolis	Education & Library; African American
Sigma Gamma Rho		2022	5350 E. University Avenue; 39°4′56″N 86°4′34″W	Indianapolis	African American, Education
Hook's Drug Stores		2022	1101 S. East Street; 39°45′7″N 86°8′58″W	Indianapolis	Science, Medicine & Invention, Business; Business & Industry; African American; Historic District/Town
Felrath Hines Jr.		2023	1140 Dr. Martin Luther King Jr. Street; 39°46′58″N 86°10′6″W	Indianapolis	Arts & Culture; African American
Janet Flanner 1892–1978		2023	4061 N. Illinois Street; 39°49′48″N 86°9′31″W	Indianapolis	Newspaper & Media; Women; Arts & Culture
Andrew "Bo" Foster		2023	2160 N. Illinois Street; 39°47′47″N 86°9′33″W	Indianapolis	Business, Industry, & Labor; African American
Hinkle Fieldhouse		2023	510 W. 49th Street; 39°50′33″N 86°10′4″W	Indianapolis	Sports; Buildings & Architecture; Education & Library
Lynching of John Tucker		2023	110 W. Washington Street; 39°46′1″N 86°9′36″W	Indianapolis	African American; Law & Court
The Syrian Quarter		2023	500 S. Capitol Avenue; 39°45′25″N 86°9′43″W	Indianapolis	Immigration & Ethnic Group; Arts & Culture
South Side Turnverein		2023	306 Prospect Street; 39°45′9″N 86°9′11″W	Indianapolis	Sports; Buildings & Architecture; Immigration & Ethnic Group
John Leslie “Wes” Montgomery 1923–1968		2023	Northwest corner of E. 10th St. and Bellafontaine St.	Indianapolis	Arts & Culture; African American

== See also ==
- List of Indiana state historical markers
- National Register of Historic Places listings in Marion County, Indiana
