= Indiana 9/11 Memorial =

Memorial in Indianapolis, Indiana, US

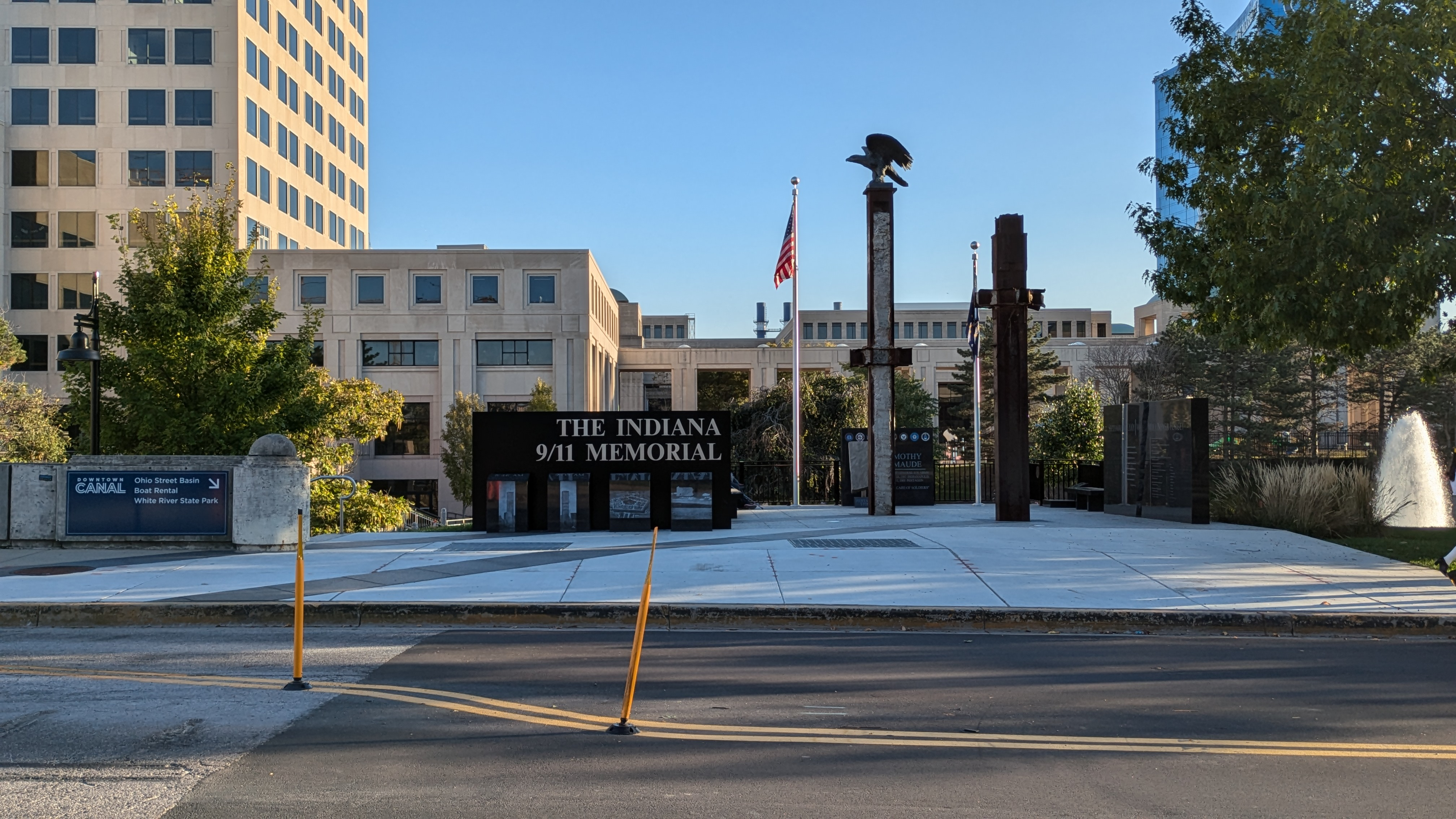
- Location: 421 West Ohio Street; Indianapolis, Indiana
- Coordinates: 39.7700°N 86.1659°W
- Material: Steel and granite
- Opening date: September 11, 2011
- Dedicated to: Victims of the September 11 attacks
- Website: indiana911memorial.org

Indiana 9/11 Memorial is a memorial in downtown Indianapolis dedicated to those killed in the September 11 attacks. It was begun early in 2010 as a grassroots effort. Greg Hess, a firefighter paramedic with the Indianapolis Fire Department, was the primary lead of the initiative. In 2001, Hess was a member of Indiana Task Force 1 (INTF-1), one of the first FEMA Search and Rescue teams to arrive at Ground Zero. INTF-1 spent 8 days in New York assisting the local agencies in the rescue and recovery efforts.

The Indiana 9/11 Memorial is located at 421 West Ohio Street, next to Indianapolis Fire Station 13 along the Indiana Central Canal. It is a part of a city landscape that includes the USS Indianapolis Memorial and the Medal of Honor Memorial. The focal point of the memorial consists of two 11,000-pound (5,000 kg) beams from the Twin Towers. Behind the beams stand a pair of six-foot tall black granite walls inscribed with remembrances of the events in New York City; Washington, D.C.; and Shanksville, Pennsylvania. Perched atop one of the beams is a bronze, life-size sculpture of an American bald eagle, with wings outstretched and gazing east toward New York City.

In 2010, Hess petitioned the Port Authority of New York and New Jersey to obtain the steel beams from JFK Airport Hangar 17, which housed all the artifacts recovered from the World Trade Center. Over 11,000 motorcyclists escorted a semi truck carrying the memorial beams to Indianapolis, a procession that was estimated at over 47 miles (76 km) in length.

== See also ==
- Memorials and services for the September 11 attacks
