= Golden Hill Historic District =

Golden Hill Historic District may refer to:

- Golden Hill Historic District (Bridgeport, Connecticut), listed on the National Register of Historic Places in Fairfield County, Connecticut
- Golden Hill Historic District (Indianapolis, Indiana), listed on the National Register of Historic Places in Marion County, Indiana
