= John Wesley McCormick =

John Wesley McCormick Sr. (August 30, 1754 – April 18, 1837) was a nineteenth-century settler in Indiana. He was one of the first white settlers in the future Indianapolis area. McCormick's Creek State Park, near Spencer, Indiana, is named after him.

== History ==
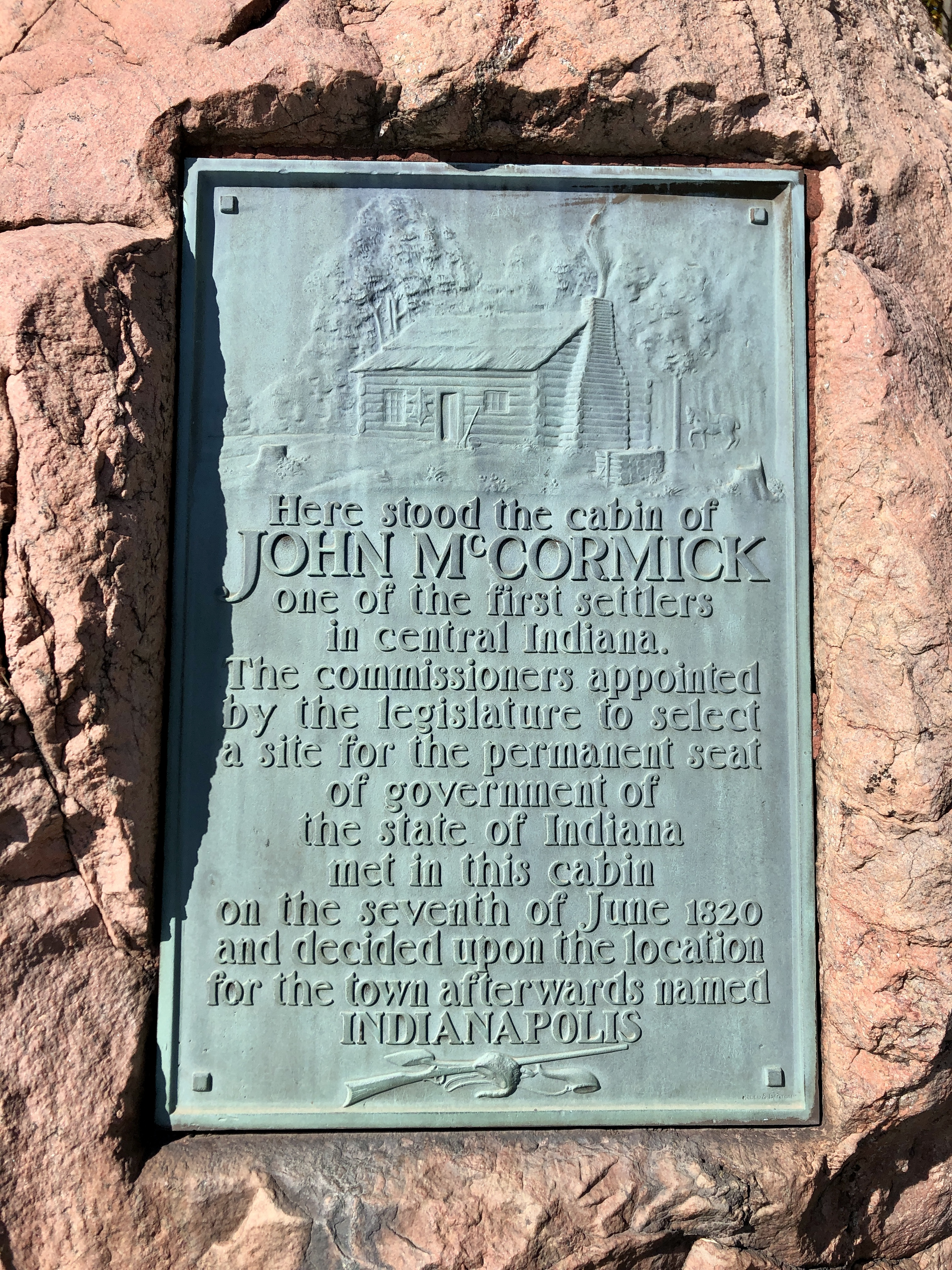
Plaque at the McCormick Cabin Site in Indianapolis

John Wesley McCormick was born near Winchester, Virginia, on August 30, 1754. He served in the American Revolutionary War from 1776 to 1783, his first enlistment being with Captain James Robinson's Company in Col. Church's regiment, He enlisted in January 1778 in Captain James Shelley's Company and afterward served in Captain Mark's Company of the 14th Virginia Regiment, then with the same company in the 10th Virginia Regiment under Col. Charles Lewis. His last enlistment was from Pennsylvania for three months of service.

Part of his service was against the Native Americans on the frontier, where he engaged in a fight on the Watauga River. His residence at the time of his first enlistment was Molachucky River, Virginia, now a part of Tennessee. With the expiration of his second enlistment in 1780 he moved to Bedford, Pennsylvania, where on March 24, he married Catherine Drennen (born January 25, 1769, in Pennsylvania). In 1808, the McCormicks moved to Ohio, settling in Preble County not far from Eaton. The overland trip was made in wagons, then down the Ohio River in flatboats.

They remained in Ohio only a short time before moving to the Indiana Territory, accompanied by John's two brothers (Samuel and James) and their families. They lived initially at the fort at Connersville because of trouble with the Indians, but John was the first man to leave the protection of the defense to look for permanent settlement. In 1816, he settled nearly 100 acres (0.40 km^{2}) along a canyon by waterfalls in what later became Owen County, in the area of what is now McCormick's Creek State Park. On December 11, 1816, Indiana became the nineteenth state admitted into the union.

John Wesley McCormick Jr., John's son, built the first white settlement in Indianapolis in 1820, a log cabin on the east bank of the White River, where he lived with his wife Bethia Case McCormick and their eight children. John Jr. also built a tavern where a meeting was held in June 1820 to decide the location of the capital of the new state of Indiana. In 1822, he became one of the first county commissioners of Indiana, and in 1825, the state capital was moved from Corydon to Indianapolis.

John died on April 18, 1837, aged 83, and Catherine died on February 22, 1862, aged 93. The site of the John McCormick Jr. log cabin is today marked with a boulder and plaque in White River State Park, and a student residence at nearby Indiana University Purdue University Indianapolis (IUPUI) is named for him. The McCormick Cabin Site was listed on the National Register of Historic Places in 1981.
