= Indianapolis Chair Manufacturing Company =

- Formerly listed on the U.S. National Register of Historic Places
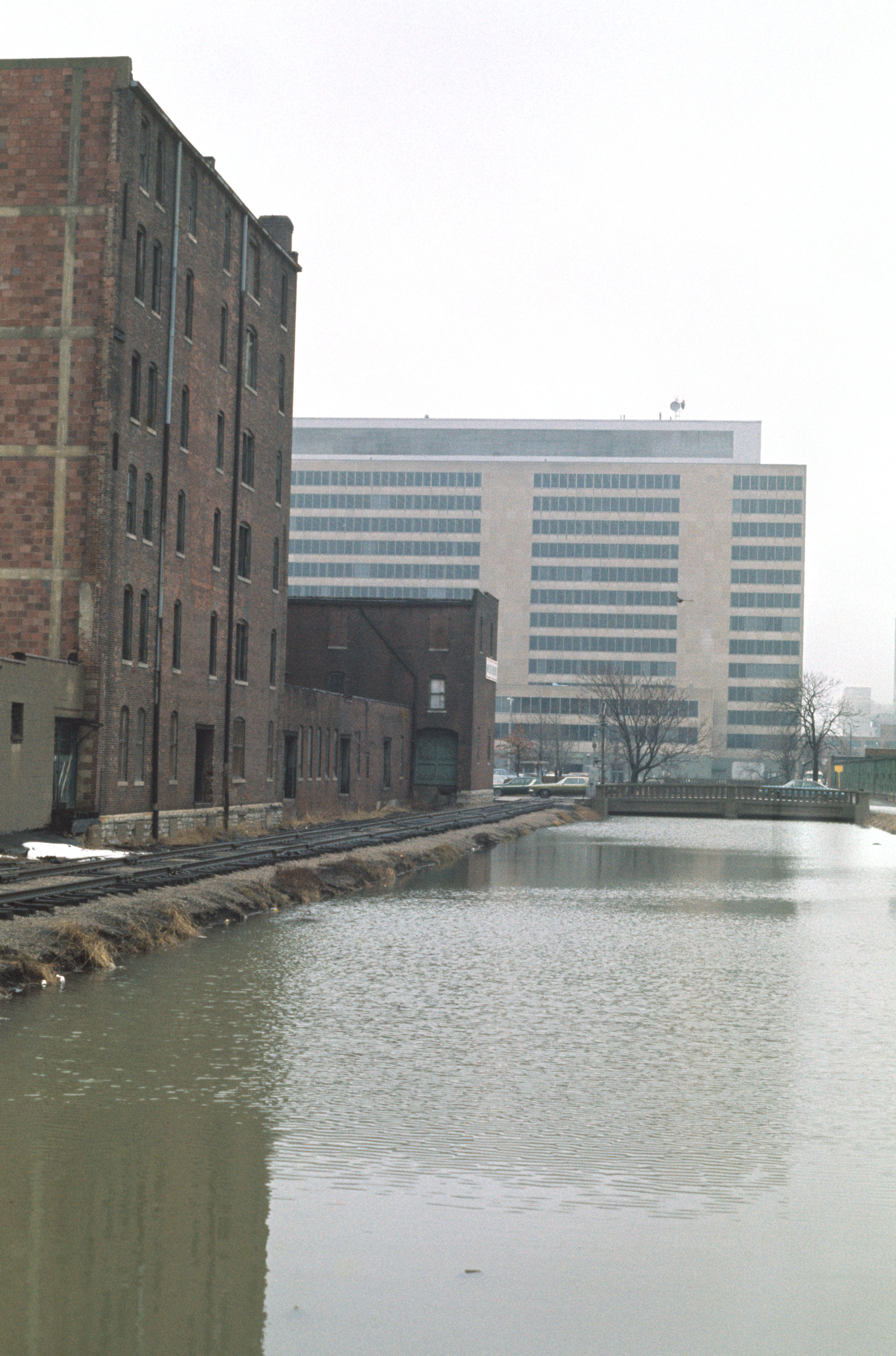
- Indianapolis Warehouse (left) and the Indiana Central Canal

- Location within Indianapolis Location within Indianapolis Location within Indiana Location within the United States
- Location: 330 W. New York St., Indianapolis, Indiana
- Coordinates: 39°46′18″N 86°9′52″W
- Area: 1.1 acres (0.45 ha)
- Built: 1891-1893
- NRHP reference No.: 84000361

Significant dates
- Added to NRHP: November 23, 1984
- Removed from NRHP: July 16, 1986

Indianapolis Chair Manufacturing Company, also known as the Indianapolis Warehouse, was a historic factory complex located in Indianapolis, Indiana, U.S. It was between built 1891 and 1893, and consisted of three sections. It included two large six-story brick sections with segmental arched windows and an eight-story corner tower. It was demolished in 1986 and replaced by a Residence Inn by Marriott-branded hotel.

It was listed on the National Register of Historic Places in 1984 and delisted in 1986.

== See also ==
- National Register of Historic Places listings in Center Township, Marion County, Indiana
