= Indiana Tower =

Unbuilt observation tower in Indiana, U.S.

- Indiana Tower, proposed centerpiece of White River State Park

General information
- Status: Never built
- Type: Observation Tower
- Location: Indianapolis, Indiana, United States
- Coordinates: 39.767406°N 86.172033°W
- Owner: State of Indiana

Height
- Roof: 750 ft (230 m)

Design and construction
- Architect: César Pelli

Indiana Tower was the proposed centerpiece of White River State Park in Indianapolis, Indiana, United States. Designed by César Pelli in 1980, the plan was ultimately scrapped.

== Proposal ==
As part of the downtown revitalization campaign for Indianapolis, the state solicited designs for a distinctive piece of skyline architecture in the tradition of the Gateway Arch in St. Louis or the Space Needle in Seattle. The Pelli tower was to be located in the new Indiana Landing area of Indianapolis (which later became White River State Park). The Pelli design called for an obelisk 750 feet (230 m) tall, with a diameter of 130 feet (40 m) at the base and 64 feet (20 m) at the peak that would "establish the Crossroads of America". The tower would have had a 1.75 mile (2.82km) spiral walkway to the top with a history of Indiana etched into the limestone along it, offering a panoramic observation deck for visitors. As such, the design would have been taller than the Arch, the Washington Monument, and the Statue of Liberty. The proposed $25 million included the rerouting of West Washington Street to the south so that the tower could be placed on the east bank of the White River where the street had crossed the river. Heavy criticism was directed at the plan by local architects and laymen alike. Pelli argued his tower was misunderstood and pointed to arguments preceding the construction of other monuments such as the Eiffel Tower to illustrate the relative ease with which unbuilt monuments are attacked. The project never progressed as both the state and private donors refused to offer funding.
