= West Washington Street Pumping Station =

Historic former pumping station in Indianapolis, Indiana, U.S.

- U.S. National Register of Historic Places
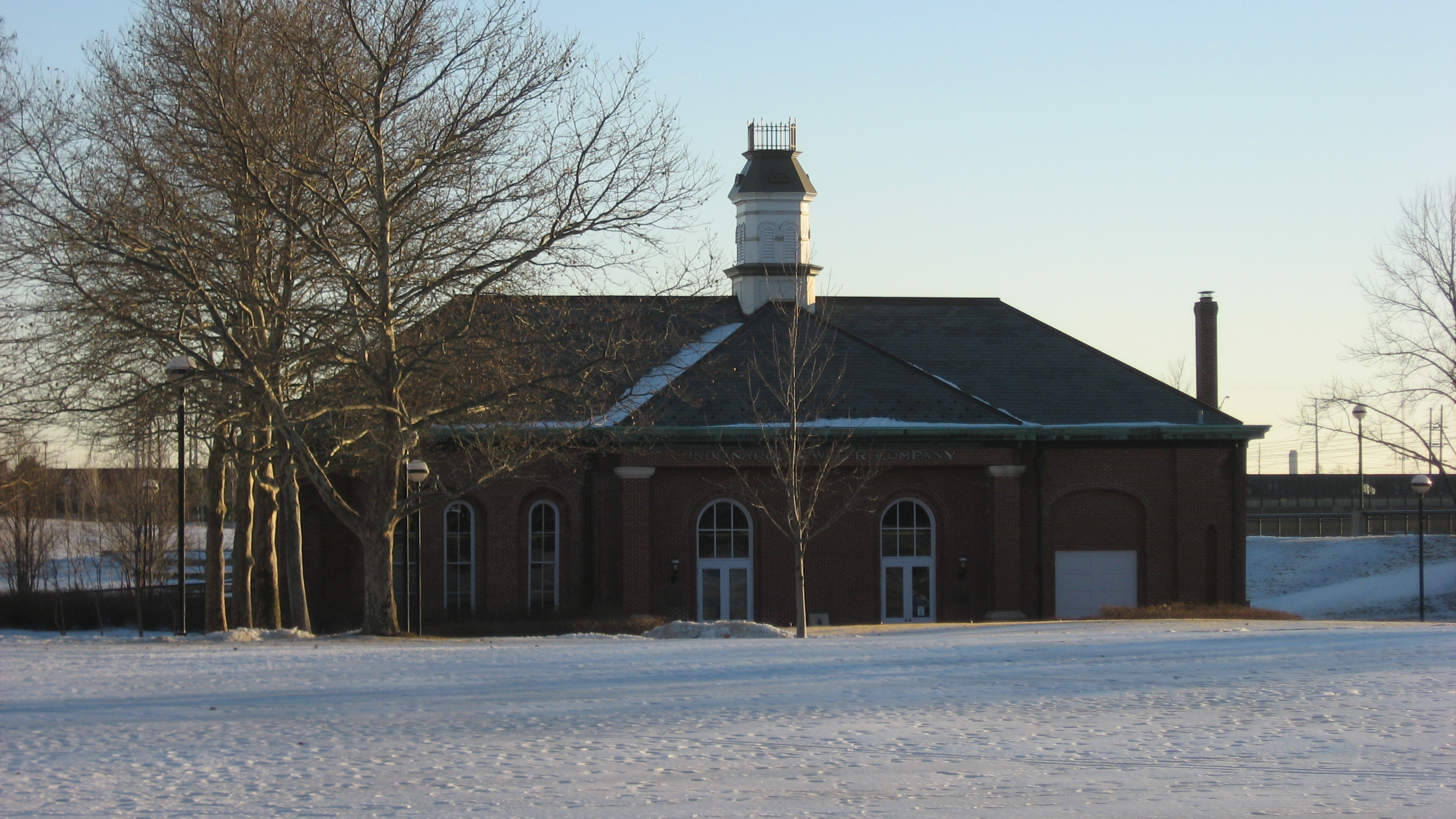
- West Washington Street Pumping Station, February 2011

- Location within Indianapolis Location within Indianapolis Location within Indiana Location within the United States
- Location: 801 W. Washington St., Indianapolis, Indiana
- Coordinates: 39°46′0″N 86°10′19″W
- Area: 1.8 acres (0.73 ha)
- Built: 1870-1871
- NRHP reference No.: 80000063
- Added to NRHP: July 17, 1980

West Washington Street Pumping Station is a historic pumping station located in Indianapolis, Indiana. It was built in 1870, and is a one-story, rectangular brick building. It was modified to its present form after 1909, and is 2/3 of its original size. It has a slate hipped roof topped by a square central tower and features distinctive brick detailing, and arched openings. The building served as the city's only water pumping station until 1890.

It was listed on the National Register of Historic Places in 1980. It currently houses the park offices of White River State Park.

== History ==
In 1870, the Water Works Company of Indianapolis was founded to supply drinking water and pressurized water for fire protection by James O. Woodruff, who later in the 1870s would develop the suburb of Woodruff Place. Construction of the pumping station began that year and it opened in 1871. The station, located on West Washington Street at the Indiana Central Canal, used the canal to power water wheels to pump water into the water system.

The Water Works Company failed to attract enough customers and its assets, including the pumphouse, were sold at a sheriff's sale to the newly-formed Indianapolis Water Company in 1881. The pumphouse was the only one in the system until 1890, when the company opened the Riverside station.

In 1908, the company installed hydraulic turbines connected to three centrifugal pumps to improve efficiency while continuing to use the canal as the power source. Each of the pumps had a capacity of 4,500,000 US gallons (17,000,000 L; 3,700,000 imp gal) per day.

The building originally had three wings forming a T. A tornado in 1930 damaged one wing and it was removed, resulting in the structure's current rectangular form. The building's cupola was also damaged and removed.

The pumphouse continued in use until 1969. In 1976, the water company gave the building and surrounding property to the city of Indianapolis. With the development of White River State Park starting, it was decided in 1979 to locate the park offices and visitor center in the pumphouse. The city sold the pumphouse to the White River Park Development Commission in 1980 and renovations, including reconstruction of the cupola, began soon thereafter. On July 9, 1980, the pumphouse was added to the National Register of Historic Places, and on August 31, 1981, the commission moved into its offices there. The visitor center was also opened there, but was later moved to a new building. The American Water Works Association designated the pumphouse as an American/Canadian/Mexican Water Landmark in 1982.

== See also ==
- National Register of Historic Places listings in Center Township, Marion County, Indiana
