= McCormick Cabin Site =

Historic site in Indianapolis, Indiana, U.S.

- U.S. National Register of Historic Places
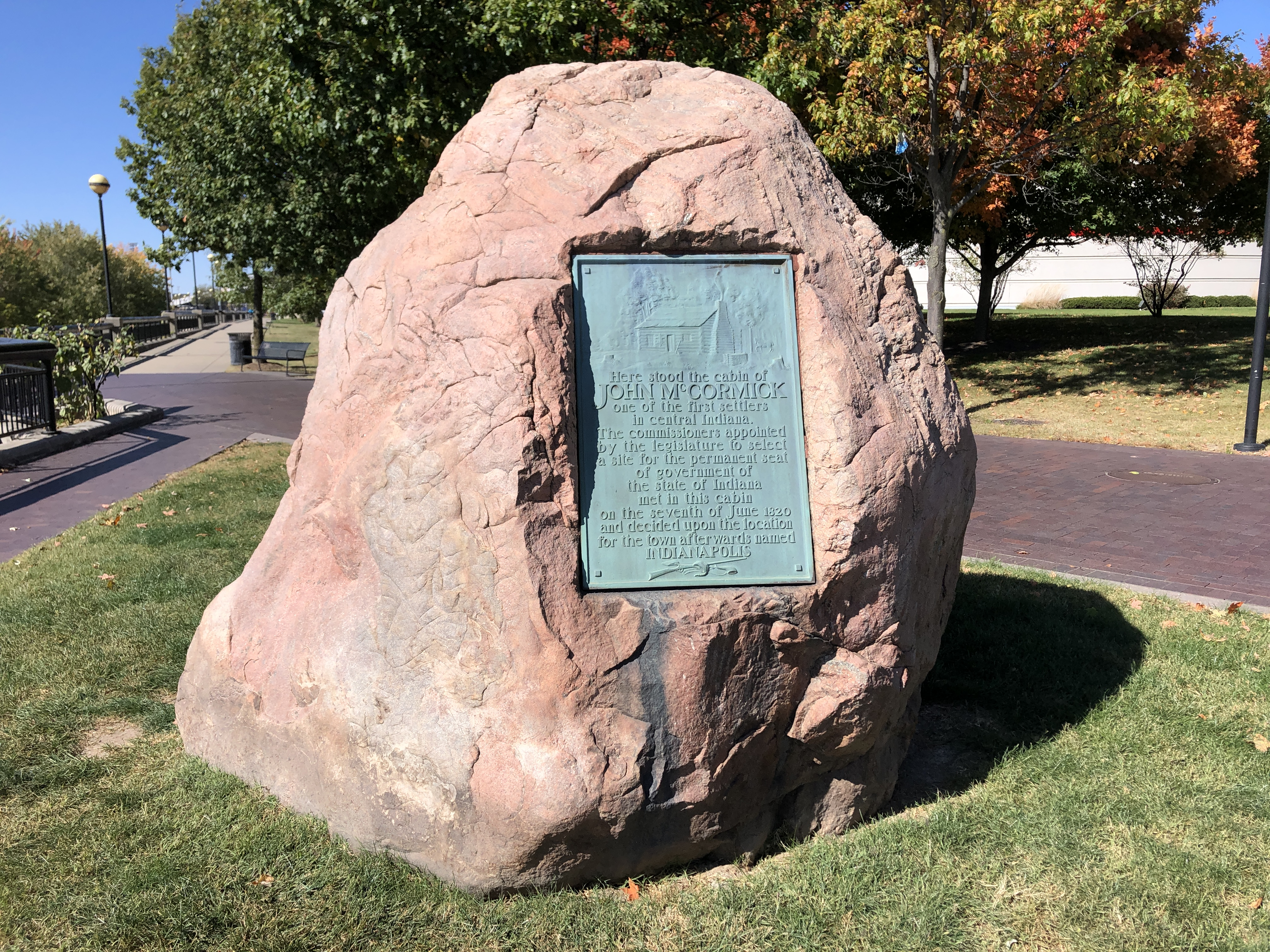
- McCormick Cabin Site in 2022

- Location within Indianapolis Location within Indianapolis Location within Indiana Location within the United States
- Location: White River State Park, Indianapolis, Indiana
- Coordinates: 39°46′4″N 86°10′23″W
- Area: less than one acre
- Built: 1820, 1924
- NRHP reference No.: 81000028
- Added to NRHP: May 28, 1981

McCormick Cabin Site is a historic site located at Indianapolis, Indiana. It is the site of the cabin John Wesley McCormick (1754–1837) built in 1820. It was at the cabin that commissioners appointed by the Indiana legislature met in June 1820 to select the site for the permanent seat of state government at Indianapolis. The site is commemorated by a granite boulder in White River State Park with plaque erected in 1924.

It was listed on the National Register of Historic Places in 1981.

== See also ==
- National Register of Historic Places listings in Center Township, Marion County, Indiana
