= White River Park State Games =

Sport competition in Indianapolis, US (1983–1994)

The White River Park State Games is a defunct sporting competition that took place in Indianapolis, Indiana, from 1983 to 1994. It was for amateur athletes throughout the American state of Indiana.

== History ==
The Governor's Council on Physical Fitness and the White River State Park Development Commission both sponsored the event, in the hope it would promote fitness throughout the state of Indiana. Other goals were to create interest on a grass-roots level for Hoosier amateur sports, create Hoosier athletes who could compete on an Olympic level, and to give Hoosiers the reason to increase their athletic skills. The Indiana Sports Commission coordinated and organized the Games.

Indiana was the fourth state to host such a series of state games, but unlike the first three, Indiana would not hold just tryouts, but actual series of competitions throughout the state, organized by regional divisions. By 1986 there were eight such regions.

The first White River Park State Games took place in July 1983. Of the 92 counties in Indiana, 84 were represented by the 5,600 athletes in the qualifiers for the first games. The finalists from these tryouts, over 3,500 in total, came to Indianapolis to compete in ten sports. Like in the Olympics, competitors could win gold, silver, and bronze medals.

The first national symposium on state games took place in Indianapolis in September 1984. This caused the National Congress of State Games to be formed, with forty different states participating.

In 1989, 21 sports were involved in the games, which saw 22,000 athletes from every Indiana county participating. Their ages ranged from 4 to 84. Total tickets sold to see the events numbered 65,000. The eight regions were Anderson, Columbus, Elkhart, Evansville, Fort Wayne, Logansport, Richmond, and Terre Haute.

By 1991, twenty sports combined had 950 events, with over 24,000 participants attempting to qualify for the games. Besides the different sports, two of these athletes would be on the 1992 United States Olympic team.

The 1993 games saw 9,000 Hoosiers from 11 months old to 73 years old compete in the finals in Indianapolis.

The last White River Park State Games took place in 1994. In 1995, it was replaced by the Hoosier State Games.

== Economics ==
The first games were funded by the Indiana state government, at the cost of US$300,000. Eventually, they were almost self-sufficient. The 1989 budget was $750,000. Corporate sponsors included Conseco, Inc.; Hardee's; Merchants National Corporation; Hook's Drug Stores; Taco Bell; and Marsh Supermarkets. However, the sites for qualifiers would see a considerable boost when visitors hoping to qualify would spend money in hotels, restaurants, and shopping areas. The figures for the economic bursts were $1 million for the regional events, and $8 million for Indianapolis, in 1989.
