= Medal of Honor Memorial (Indianapolis) =

Memorial in Indianapolis, Indiana, US

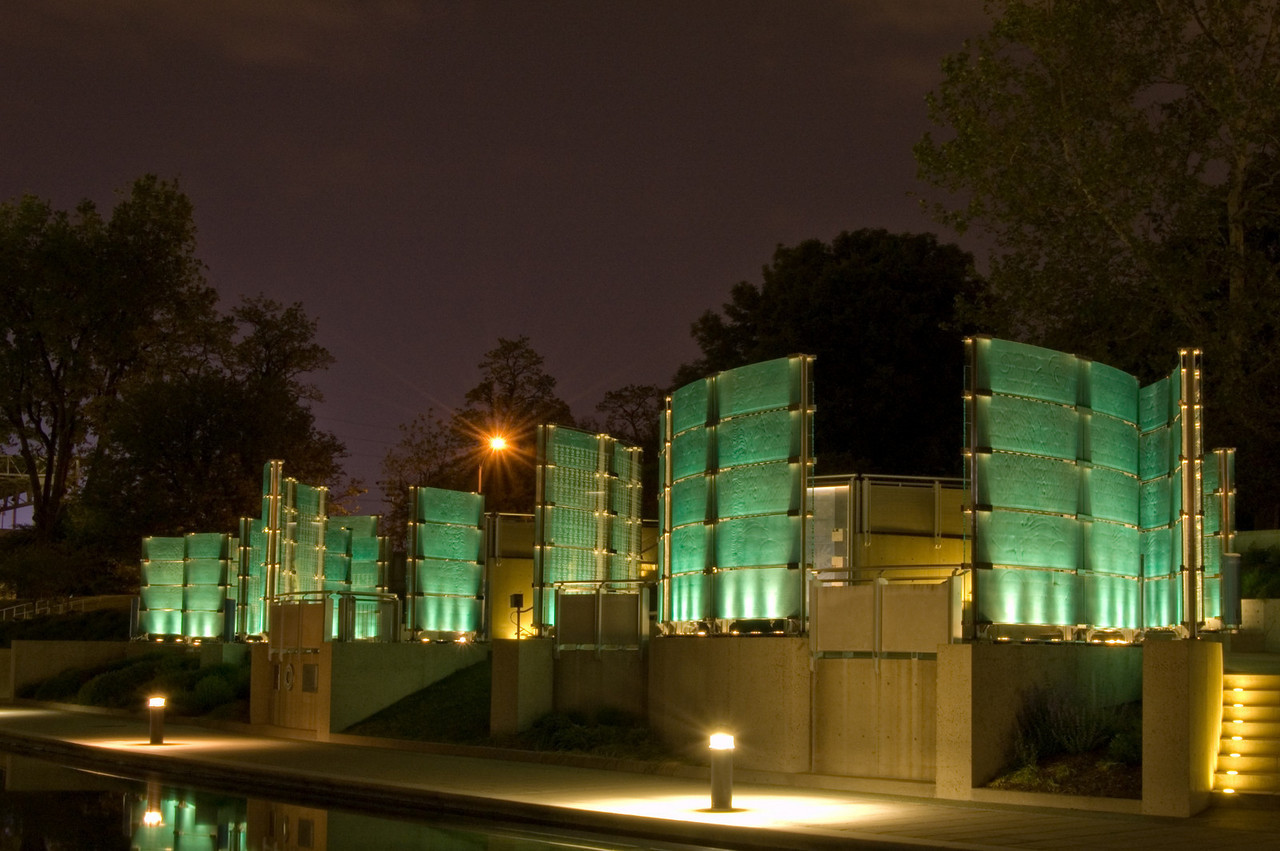
- Medal of Honor Memorial, May 2007
- Interactive map of Medal of Honor Memorial
- Location: Indianapolis, Indiana, U.S.
- Coordinates: 39°46′9.59″N 86°10′7.77″W
- Material: Indiana limestone, steel, concrete
- Beginning date: January 1999
- Opening date: May 28, 1999
- Dedicated to: Medal of Honor recipients

The Medal of Honor Memorial is a monument located in White River State Park in Indianapolis, Indiana, United States. It is dedicated in honor of all recipients of the Medal of Honor, the United States military's highest award for valor. The memorial was unveiled May 28, 1999, during Memorial Day weekend. The memorial is part of the Indiana War Memorials Commission.

== Design ==
The memorial is located on the north bank of the Indiana Central Canal, adjacent to Military Park, and consists of 27 glass panels set in concrete bases. Indiana limestone in shades of buff, gray, and pink are also a part of the monument. The panels are arranged into 15 walls, each representing an armed conflict in which a Medal of Honor was awarded. The names of the recipients are etched into the glass. At the time of dedication, there were 3,436 Medal of Honor recipients etched into the monument.

The memorial also contains an elaborate lighting system that illuminates certain panels to correspond with a 30-minute audio tour that is played over a speaker system. The audio tour is made up of stories about the wars, and accounts of living Medal recipients. Many of the stories were recorded by Medal of Honor recipients.

== Origin ==
After reading an article in The New York Times about a June 1998 meeting in upstate New York of the Congressional Medal of Honor Society, John Hodowal, chairman of the Indianapolis-based Indianapolis Power & Light (IPALCO), and his wife, Caroline, were inspired to assist in the creation of a memorial to honor these individuals whose courageous acts earned them the Medal of Honor, the United States' highest military honor. The site that was chosen was the same area where Indianapolis's first recorded Independence Day celebration was held. Additionally, the site was utilized as a military camp during the U.S. Civil War.

== Construction and dedication ==
Site preparation began in November 1998, and construction of the memorial began in January 1999. 96 living Medal of Honor recipients attended the unveiling and dedication of the monument on Memorial Day, May 28, 1999.

Architect landscape artists Eric Fulford and Ann Reed of ROAMworks designed the monument. The monument was sponsored by IPALCO Enterprises.

== Award ==
The memorial received a 2001 Merit Award from the American Society of Landscape Architects.

== See also ==
- United States Naval Academy Cemetery § Medal of Honor recipients
- Kentucky Medal of Honor Memorial
- National Medal of Honor Museum
- Oregon Veterans Medal of Honor Memorial
- Texas Medal of Honor Memorial
