= NCAA Hall of Champions =

Sports museum in Indianapolis, Indiana, US

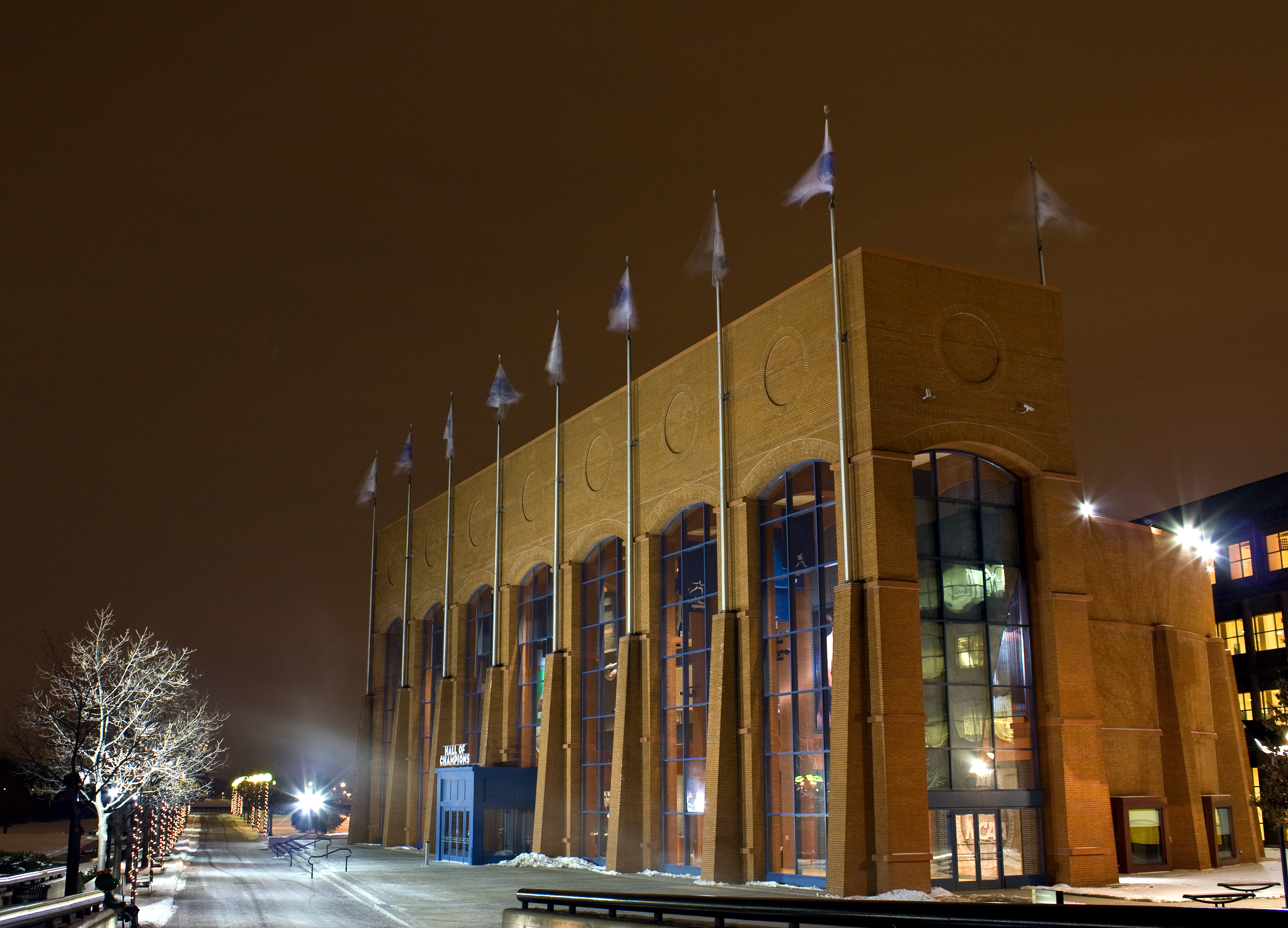
- Exterior of NCAA Hall of Champions at White River State Park
- Established: March 31, 2000; 26 years ago
- Location: White River State Park, Indianapolis, Indiana, U.S.
- Coordinates: 39.767160°N 86.169156°W
- Type: Sports museum
- Visitors: 7,948 (2020)
- Directors: Mike King (Managing Director of Operations)
- Architect: Michael Graves
- Owner: National Collegiate Athletic Association
- Public transit access: 8
- Website: www.ncaahallofchampions.org

The NCAA Hall of Champions is an interactive museum and part of a three-building complex that houses a conference center and the corporate headquarters of both the National Collegiate Athletic Association (NCAA) and National Federation of State High School Associations (NFHS) in White River State Park in downtown Indianapolis, Indiana, United States.

It was constructed as part of the NCAA's headquarters relocation to Indianapolis from Kansas City, Missouri. The complex was designed by Indianapolis-native and postmodern architect, Michael Graves. The museum contains a 90-seat orientation theater, two floors of exhibition space, and a gift shop. The grand hall honors collegiate athletes representing the NCAA's 24 sanctioned sports across its three divisions and includes the banners of each member institution.

== History ==
The Hall of Champions opened on March 31, 2000, ahead of the 2000 NCAA Division I Men's Basketball Championship Game held in Indianapolis on April 3, 2000. Indiana Governor Frank O'Bannon and NCAA president Cedric Dempsey presided over the opening ceremony, with 3,000 dignitaries in attendance. NASA astronaut Steven Smith (a two-time NCAA Champion in water polo as a Stanford University student) attended the event, bringing with him a blue ribbon that traveled aboard the Space Shuttle Discovery mission, STS-103. It was used in the ribbon-cutting, with slivers cut and distributed to attendees. The construction project cost $10 million.

In November 2007, an electrical fire struck the building, concentrated largely in the "One Shining Moment" portion of the display and areas immediately surrounding it. The Hall was temporarily closed for renovations and reopened on March 12, 2009.

Prior to the COVID-19 pandemic, the Hall of Champions received about 44,000 visitors annually.

In 2021, a six-person panel of American Institute of Architects (AIA) Indianapolis members identified the Hall of Champions among the ten most "architecturally significant" buildings completed in the city since World War II.

== See also ==
- List of attractions and events in Indianapolis
