= Southport Presbyterian Church =

Presbyterian church in Indiana, United States

- Southport Presbyterian Church
- 39.6558°N 86.0833°W
- Address: 7525 McFarland Blvd, Indianapolis, Indiana
- Country: United States
- Denomination: Evangelical Presbyterian Church
- Website: southportpres.org

History
- Founded: 30 March 1833

Architecture
- Completed: 1998

Southport Presbyterian Church is a Presbyterian church in Indianapolis, Indiana, United States. It is affiliated with the Evangelical Presbyterian Church. The church was established on March 30, 1833, in Southport. A historical marker designates the church's original location.
