= Golden Hill Historic District (Indianapolis, Indiana) =

Historic district in Indiana, United States

- U.S. National Register of Historic Places
- U.S. Historic district
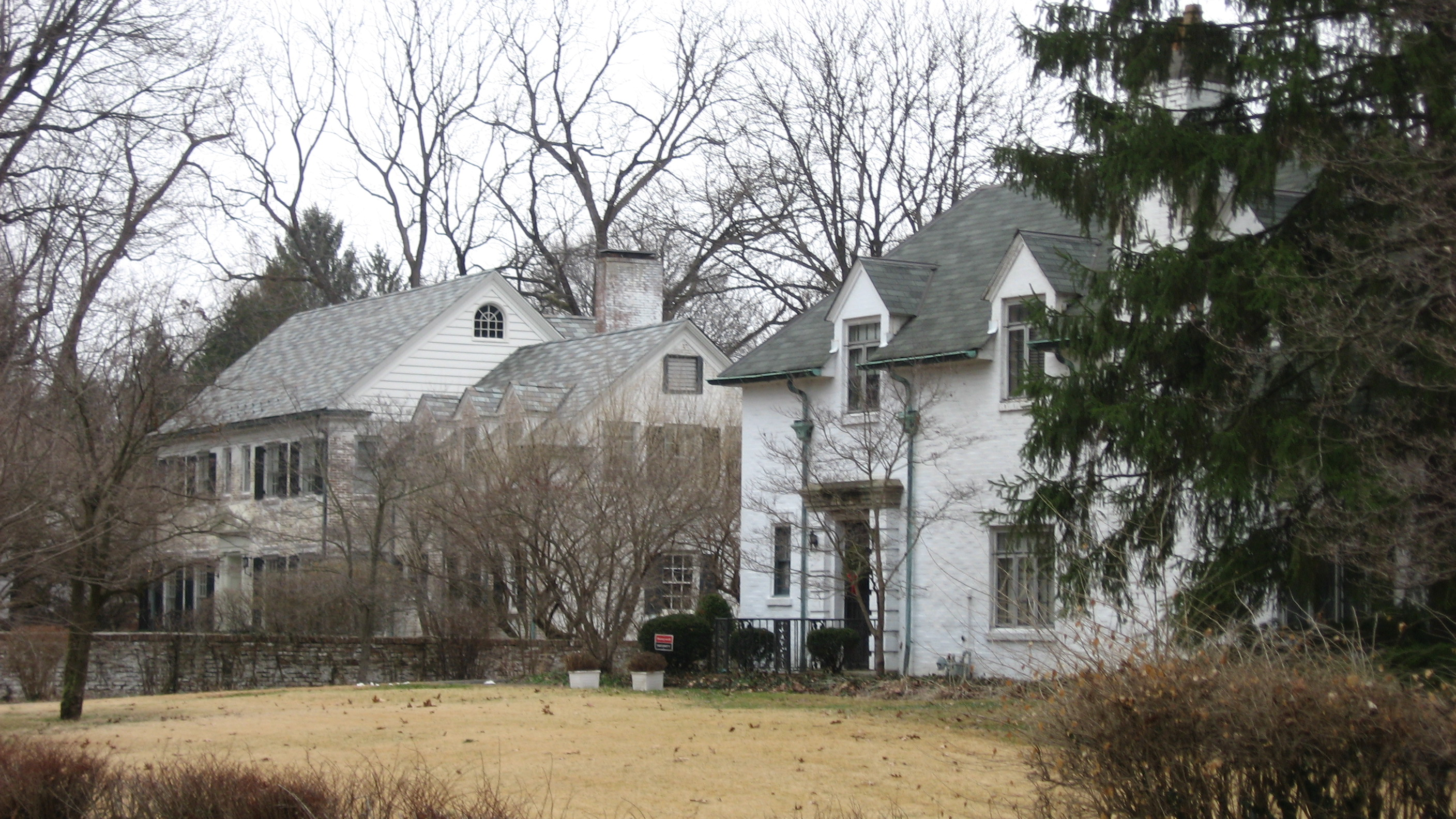
- Houses in the 1200 block of Golden Hill Drive

- Location within Indianapolis Location within Indiana Location within the United States
- Location: Roughly bounded by 36th St., 37th St., Governors Rd., the rear lot lines behind Golden Hill Dr., and Central Canal, Indianapolis, Indiana
- Coordinates: 39°49′9″N 86°11′6″W
- Area: 56 acres (23 ha)
- Architect: Multiple
- Architectural style: Colonial Revival, Tudor Revival, Italian Renaissance
- NRHP reference No.: 91001163
- Added to NRHP: August 29, 1991

Golden Hill is an affluent and historic neighborhood overlooking the White River in Indianapolis, Indiana. The district is bounded on the east by Clifton Street, which is west of Martin Luther King Jr. Boulevard (formerly Northwestern Avenue); on the west by the White River and the Central Canal; on the south by Thirty-sixth Street; and on the north by Woodstock Country Club, immediately south of Thirty-eighth Street. Golden Hill is noted for its collection of homes designed by several of the city's prominent architects. The estate homes reflect several styles of period revival architecture. The district is known as for its community planning and remains an exclusive enclave for the city's prominent families. Golden Hill was added to the National Register of Historic Places in 1991.

Originally platted by 1872, the area remained undeveloped until David McLean Parry, a wealthy Indianapolis industrialist, acquired a 100 acres (40 hectares) tract on a ridge overlooking the White River between 1900 and 1907. The neighborhood takes its name from Parry's Golden Hill estate home. Scottish landscape architect George MacDougall designed its grounds. Further development began after Parry's death in 1915, when Parry's heirs hired MacDougall to plan an elegant residential subdivision. Platted as Golden Hill Estates, it was among the city's elite neighborhoods by the 1920s.

Fifty-four grand homes, several of them designed by Indianapolis's leading architects, were built along Golden Hill's winding, tree-lined streets. All but eleven of them were built between 1915 and 1940, the historic district's period of significance. The neighborhood's oldest home dates to 1895. One of Golden Hill's unusual features was an Alaskan totem pole that once stood near on the Parry estate. Totem Lane is named in reference to the local landmark, which was one of fifteen totem poles that Alaska's district governor, John Green Brady, collected from villages in southeastern Alaska in 1903. They were displayed at the Louisiana Purchase Exposition in Saint Louis in 1904. (The one that ended up at Golden Hill was placed outside the Esquimau Village.) A replica of the Golden Hill totem pole is installed at The Eiteljorg Museum of American Indians and Western Art in Indianapolis.

== History ==
Although it had been platted in 1872, the neighborhood that became known as Golden Hill remained undeveloped until David McLean Parry, a wealthy industrialist and president of the Parry Manufacturing Company in Indianapolis, acquired property in the area between 1900 and 1907 to build a new home. Parry named his private estate Golden Hill. Scottish landscape architect George MacDougall designed the grounds for the estate on 100 acres (40 hectares) of woods and rolling terrain overlooking the White River.

Further development began after Parry's death in 1915, when the family hired George MacDougall to plan an elegant residential subdivision with additional curving streets and beautiful green spaces for the city's wealthy families. Parry's heirs divided his land into smaller parcels, which was platted as Golden Hill Estates in 1915. Lots in the new residential development initially sold for $2,000 to $3,000 each.

By the 1920s Golden Hill was among the city's elite neighborhoods that also included the estate developments of Woodstock, Crows Nest, and Williams Creek. Of the fifty-four grand homes built at Golden Hill, all but of eleven of them were constructed between 1915 and 1940, the historic district's period of significance. Golden Hill's collection of homes, several of them designed by the city's prominent architects, reflect a variety of period revival architecture styles. The district is also known as for its community planning.

In addition to Parry, whose heirs remained at Golden Hill until 1941, the neighborhood's previous residents included Dr. and Mrs. George H. A. Clowes, William B. Stokely (chairman of the board of Stokely-Van Camp, Inc. from 1948 to 1966), and William A. Atkins (heir to the E. C. Atkins and Company), among others. Ownership of Golden Hill homes generally stayed within the neighborhood's families, or were sold to family friends. Few were listed for sale on the open real estate market until the early 1990s. The Golden Hill Historic District remains an exclusive enclave for the city's prominent families. It was added to the National Register of Historic Places in 1991.

== Geography ==
Golden Hill is an affluent and historic neighborhood on an upper ridge overlooking the White River. It is located on the near northwest side of Indianapolis, about 4.5 miles (7.2 km) from the city's center. The secluded neighborhood on gently rolling terrain is bounded on the east by Clifton Street, which is west of Martin Luther King Jr. Boulevard (formerly Northwestern Avenue), on the west by the White River and the Central Canal, on the south by Thirty-sixth Street, and on the north by Woodstock Country Club, which is immediately south of Thirty-eighth Street. The historic district's eastern boundary is adjacent to Bertha Ross Park, which obscures the neighborhood from traffic on Martin Luther King Jr. Boulevard.

Golden Hill's estate homes are set along winding, tree-lined streets, on secluded property. The area immediately south of Golden Hill, south of Thirty-sixth Street, contains a neighborhood of smaller homes, many of them in the Bungalow and American Foursquare architectural styles.

== Notable features ==
Golden Hill remains a residential neighborhood of large estate homes in park-like setting with well-manicured lawns and gardens. The historic district contains fifty-four estate homes. Eleven of them fall outside the district's period of historical significance, which is 1904 to 1940.

=== Oldest home ===
The neighborhood's oldest home dates to 1895, when it served at the homestead for the surrounding farmland. It was later altered into a substantial home in the Neo-Classical style.

=== Parry estate ===
The neighborhood takes its name from David M. Parry's estate, which he called Golden Hill. The expansive home, built on a bluff overlooking the White River and the Central Canal in 1904, has an American Craftsman architectural style with Tudor Revival elements. William A. Atkins purchased the home on 4.5 acres (1.8 hectares) of land in 1927. The Atkins family, who remodeled and enlarged the home to 21,000 square feet, continued as its owners until the 1960s. The vacant and deteriorated home was restored in 2012.

=== Other homes ===
Several of Indianapolis's leading architects designed homes at Golden Hill. These include Frederick Wallick; Pierre and Wright; Burns and James; and Foltz, Osler and Thompson, among others. The district's homes have a variety of architectural styles such as Tudor Revival, Colonial Revival, French Eclectic architecture, Italian Renaissance, and Spanish Mission Revival.

One home on Governors Road is notable for its unusual building materials. It was constructed around 1936 of concrete masonry in an effort to make it fireproof. The home's cinderblock exterior is covered in stucco.

=== Bridge, gatehouse, and gates ===
Golden Hill's stone bridge, gatehouse, and stone entrance gates at Thirty-sixth Street and Totem Lane are part of the original Parry estate and date from the turn of the twentieth century, when MacDougall initially designed the landscape. The fieldstone walls and gatehouse are built in the American Craftsman style to complement the Parry home.

=== Totem Lane ===
Golden Hill's Totem Lane is named in reference to a totem pole that once stood on the grounds of the Parry estate. The totem pole originally came from the Haida village of Koianglas, Alaska. It was given to Parry by Russell E. Gardner, a friend from Saint Louis, Missouri. The totem pole is one of fifteen that Alaska's district governor, John Green Brady, collected from villages in southeastern Alaska in 1903. Fourteen of them were installed outside the Alaska pavilion during the Louisiana Purchase Exposition at Saint Louis in 1904. The totem pole that ended up at Golden Hill was broken in transit, but it was repaired and placed on display outside the Esquimau Village during the exposition. Thirteen poles were eventually returned to Alaska and installed in the Sitka National Historical Park, one was sold to the Milwaukee Public Museum, and Gardner purchased the one he gave to Parry.

The totem pole remained a Golden Hill landmark until 1948, when the decayed pole, which had fallen down during a storm, was removed. None of its remains are known to exist. The totem's site at Golden Hill is identified with an Indiana Historical Bureau marker. A stone and bronze monument also marks its former location on the Parry estate. A replica of the Golden Hill totem pole was raised on April 13, 1996, on the front lawn of The Eiteljorg Museum of American Indians and Western Art in Indianapolis, and was later installed in an interior atrium at the museum.

== See also ==
- List of neighborhoods in Indianapolis
- National Register of Historic Places listings in Center Township, Marion County, Indiana
- Westerley House
