= Military Park (Indianapolis) =

Park and historic site in Indianapolis, Indiana, US

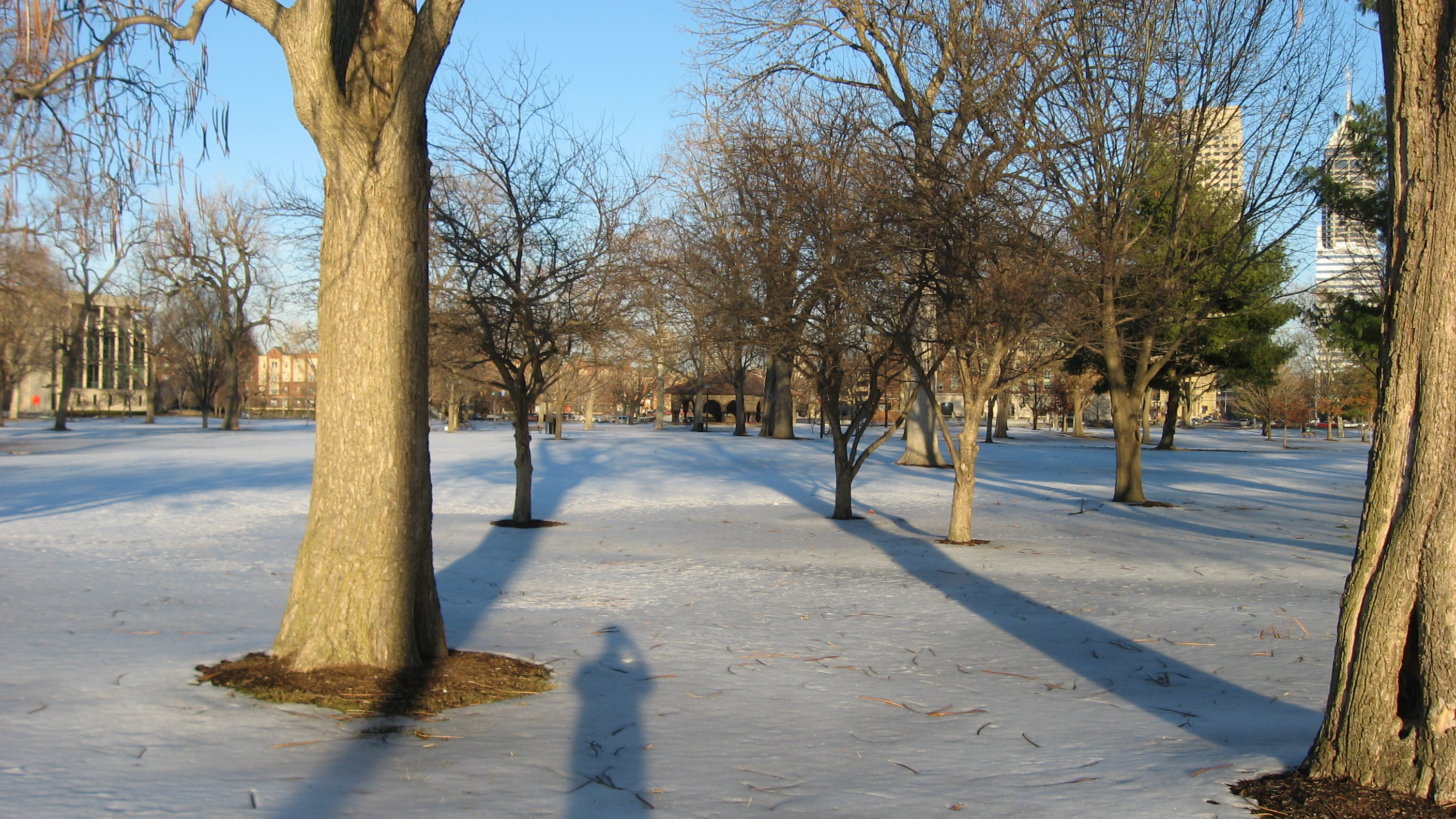
- Military Park in 2011
- Interactive map highlighting Military Park within White River State Park
- Type: Urban park, state park
- Location: White River State Park; Indianapolis, Indiana, U.S.
- Area: 14 acres (5.7 ha)
- Opened: 1852; 174 years ago
- Owner: State of Indiana
- Operator: White River State Park Development Commission
- Open: Daily, 5 a.m. to 11 p.m.
- Status: Open all year
- Military Park
- U.S. National Register of Historic Places
- U.S. Historic district
- NRHP reference No.: 69000002
- Added to NRHP: October 28, 1969

Military Park is the oldest urban park in Indianapolis, Indiana, United States, covering 14 acres (6 ha). It is located in western downtown Indianapolis. It was added to the National Register of Historic Places on October 28, 1969.

== History ==
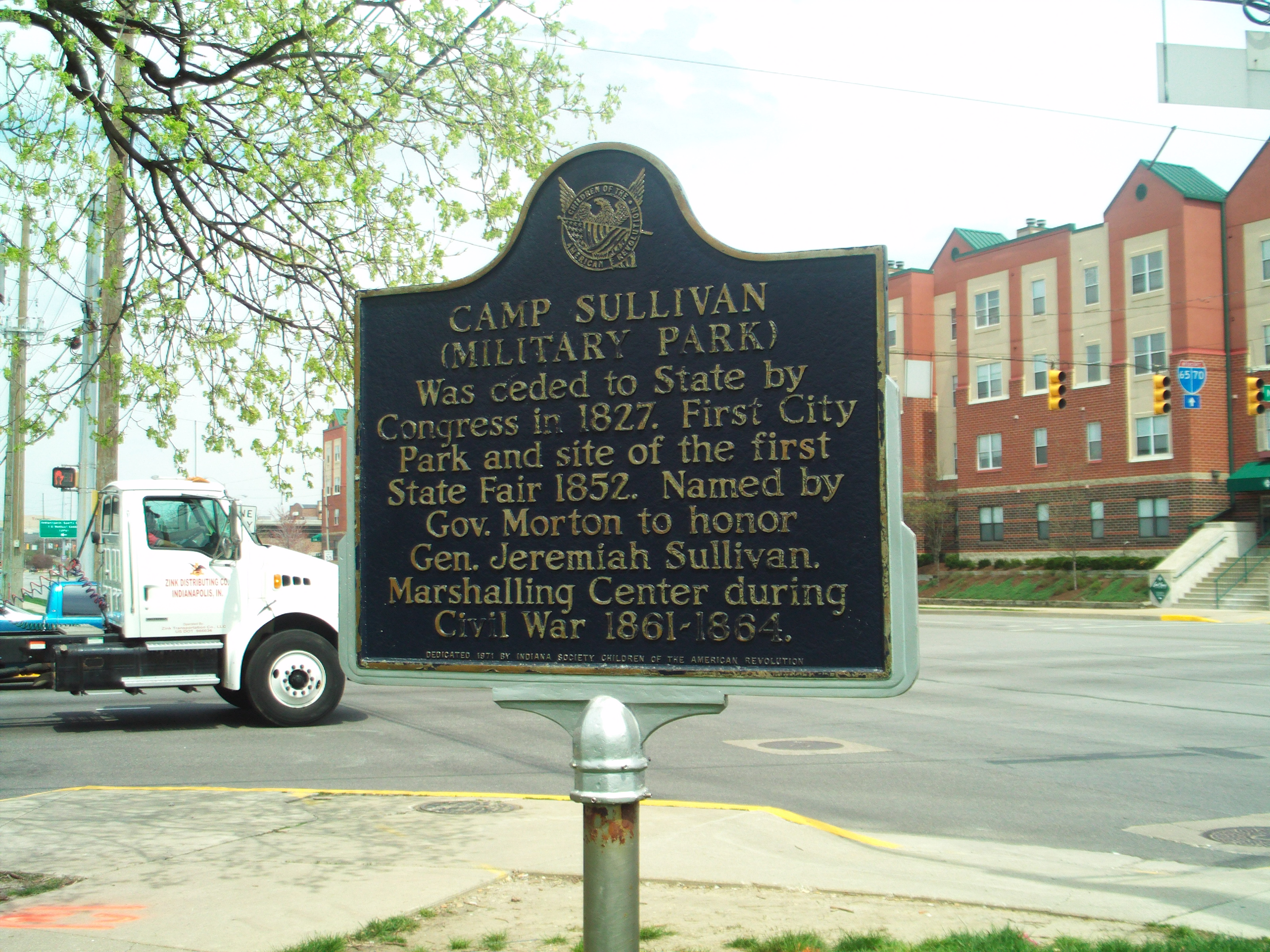
Historical marker at the park

The grounds of Military Park, originally called Military Ground, have seen various uses since the founding of Indianapolis in 1820. The first documented celebration of Independence Day in the city occurred at Military Ground on July 4, 1822. The United States Congress officially gave the land to the state of Indiana in 1827 for use in training the local militias. Prior to 1860, its greatest use for militia training was for the Black Hawk War in 1836.

In accordance with the 1851 Indiana Constitution, the land that forms Military Park cannot be sold; only Monument Circle and half of the Indiana State Capitol grounds share this distinction. The first Indiana State Fair was held at the park in October 1852. The site continued to be used whenever the fair was held in Indianapolis until 1860 when the fair was moved to what would later become Camp Morton during the Civil War. Stalls and exhibition halls were built on the grounds for the fair, surrounded by a large wooden fence. The state fair made one last appearance on Military Park in 1863.

During the Civil War, Union soldiers were encamped at the park. Governor Oliver P. Morton renamed the park Camp Sullivan, after the 13th Indiana Infantry's Colonel Jeremiah C. Sullivan. It was the first designated camp for the Federal army in Marion County, Indiana. However, this use severely damaged the grounds, due to the different troops entering and leaving Camp Sullivan, as it was a marshaling center. Following the war, efforts by local resident George Merritt started to improve the grounds, with the addition of a fountain and a small pool with a rock foundation of considerable size. Relics from the war and playground equipment were also added, as was a pavilion that still stands.

William Jennings Bryan was notified that he would be the Democratic nominee for the Presidency of the United States on August 7, 1900. The two-hour rally was preceded by a march by the candidates from Indianapolis's Union Station.

In 1916, the park was renamed Camp Sullivan Park. Between World War I and World War II, the park began to deteriorate. On October 28, 1969, the park, again known as Military Park, was added to the National Register of Historic Places. The park continued to deteriorate until 1980 when the Lilly Endowment and Krannert Charitable Trust granted funds for its improvement. In 1979, it became part of White River State Park.

In 2007, the park's shelter house was renovated for over $700,000.

== See also ==
- Indianapolis in the American Civil War
- List of parks in Indianapolis
- National Register of Historic Places listings in Center Township, Marion County, Indiana
