= Joseph W. Summers Memorial Bridge =

Historic bridge in Marion County, Indiana, United States

Coordinates: 39.8035°N 86.1566°W

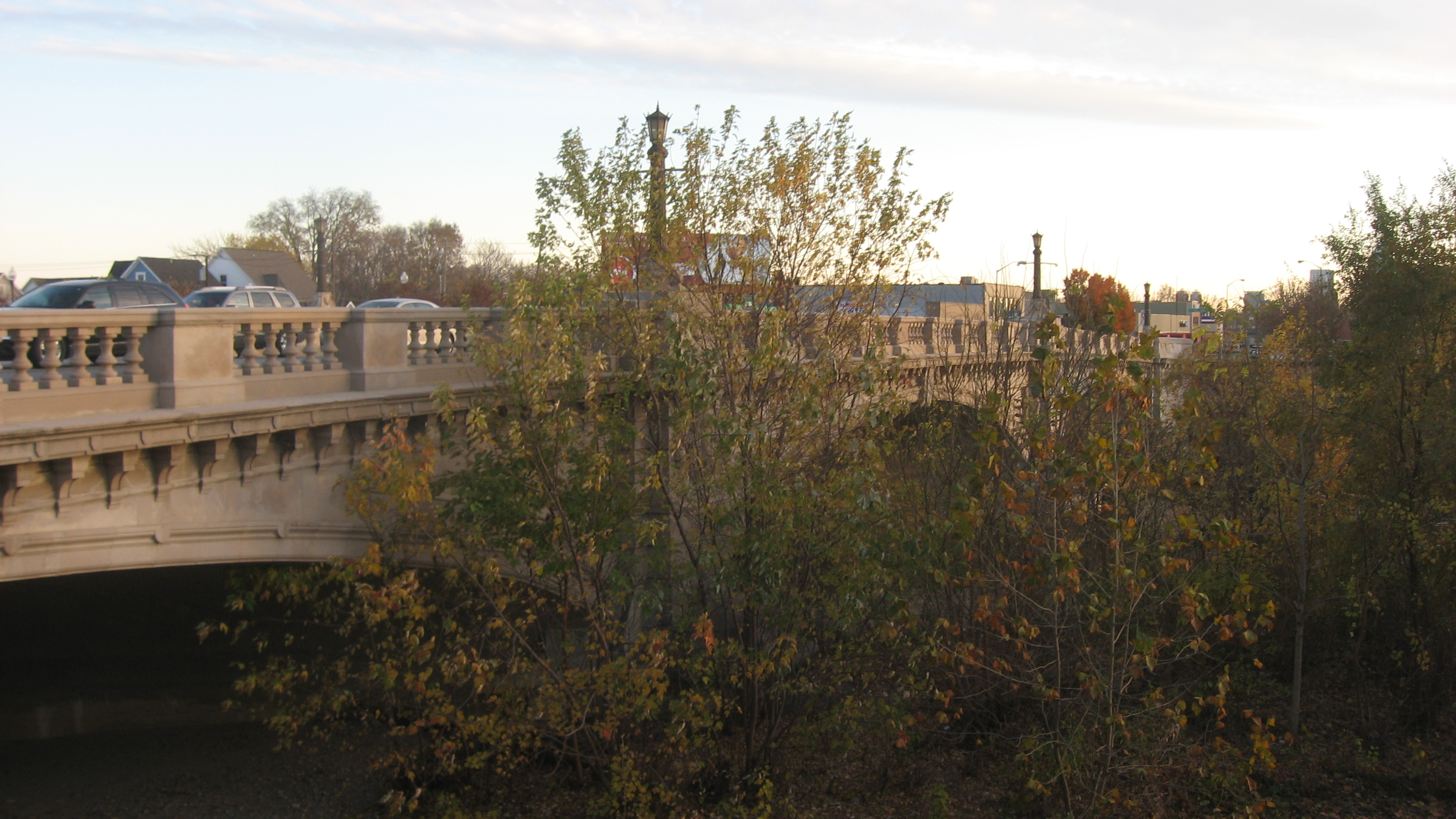
Joseph W. Summers Memorial Bridge

The Joseph W. Summers Memorial Bridge is a road bridge carrying Meridian Street over Fall Creek in northern Indianapolis, Indiana.

The first bridge at the site was given funding permissions in 1876 by Marion County to Cleveland Bridge & Iron Company. The bridge was completed in 1879 and was 200 feet (61 m) tall, traveling over Fall Creek. It was built and designed with a Neoclassical style in its original iron, and was rebuilt and redesigned by Henry Klaussman in 1899. In 1913, the bridge took large amounts of flood damage and the city signed a contract with the Dunn-McCarty Company to construct a new bridge.

The new bridge was built in 1917 and designed by George Kessler. It was originally called both the Fall Creek Bridge and North Meridian Street bridge. It was then named after Joseph W. Summers, a state representative who also served as a key community leader when it came to diversity and racial relations, as well as being a funeral director. Summers died in 1991, after which the bridge was renamed. The historical marker for the bridge was placed in 1995.
