= Perry Township German Greenhouses =

Historic greenhouses operating in Indianapolis

Coordinates: 39.6896°N 86.1740°W

The Perry Township German Greenhouses and Truck Gardens were a location in which German immigrants lived and gardened. In the mid-1800s, the German immigrants settled around Marion County, starting greenhouses and truck gardens to trade and sell. From this growth, they established trade organizations to provide benefits and boost economic growth among the community. The German community contributed to local schooling and politics as well in Indianapolis, financially and physically supporting them.

== History ==
In the mid-19th century, there was a boost in immigration from Germany to the United States, specifically near Bluff Road in Indianapolis. They grew and sold general produce, such as tomatoes, lettuce, beets, asparagus, spinach, kale and etc. The immigrants formed a coalition, German Gardeners Benefit Society of Indianapolis, and operated within this organization. Produce, as well as flowers, trees and other plants, were distributed through the Indianapolis City Market.

Another brand established by these immigrants is the "Hoosier Boy" brand, established in the 1920s. After a drop in greenhouse presence and growers and the introduction of refrigerated trucking in the 1960s, there was a period in which the GGBS declined operations. In 2025, Paul Schlegel, a third generation rower and gardener, took over the Hoosier Boy patent. The brand was renamed to Hoosier Boy Schlegel Greenhouse.

Multiple displays and exhibitions have been established to preserve the history of German Greenhouses in Indiana. Effort has been taken to keep the Hoosier Boy Greenhouses within the families.
