= White River State Park =

Urban park in Indianapolis, Indiana, US

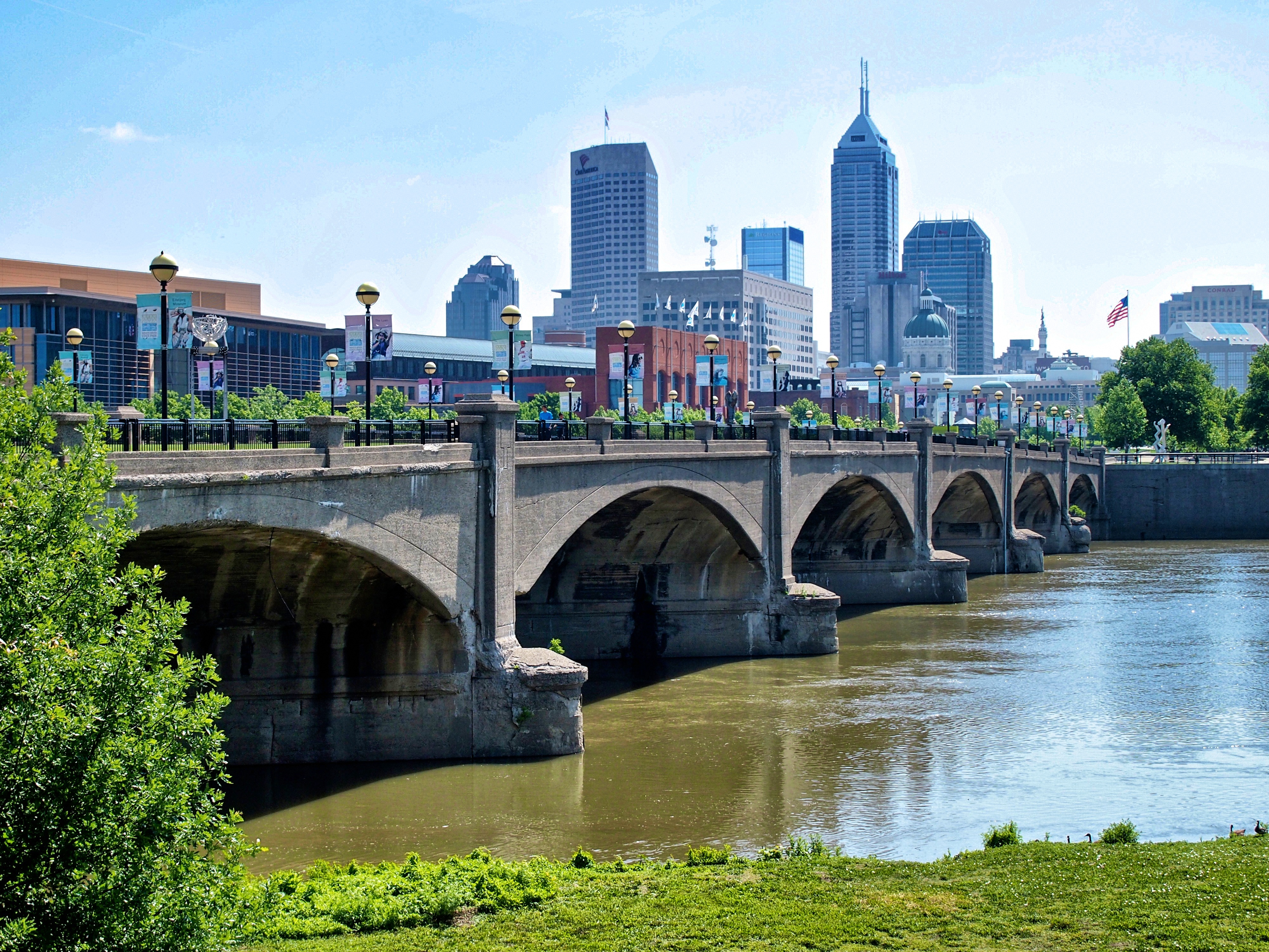
- Old Washington Street Bridge, White River, and downtown Indianapolis skyline from the park
- Interactive map outlining the park's boundaries
- Type: Urban park, state park
- Location: Indianapolis, Indiana, U.S.
- Coordinates: 39°46′00″N 86°10′11″W
- Area: 267 acres (108 ha)
- Created: 1979; 47 years ago
- Owner: State of Indiana
- Operator: White River State Park Development Commission
- Visitors: 2.8 million (Note: Visitation in 2022 was reported as the combined attendance of the park's individual attractions, including the Eiteljorg Museum of American Indians and Western Art, the Indiana State Museum and IMAX Theater, the Indianapolis Zoo, the NCAA Hall of Champions, TCU Amphitheater, and Victory Field.)
- Open: Daily, 5 a.m. to 11 p.m.
- Status: Open all year
- Public transit: 8 Indiana Pacers Bikeshare
- Website: www.whiteriverstatepark.org

White River State Park is an urban park in downtown Indianapolis, Indiana, United States. Situated along the eastern and western banks of its namesake White River, the park covers 267 acres (108 ha). The park is home to numerous attractions, including the Eiteljorg Museum of American Indians and Western Art, the Indiana State Museum, the Indianapolis Zoo, the NCAA Hall of Champions, Victory Field, Everwise Amphitheater, and White River Gardens.

The park and Downtown Canal comprise one of the city's official cultural districts, designated as Canal and White River State Park.

== History ==
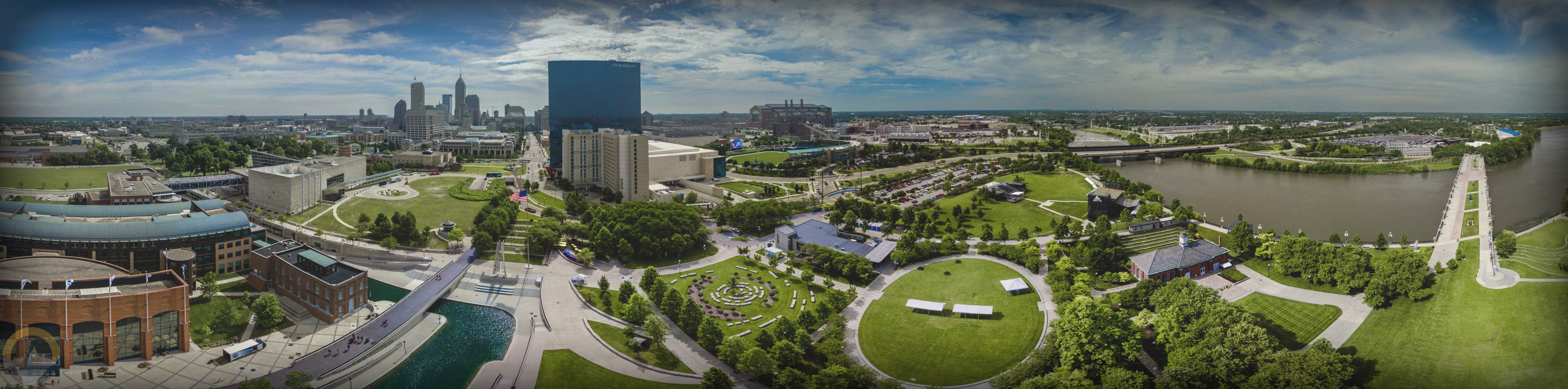
270° aerial panorama of White River State Park and surroundings in 2017: NCAA Hall of Champions and Downtown Canal (direction: N), the Indiana State Museum, Military Park, and Eiteljorg Museum (NE), downtown Indianapolis (E), Victory Field (SE), Everwise Amphitheater and West Washington Street Pumping Station (S), White River (SW), and the Indianapolis Zoo, White River Gardens, and old Washington Street Bridge (W).

Initial plans for the park were conceived by civic leaders in the late 1970s to capitalize on the city's amateur sports economic development strategy. Bipartisan support from state legislators and seed money from corporate partners led to the organization of a quasi-governmental commission to oversee the park's planning and operations. Construction began in the 1980s with the acquisition and clearing of blighted industrial properties and the realignment of Washington Street for redevelopment.

Restoration of this area began in the late 1980s when public attention fell on the Indiana Central Canal corridor. The canal was originally engineered in the 1830s as a way to ship goods through the state of Indiana, but the project, as governed by the Indiana Mammoth Internal Improvement Act, went bankrupt and the Indianapolis section of the canal was the only section that was ever dug. Although the canal was never used for its intended purpose, recent restoration and redevelopment have allowed the area to function as a cultural center within the city.

In 1980, architect César Pelli's Indiana Tower was proposed as the park's focal point; however, the 750-foot (229 m) observation tower was never constructed due to funding concerns and public criticism of the tower's design. Since, several proposed attractions have been considered, including an Indiana African American History Museum, seasonal ice skating rink, tethered balloon ride, amusement park, and public beach.

From 1983 until 1994, the park co-sponsored the White River Park State Games alongside the Governor's Council on Physical Fitness and Sport. The games were intended to promote a healthy lifestyle and encourage Hoosier athletes to participate in sports.

A number of existing buildings on the site of the park were demolished. Among them was the Oscar McCulloch School Number 5, which was built at the corner of Washington and California streets in 1920. The park commission had earlier agreed to repurpose the building, but because it stood on the proposed site for the Eiteljorg Museum of American Indians and Western Art and the Indiana State Museum, the park commissioners voted on August 14, 1985, to raze the school. The demolition began two hours later, and the demolition crew later said that they had been instructed to work through the night to remove as much of the school building by the next morning. The Historic Landmarks Foundation of Indiana obtained an injunction to stop the demolition, citing the presence of asbestos. Sidney Weedman, the commission's executive director, explained that the commissioners feared that groups wanting to preserve the school would tie the issue up in court for several years, preventing progress on the park. The commission was fined $2,000 for the improper asbestos removal and agreed to preserve the front façade with its terracotta design work for use in the new state museum. Although some wanted the façade to be placed on the exterior of the museum, it was ultimately decided to erect it inside the Grand Hall, where it serves as the entrance to the education center.

On September 11, 1992, a plane carrying four prominent community leaders—park executive director Robert V. Welch, Frank McKinney, John Weliever, and Michael Carroll—collided with a private plane on its way to Columbus, Ohio. All four men were instrumental in the park's development. A memorial honoring their memory was placed in the park near the Old Washington Street Bridge.

In December 2020, officials announced that the park's footprint would expand by 10 acres (4.0 ha) as part of a $100 million public-private partnership between the State of Indiana, City of Indianapolis, and Elanco to redevelop the neighboring General Motors site to the south. The new parkland will hug the west riverbank and incorporate a portion of the former plant's preserved crane bay, designed by industrial architect Albert Kahn.

== Ownership and operations ==
White River State Park is owned by the State of Indiana under the auspices of the White River State Park Development Commission, a quasi-governmental board composed of ten commissioners. The commission is charged with overseeing park maintenance, marketing, operations, and future development. The commission was created in 1979 by the Indiana General Assembly to distinguish the park from those managed by the Indiana Department of Natural Resources.

== Attractions ==
Map of notable sites at White River State Park
1 Downtown Canal
2 Eiteljorg Museum
3 Indiana State Museum
4 Indianapolis Zoo
5 McCormick Cabin Site
6 Medal of Honor Memorial
7 Military Park
8 NCAA Hall of Champions
9 NCAA National Office
10 Everwise Amphitheater
11 Victory Field
12 West Washington Street Pumping Station
13 White River Gardens
- Indiana State Museum

2002 – Opened

- IMAX 3D Theatre

1996 – Opened as Indiana's only IMAX theatre and still the largest IMAX theatre in Indiana

- Victory Field

1996 – Opened as home of the Indianapolis Indians

- Eiteljorg Museum of American Indians and Western Art

1989 – Opened as the park's second attraction
2005 – Opened expanded gallery space, education facility, performance/special event areas, and indoor/outdoor dining restaurant doubled the museum's size

- NCAA Headquarters and Hall of Champions Museum

1999–2000 – Relocated to Indianapolis from Kansas City

- Indianapolis Zoo

1988 – Established as park's first attraction

- White River State Park Concert Series and Everwise Amphitheater

2004 – Opened inaugural summer concert season at a temporary concert venue, the 7,500-seat "Farm Bureau Insurance Lawn"
2007 – Doubled concert attendance with 50,000+ spectators, included 11 shows
2018 Plans to replace temporary structure announced by White River State Park Development Commission
2019 – Construction begun on $27 million "TCU Amphitheater at White River State Park", with 3,000 permanent seats and a general admission lawn area for 4,500
2021 – Construction of TCU (now Everwise) Amphitheater completed

- White River State Park Visitors' Center (Dr. Frank P. Lloyd Sr. Visitors Center)

2003 – Opened

- White River Gardens

1999 – Opened

- Historic Washington Street Pedestrian Bridge

1916 – Opened as part of the National Road
1994 – Repurposed as a pedestrian bridge to connect the park's greenspaces to the White River Gardens at the Indianapolis Zoo
1999 – Art Sculptures in the Park began on the bridge

- National Federation of State High School Associations Headquarters (NFHS)

1999–2000 – Relocated to Indianapolis from Kansas City

- Medal of Honor Memorial

1999 – Opened
2001 – recognized in Landscape Architecture Magazine

- Military Park

1822 – Site of Indianapolis's first documented 4th of July celebration
1852 – Site of first Indiana State Fair
1861 – Civil War encampment until 1865

- Historic Pumphouse

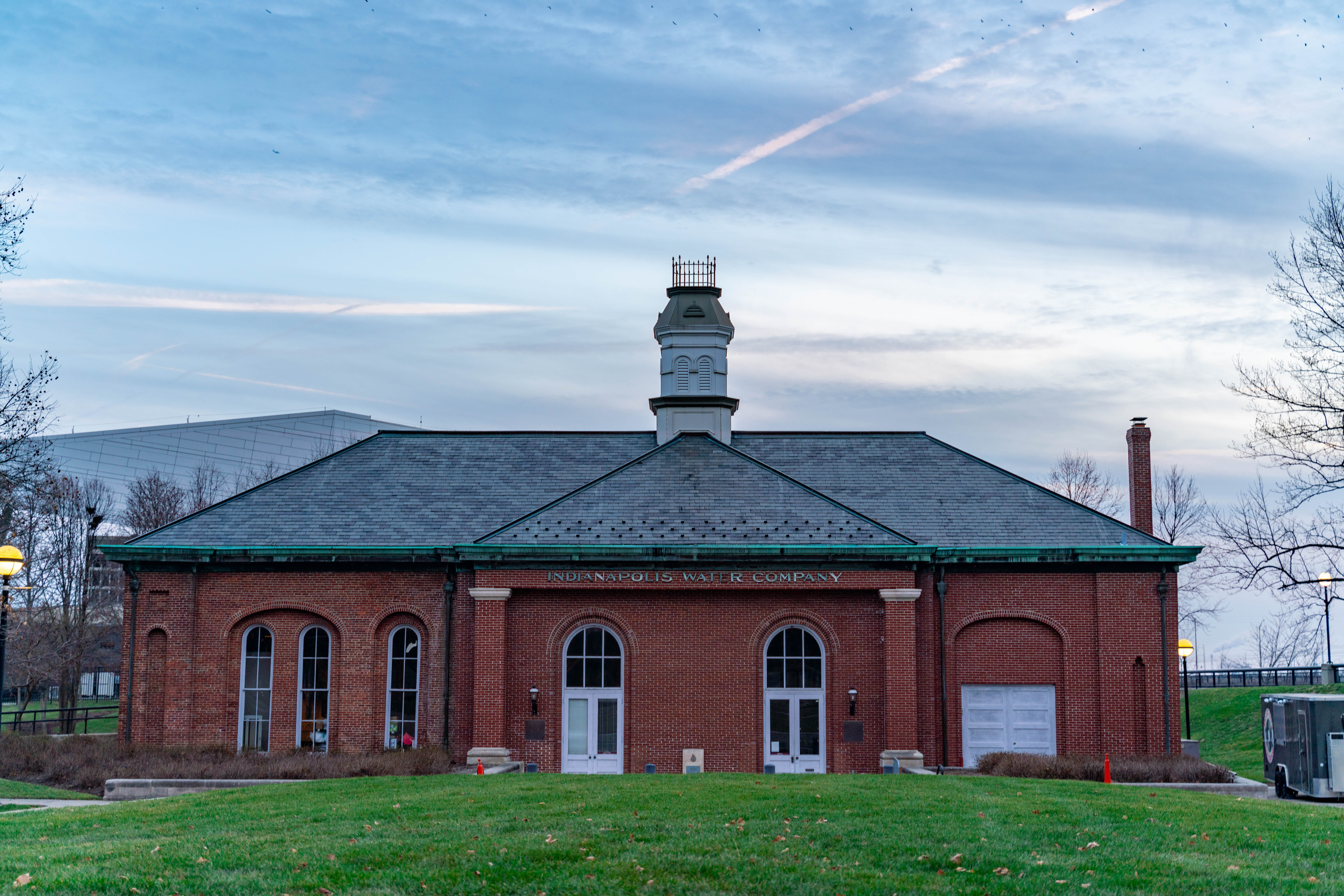

1870 – Opened as the original water pumping station for the city of Indianapolis
1969 – Pumping station closed
1980 – Accepted for inclusion on the National Register of Historic Places
1981 – Reopened as the park's headquarters and visitors' center after renovations.

- Wheel Fun Rentals
- Indiana Cross Country Arena (at the Urban Wilderness Trail)

2007 – White River State Park partners with the Indiana Invaders, Indy Greenways, Indianapolis Parks, the National Institute for Fitness & Sport (NIFS), local and international businesses, and community partners to revitalize the floodplain green space along the White River for education, health, and recreation opportunities.
2008 – Opened unofficially in August with nine meets and invitationals
2008 – Middle school (National Middle School Championships), high school (City of Indianapolis Championships), and youth (Indiana USA Track and Field Junior Olympics) teams compete
2010 – Anticipated official inaugural season in late summer
2022 – Received Lily Endowment to pave half a mile of new trail

== Trails ==
- Urban Wilderness Trail
  - Indianapolis's first Monarch Butterfly Sanctuary
  - First Certified Sustainable Trail by the Indiana Wildlife Federation
- River Promenade
- Downtown Canal
- Indianapolis Cultural Trail

== See also ==
- Indianapolis Cultural Districts
- List of Indiana state parks
- List of parks in Indianapolis
- List of attractions and events in Indianapolis
