= Indiana Central Canal =

Canal in Indianapolis, Indiana, US

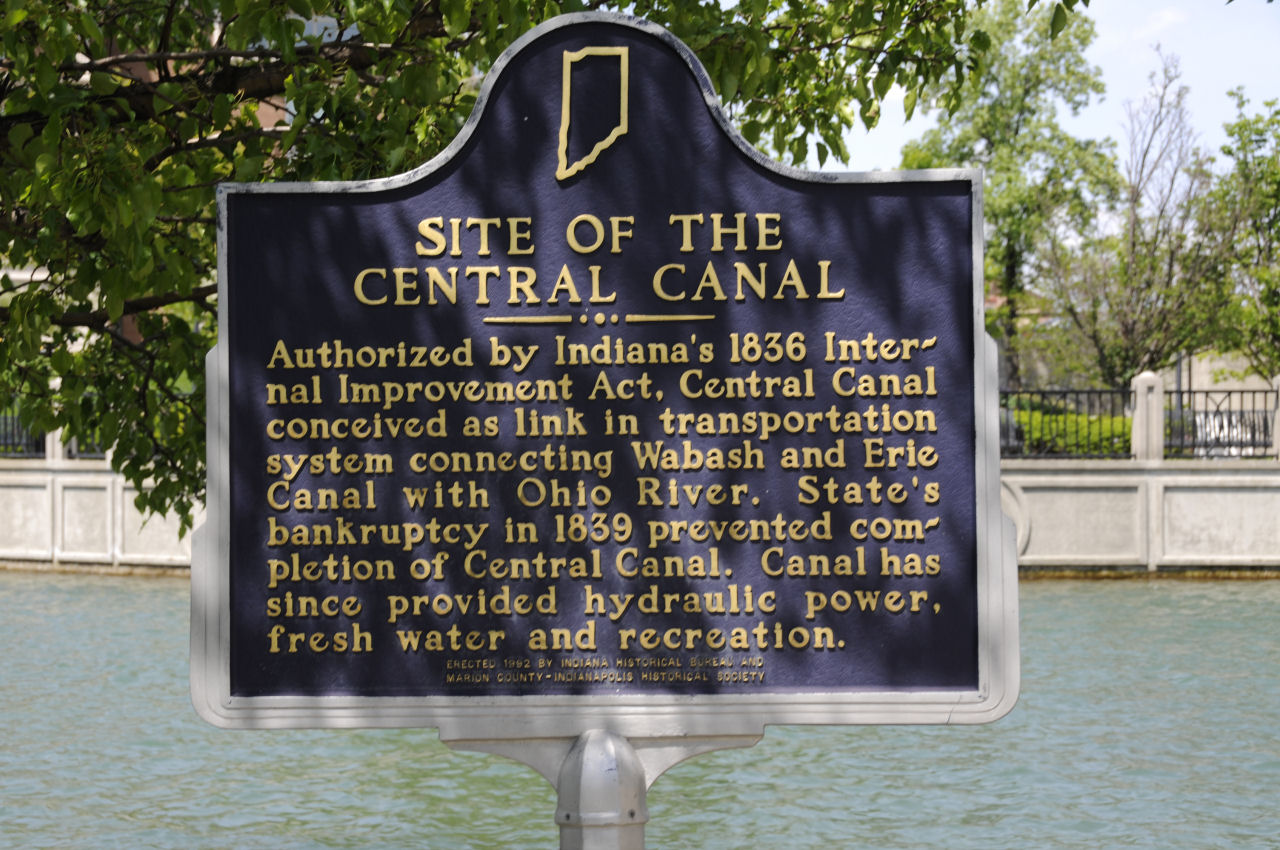
- Indiana historical marker in downtown Indianapolis in 2008

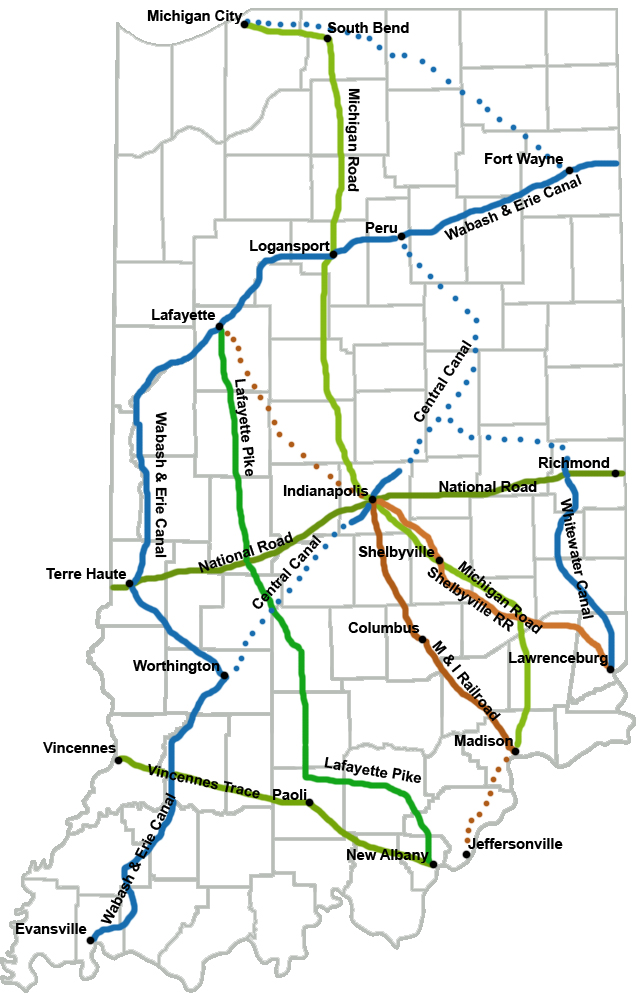
- Map showing the Central Canal and other projects of the Indiana Mammoth Internal Improvement Act
- Location: Indiana
- Country: US
- Coordinates: 39°46′15.3″N 86°09′54.75″W

Specifications
- Length: 8 miles (13 km) (originally 296 mi or 476 km)
- Status: Partially built

History
- Construction began: 1836
- Date restored: 1985–2001

Geography
- Start point: White River at Broad Ripple (originally Wabash River at Peru, Indiana)
- End point: White River at downtown Indianapolis (originally Ohio River at Evansville, Indiana)

The Indiana Central Canal was a canal intended to connect the Wabash and Erie Canal to the Ohio River. It was funded by the Mammoth Internal Improvement Act, Indiana's attempt to take part in the canal-building craze started by the Erie Canal. $3.5 million was allocated for the project, the largest piece of the entire $10 million Act. However, due to the Panic of 1837, Indiana suffered financial difficulties and had to turn the canal over to the state's creditors, and building of the canal was stopped in 1839. The canal was supposed to extend 296 miles (476 km), from Peru, Indiana, to Evansville, Indiana, where it would reach the Ohio River. It was originally divided into two sections, North and South. Later, a third section was designated, called the Indianapolis section. Only eight miles (13 km) were completed, with an additional 80 miles (130 km) between Anderson, Indiana, and Martinsville, Indiana, having been partially built.

== History ==
Prior to its construction, the canal path was surveyed by Jesse Williams, the canal engineer of Indiana. The state of Indiana already owned most of the land required for the canal. The canal was 6 feet (1.8 m) deep and 60 feet (18 m) wide.

The northern section was from Peru to Broad Ripple, Indiana. It was surveyed primarily by William Goody. It was to use the Mississinewa River to Alexandria, Indiana, and then parallel the White River. Only Delaware and Madison counties saw significant progress, which consisted of limited digging.

The eight fully completed miles (13 km) were entirely within the Indianapolis section, starting in Broad Ripple in 1836 and continuing roughly parallel the White River to downtown. Because this land was largely undeveloped and still forested, construction was difficult and slow. The section was completed in 1839.

In the last half of the 19th century, various water companies used the section to power the water system in Indianapolis, which used purified well water and not canal water. In 1904, the Indianapolis Water Company (IWC) finally took advantage of the partially built canal as a source for a purification plant. In the late 1960s, construction of Interstate 65 forced a section of the canal underground and, by 1969, the IWC had ceased using it as a source of power for its West Washington Street pumping station. Subsequently, In 1976, the IWC deeded the canal south of 16th Street to the city of Indianapolis. The city later undertook a project, beginning in 1985, to drain, rebuild, lower, and then restore water to the remaining downtown section of the canal. Some of that portion of the Central Canal is now within White River State Park and runs through the Indiana Government Center.

The southern section was from Port Royal (now Waverly) to Evansville. It was primarily surveyed by Francis Cleveland. The twenty miles (32 km) attempted were in Vanderburgh and Warrick counties.

The Central Canal Towpath of Indianapolis follows along a portion of the completed eight miles. Paved with compacted stone it runs from Broad Ripple to Burdsal Parkway near Riverside Park and passes by Butler University and the Indianapolis Museum of Art. South of I-65, the 3.4-mile (5.5 km) long Indianapolis Canal Walk parallels the canal as a linear park. This section of trail is a multi-use pathway on both sides of the canal that passes many cultural sites with pedestrian bridges connecting the two sides.

Six species of turtle populate the Indianapolis section and are studied to see how urban environments affect wildlife.

In 1971, the canal was designated by the American Water Works Association as an American Water Landmark.

== Gallery ==
Skyline of downtown Indianapolis from the canal with the Medal of Honor Memorial and Indiana State Museum on the sides

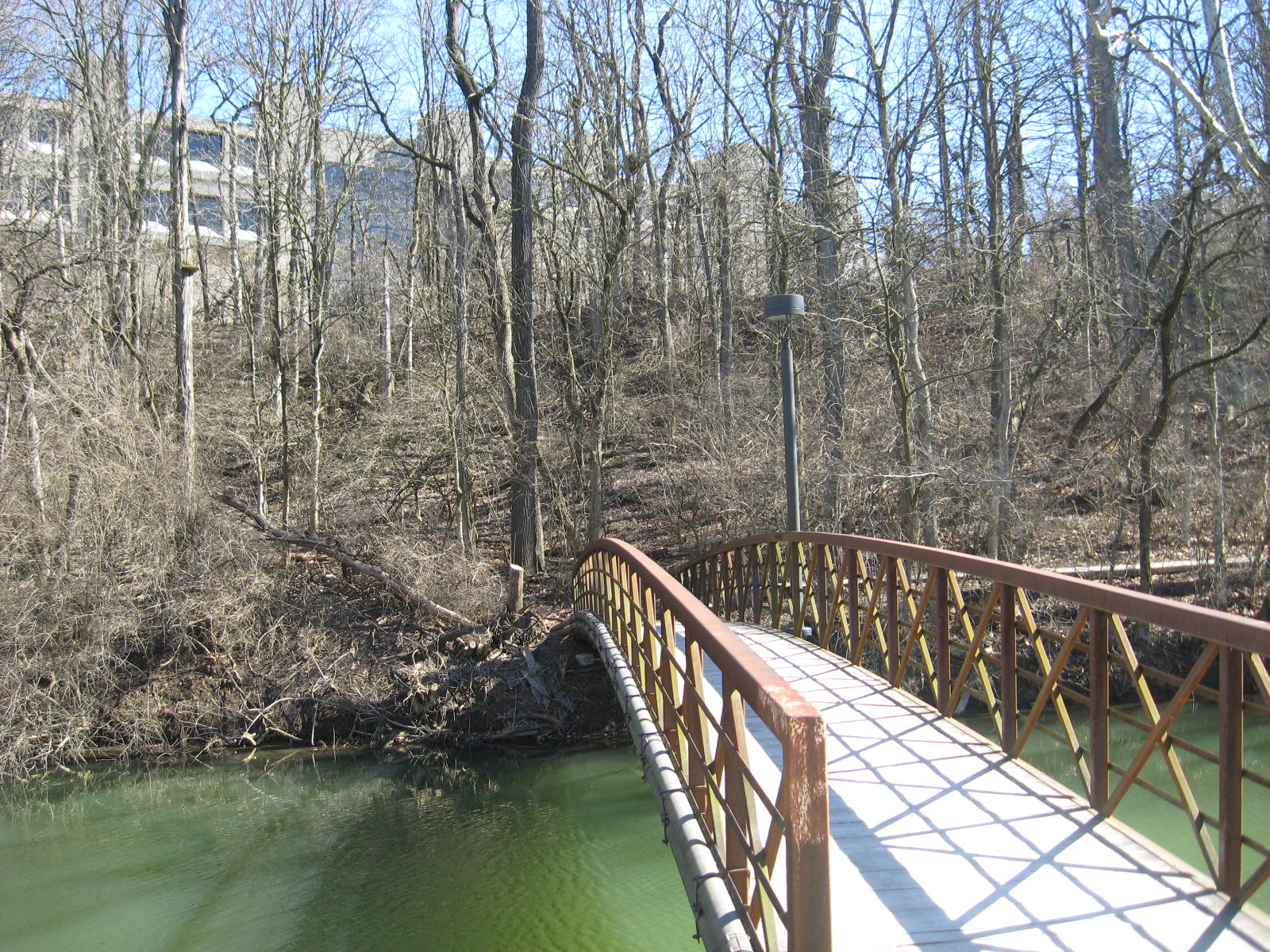
Bridge over the canal at Butler University

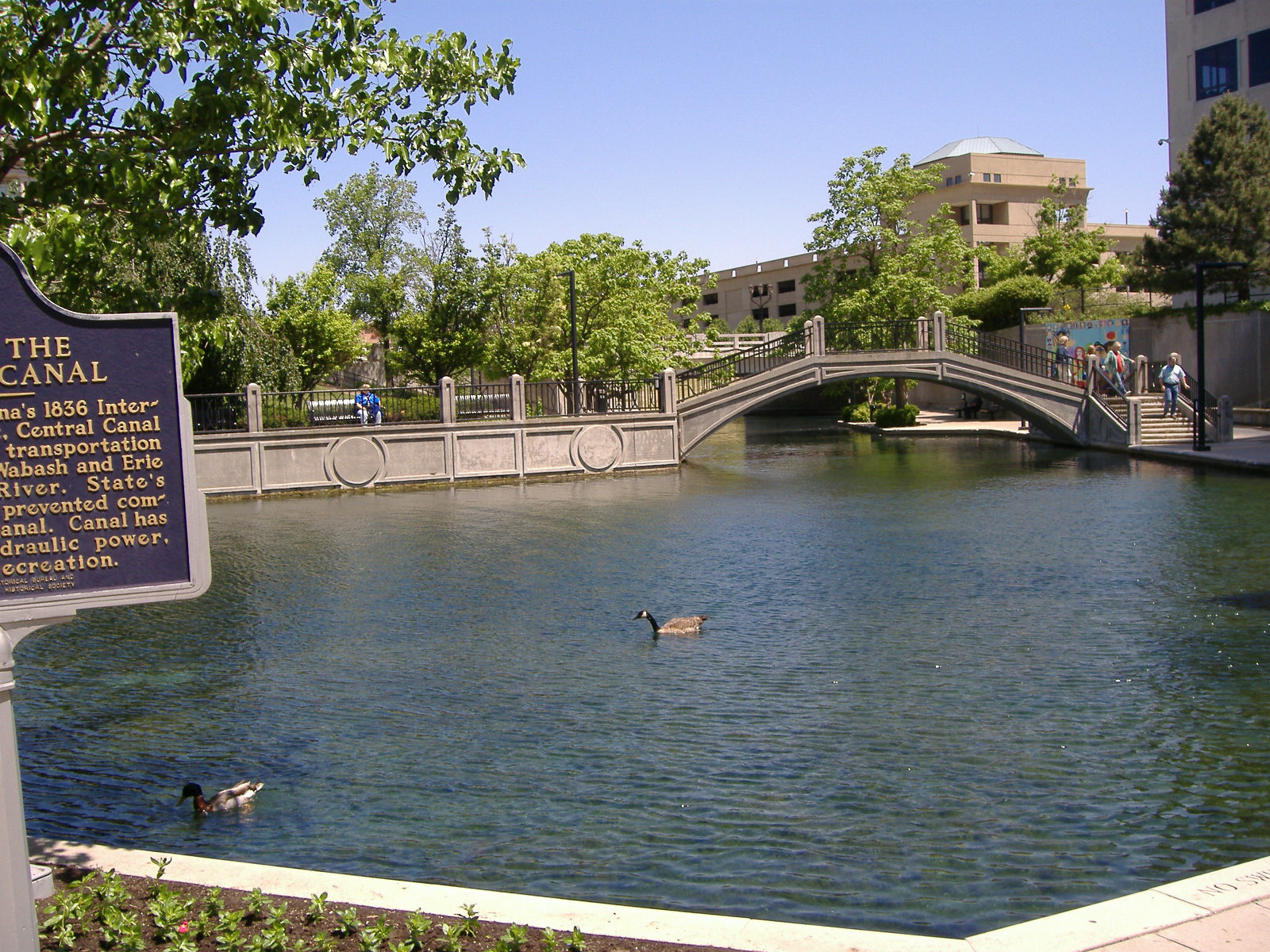
Closeup of the canal

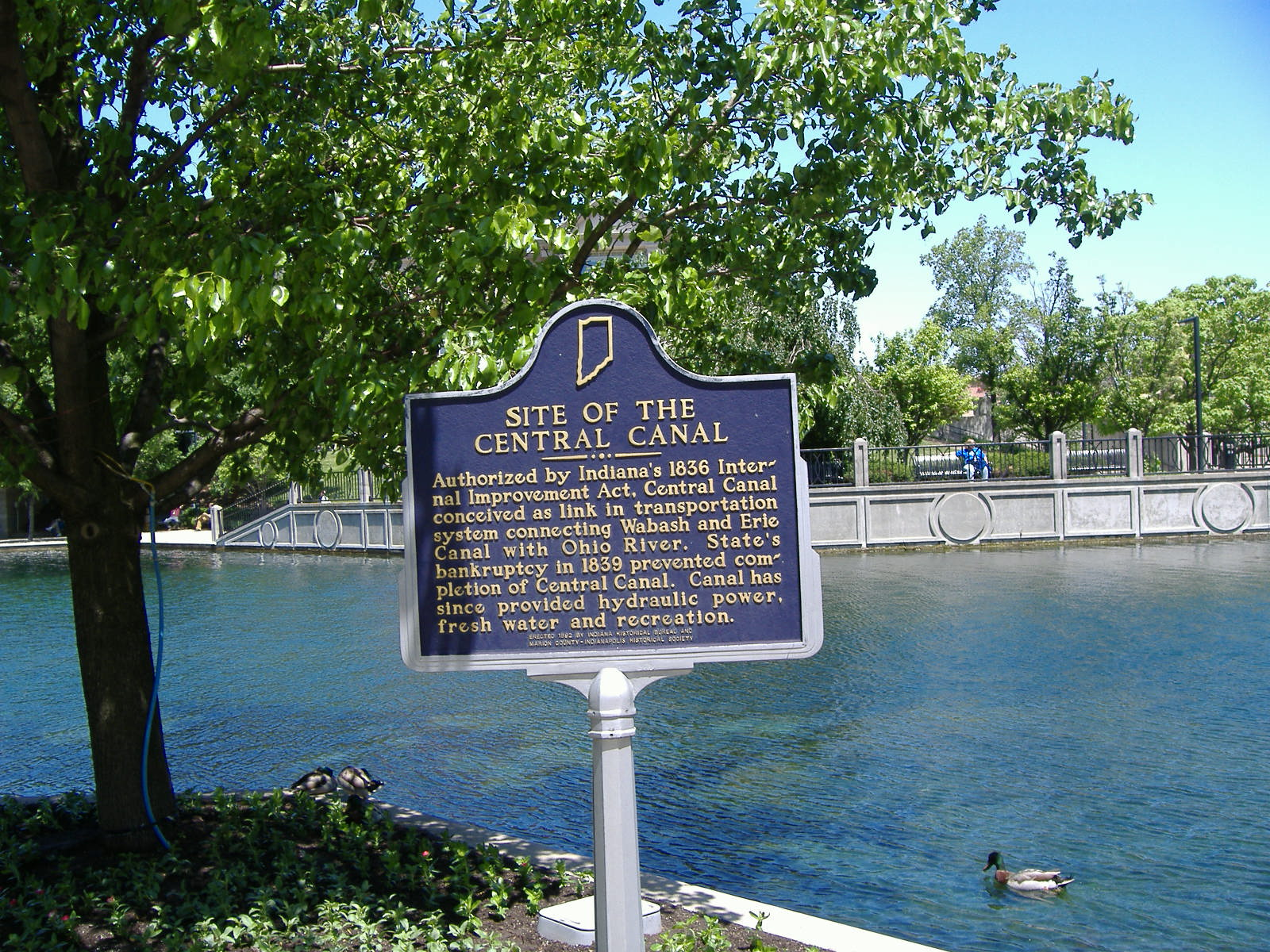
Historical marker by the canal in downtown Indianapolis

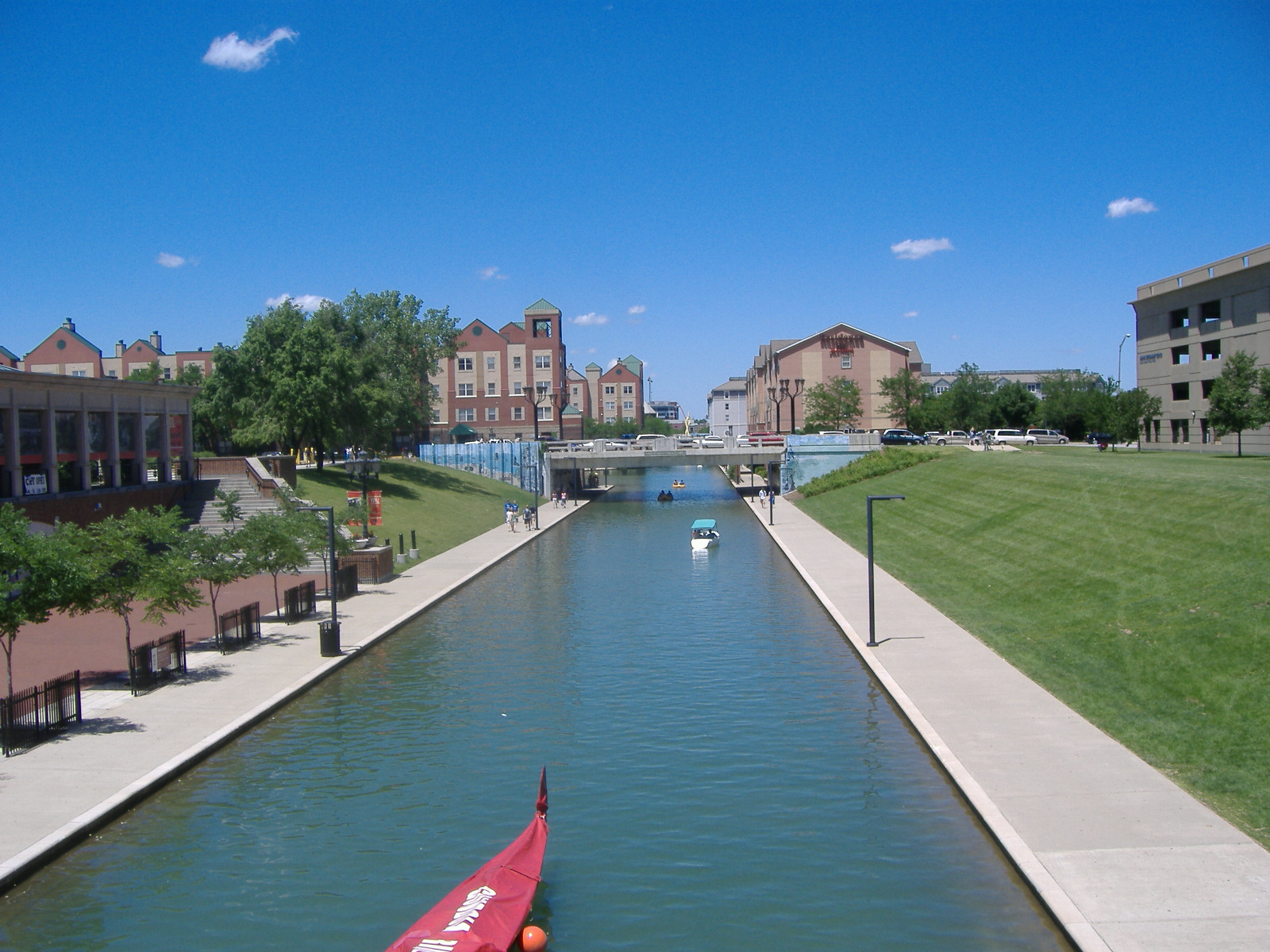
The canal as it passes the Indiana Historical Society

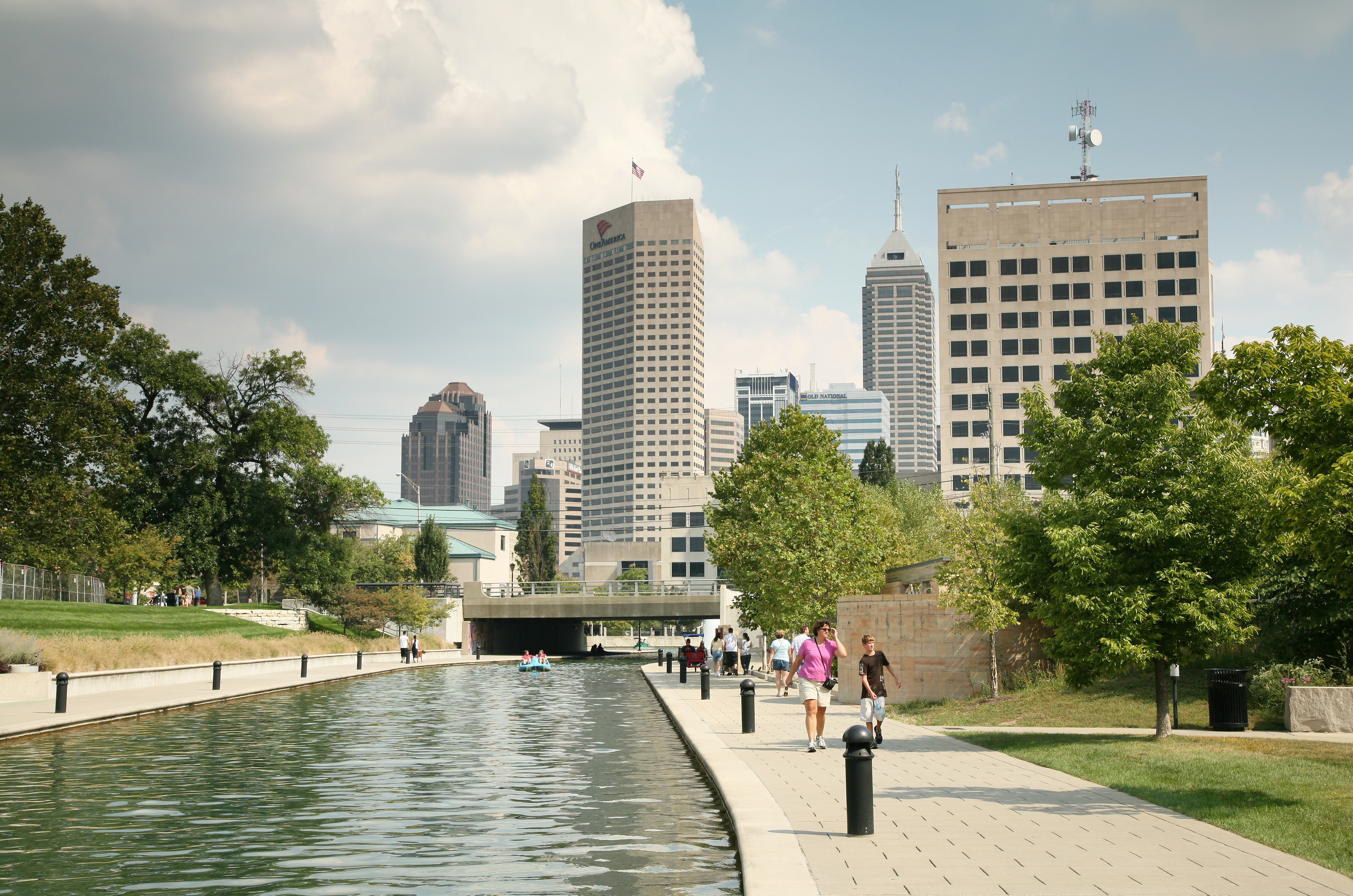
View of downtown skyline from the canal

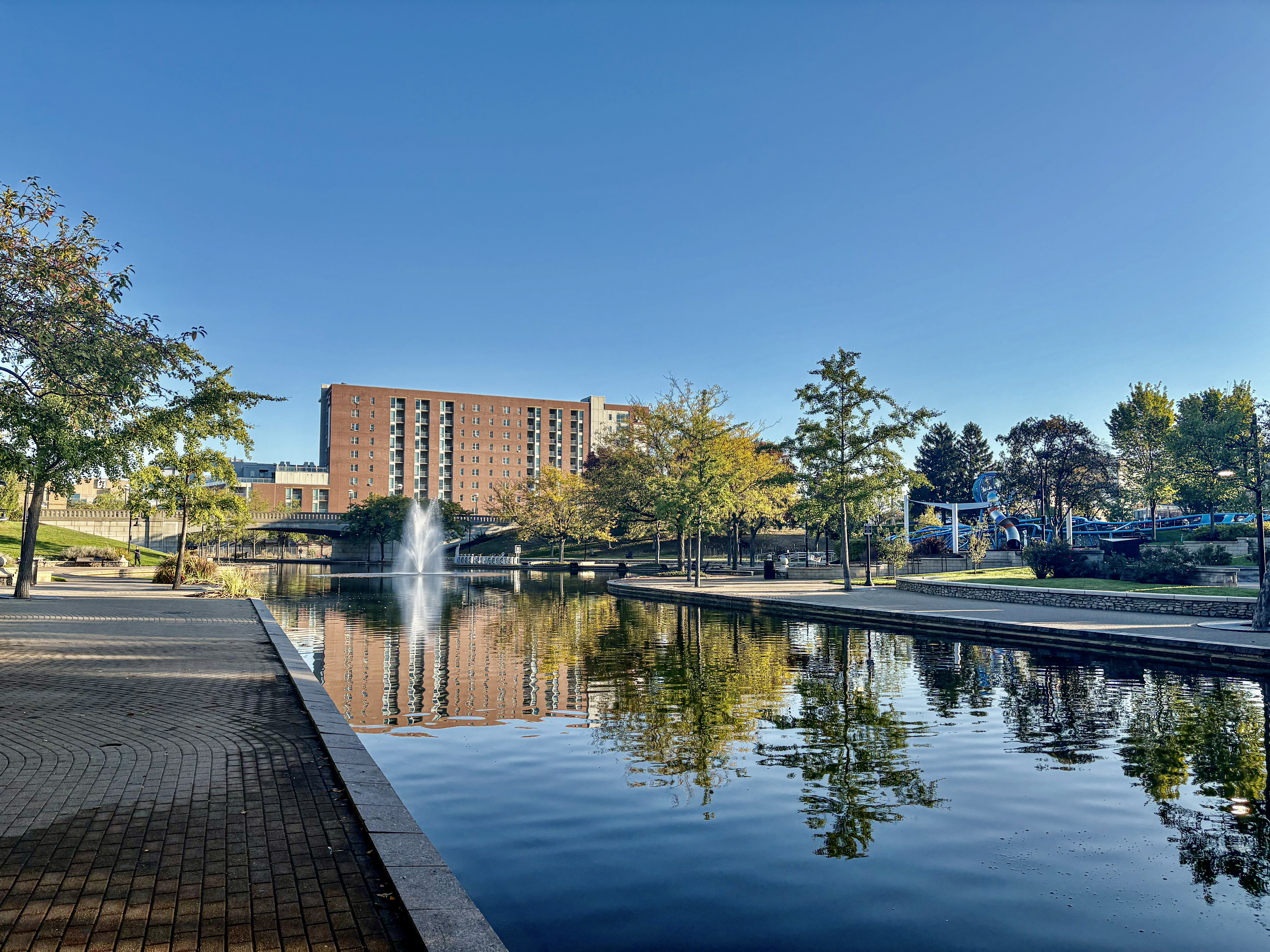
The canal near its northern end with the water fountain in the distance

== See also ==
- Transportation in Indianapolis
