= Riverside Park (Indianapolis) =

Municipal park in Indianapolis, Indiana, US

Riverside Regional Park
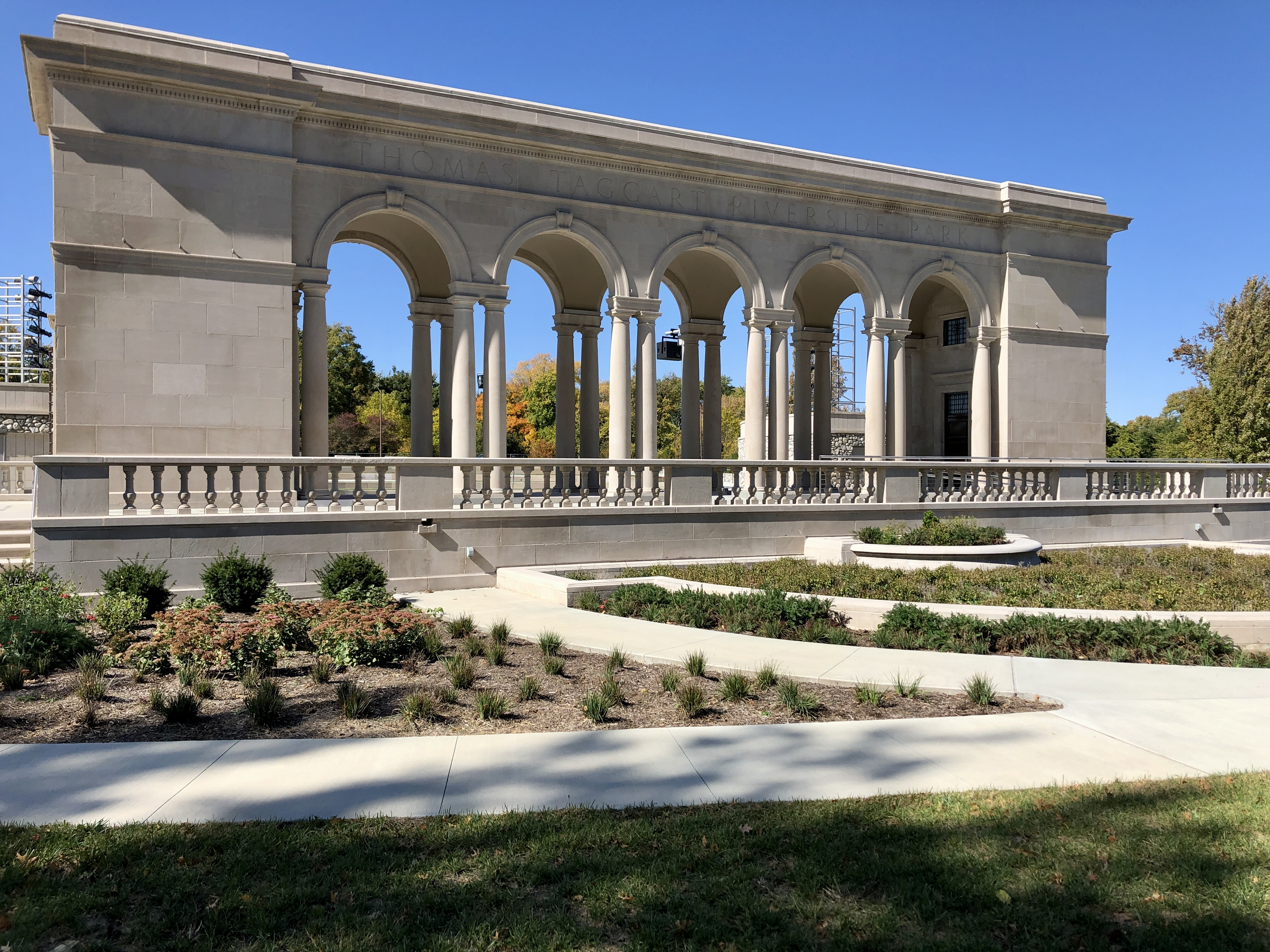
- Taggart Memorial Amphitheatre in 2022

- Location within Indianapolis
- Type: Urban park
- Location: 2420 E. Riverside Dr., Indianapolis, IN 46208
- Coordinates: 39.804976°N 86.193495°W
- Area: 862 acres (349 ha)
- Created: 1898
- Operator: Indy Parks and Recreation
- Open: All year
- Website: Riverside Regional Park
- Riverside Regional Park
- U.S. Historic district – Contributing property
- Part of: Indianapolis Park and Boulevard System (ID03000149)
- Added to NRHP: March 28, 2003

Riverside Regional Park is an urban park located on the near northwest side of Indianapolis, Indiana, United States. The park is bounded by 38th Street to the north, 18th Street to the south, Riverside Drive to the east, and Cold Spring Road to the west.

== History ==
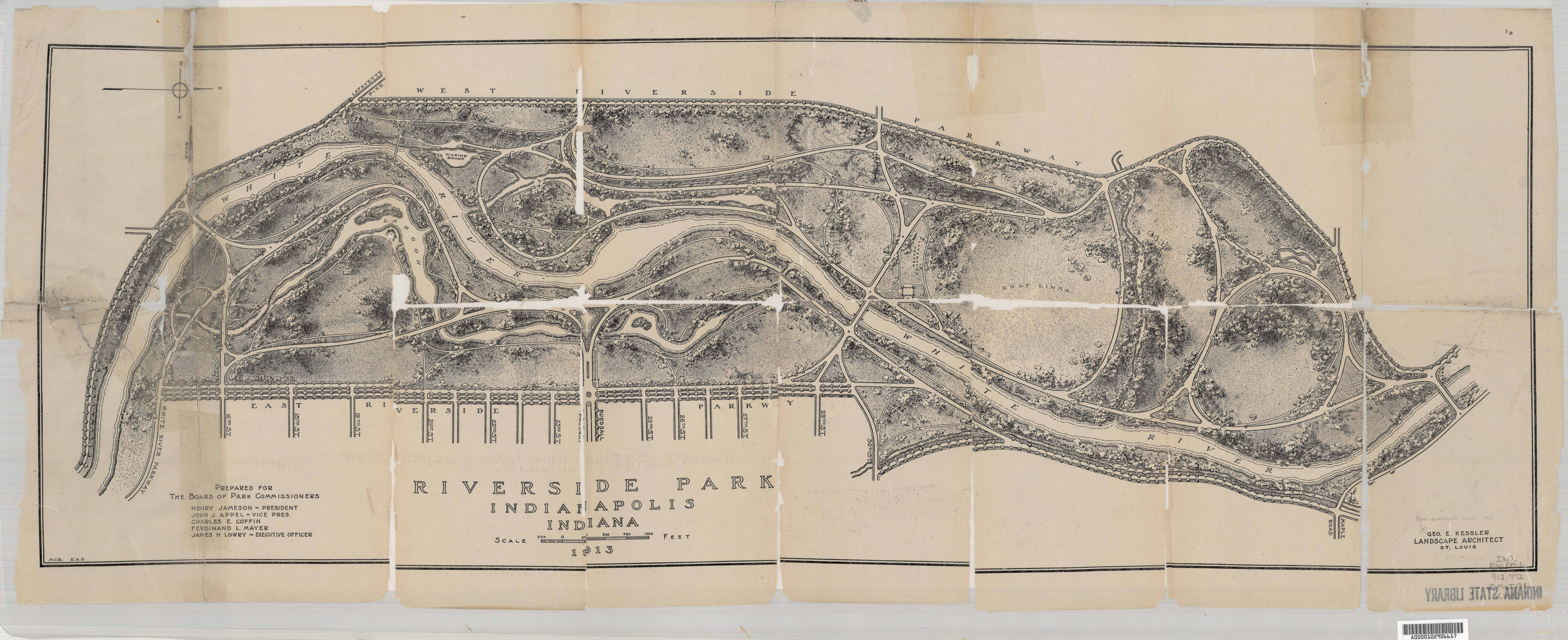
Landscape architect George Kessler's 1913 plan for Riverside Park

The area now occupied by Riverside Park was developed for agricultural use beginning in the 1820s. The area along the White River became a popular recreation space during the last half of the nineteenth century and several privately owned parks opened along this corridor. In 1898, the Board of Park Commissioners and Mayor Thomas Taggart negotiated the purchase of large tracts of land around Indianapolis to form new park and parkway systems in the northwest and northeast parts of the city. Originally designed by J. Clyde Power and George Kessler between 1898 and 1913 as part of the Park and Boulevard System for the city, Riverside Park was one of the largest municipal parks in the United States. It would remain the largest park in Marion County until the creation of Eagle Creek Park in 1972.

Investment in Riverside Park declined after World War II and many facilities were demolished and never replaced while others suffered decades of neglect. Interstate 65 was built through the park in the 1960s, destroying some of its popular recreational spaces. Riverside Park was listed in the National Register of Historic Places in 2003 as a part of the Indianapolis Park & Boulevard System Historic District.

== Current amenities ==
=== Golfing facilities ===
==== Riverside Golf Course ====
Address: 3502 North White River Parkway West Drive

The nine-hole Riverside Golf Course opened in 1900 as Indianapolis’ first municipal golf course. It was expanded to an 18-hole course in 1902. Sited along the White River, the course has mature trees, elevation changes and is the home of "Old Smokey," a 440-yard, par four which ends on a significantly elevated sloping green.

==== South Grove Golf Course ====
Address: 1800 West 18th Street

South Grove Golf Course, the closest 18-hole golf course to the downtown area, was built in 1901 as the second 9-hole golf course in Riverside Park. It was expanded to 18-holes in 1915 and a two-story brick clubhouse with a wraparound porch, locker rooms, a refreshment stand, and a second-floor assembly hall was built in 1916. The course was free and open to the public.

The name of the course came from the grove of trees that lined the south side of the park on which the course is now located. The grounds included a lagoon with a rustic footbridge. The lagoon was located along the west side of the course and was largely filled in during the 1990s. Another clubhouse was built around 1990 and the original clubhouse was demolished in 1994.

==== Coffin Golf Course ====
Address: 2401 Cold Spring Road

In 1903, the private Highland Golf Club was organized to lease the southwest part of Riverside Park for use as a golf course. The City of Indianapolis leased the land to the club, allowing them to construct a 9-hole golf course and a clubhouse that would eventually become public property. The golf course and clubhouse opened in 1904 and a lease renewal in 1908 included space for expansion to an 18-hole course. Upon the expiration of the final lease in 1921, the property became a municipal golf course.

The property has operated as a municipal golf course since 1921 and was known as the Charles E. Coffin Golf Course by 1924, honoring Charles E. Coffin (1849–1934), a real estate developer, long time member of the Board of Park Commissioners, and the director of numerous community organizations. The present clubhouse was built around 1962. The course was redesigned and rebuilt in 1995.

==== Riverside Golf Academy ====
Address: 3702 North White River Parkway West Drive

In 1898, Park Superintendent Power established a nursery for the propagation of thousands of trees, shrubs, and flowers for the city's park system. The 75-acre (30 ha) nursery was part of a system with the Garfield Park Conservatory, which propagated flowers and tropical plants. During World War I, land adjacent to the nursery was developed as a victory garden, raising produce that was sold at cost. The nursery was eliminated in 1994 and the Riverside Golf Academy was built on the site. The academy is a PGA recognized practice range.

=== Sports venues ===
==== Lake Sullivan Sports Complex ====
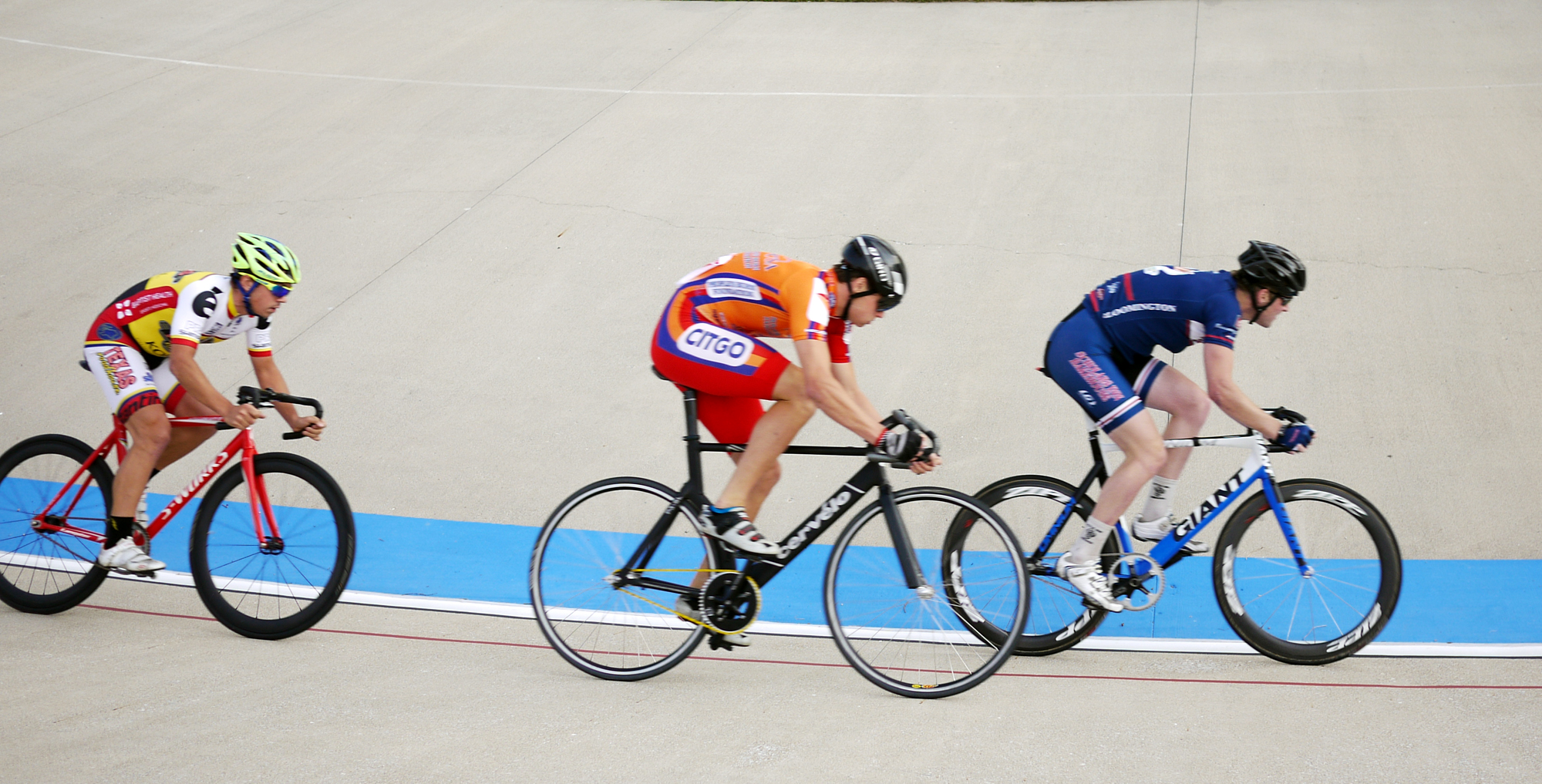
Cyclists at the Major Taylor Velodrome in 2014

Address: 3649 Cold Spring Road

As part of the Riverside Regional Park and bordered by Lake Sullivan, the Lake Sullivan Sports Complex operates as the Indy Cycloplex. The complex includes the Major Taylor Velodrome and BMX Track, which is owned by the Indianapolis Department of Parks and Recreation and operated by Marian University. The Lake Sullivan Skate Park is owned and operated by the Department of Parks and Recreation. The Cycloplex is home to an urban garden, weekly farmers' market, daily programming, and more.

==== Wilbur Shaw Soap Box Derby Hill ====
Address: 3001 Cold Spring Road

The Wilbur Shaw Memorial Soap Box Derby Hill, built by the city of Indianapolis in 1953, is the nation's longest Soap Box Derby track, measuring 1,000 feet (300 m). It was renamed in 1955 following the three-time Indy 500 winner's death in a plane crash in October 1954. Shaw had been active with the Derby both locally and nationally, serving as a referee since 1938. Today, the track features a digital weighing system, laser timer, scorer's bridge, and pit area.

==== Kuntz Memorial Soccer Stadium ====
Address: 1502 West 16th Street

The Kuntz Memorial Soccer Stadium was dedicated in 1987 as a sports venue for the Tenth Pan American Games and named in honor of William F. Kuntz, a former teacher, coach, and administrator who devoted 30 years to the Catholic Youth Organization in Indianapolis.

=== Other venues ===
==== Indianapolis Canoe Club / Casino Gardens / Municipal Gardens ====
Address: 1831 Lafayette Road

The Indianapolis Canoe Club, an exclusive private country club, opened in September 1900 at the northeast corner of 30th Street and the White River, on the site of the present day Riverside High School. The club grew to about 600 members and built a new facility east of Lafayette and Cold Spring Roads during 1912–1913. The clubhouse contained a basement rathskeller pub, a main floor parlor and dining room, and a second floor ballroom overlooking the White River. The clubhouse burned in December 1916 and was rebuilt following a revised design by architect Herbert L. Bass. The club sold the facility in 1920 and new owners opened it as the Casino Gardens Jazz Club. The city of Indianapolis purchased the property in 1927 for use as a dance and music hall and sports venue, renaming it Municipal Gardens. It is now regarded as a section of Riverside Park. The building was remodeled in 1979 and c.1998 and a large addition was built to the northwest in 2004.

==== Colts Fitness Park ====
Address: 2420 East Riverside Drive

Colts Fitness Park opened to the public in September 2016. The park includes a PLAY 60 Challenge Course, 40-yard dash, and exercise equipment.

== Defunct amenities ==
=== Zoological Department 1898–1940s ===
Riverside Park housed Indianapolis’ first zoological garden, beginning in 1898 with exhibits containing eagles and foxes. In 1899, a bear pit was built into the hillside near the cold springs. The 20-foot (6.1 m) diameter pit housed two brown bears and was enclosed by stone steps and two concentric seven-foot (2.1 m) iron fences. A fenced deer park was also created in 1899 on land south of 30th Street and housed a population of deer and elk. By 1901, the zoological department also included four monkeys, pheasants, quail, owls, wolves, possums, and other animals and birds. By 1916, the zoo had added raccoons and coyotes. The zoological department had been abandoned by the 1940s.

=== Riverside Nursery 1898–1994 ===
In 1898, Park Superintendent J. Clyde Power established a nursery for the propagation of thousands of trees, shrubs, and flowers for the city's park system. The 75-acre (30 ha) nursery was part of a system with the Garfield Park Conservatory that propagated flowers and tropical plants. During World War I, land adjacent to the nursery was developed as a victory garden, raising produce that was sold at cost. The nursery was eliminated in 1994.

=== Riverside Amusement Park 1903–1970 ===
Built by a private corporation on land adjacent to the public Riverside Park, with easy access from the city via electric streetcars, Riverside Amusement Park contained roller coasters, a mirror maze, a carousel, a miniature railway, a large shoot-the-chutes ride, a skating rink, a dancing pavilion, canoe and rowboat rentals, a bathing beach with a six-story diving tower, and arcade and carnival games. The amusement park closed in 1970 and the site was redeveloped as the River's Edge subdivision between 1999 and 2006.

=== Riverside Park Shelter House / Casino 1904–1962 ===
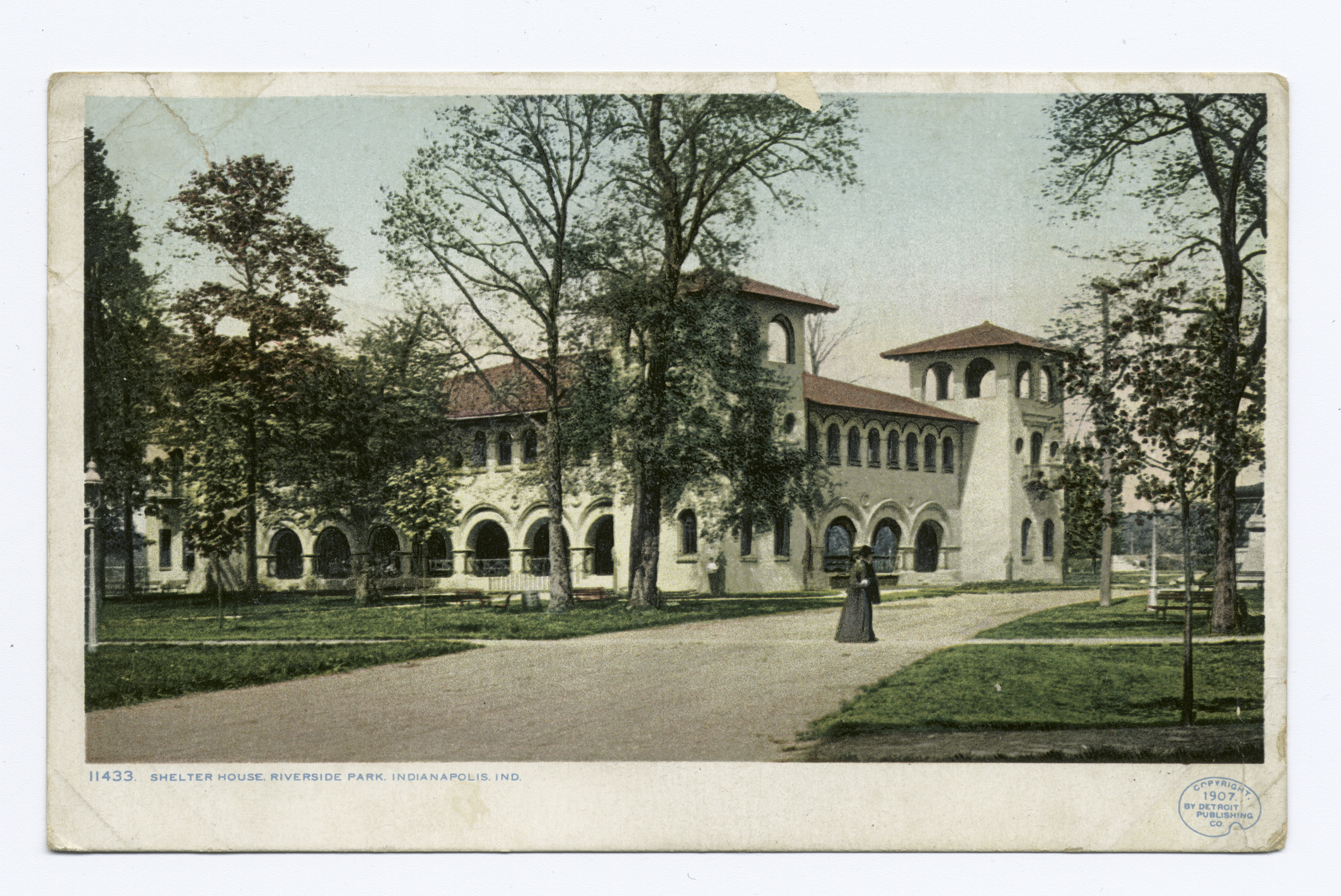
Shelter House, 1907 postcard

The Riverside Park Shelter House was designed by Park Superintendent J. Clyde Power in the Spanish Mission style and built between 1903 and 1904. The basement contained men's and women's golf locker rooms and a bicycle storage room, the first floor was an open dining and picnic room with a refreshment stand, the second floor contained an assembly room, and the roof featured four observation towers with views of the park. The building was also known as the Riverside Park Casino; the term “casino” was used for recreational pavilions and did not specifically connote gambling. The shelter house was demolished sometime between 1956 and 1962.

=== Riverside State Fish Hatchery 1910–1960s ===
In 1910, the Board of Park Commissioners leased 20 acres (8.1 ha) in the northwest part of Riverside Park to the state of Indiana for use as the Riverside State Fish Hatchery. A total of 31 ponds were built, taking water from Crooked Creek. The hatchery raised large mouth bass, bluegill, redear, crappie, and rock bass. Nine large display ponds featured a variety of fish, turtles, alligators, and other aquatic species. The hatchery was destroyed when Interstate 65 was built through the site in the 1960s.

== Points of interest ==
=== Civil engineering past and present ===
==== Emrichsville Dam ====
The Emrichsville Dam, sometimes known as the 16th Street Dam and the Riverside Park Dam, was built during 1899–1900 to raise the water level of the White River through Riverside Park and points north, making it more conducive to boating. The dam was of concrete with Bedford limestone facing. Turrets on the wing walls at either bank were designed as observatories offering views up and down the river.

The dam suffered breaches in 1908 and 1964. On October 9, 2018, it was again breached, and the damaged area was temporarily repaired with stone and gravel. Subsequently, most of the dam was removed, becoming a rapids area. On April 27, 2024, the city announced that it had received a $750,000 grant from the U.S. Fish and Wildlife Service to completely remove the dam. Removal will begin in the fall of 1926, but the so-called "Beer Castle" that anchored the east side of the dam will be retained because it has become a popular stopping point on the White River Trail.

==== Emrichsville Bridge / 16th Street Bridge ====
The Emrichsville Bridge was designed by Indianapolis City Engineer H. W. Klausmann and opened in 1906. The bridge, of steel-reinforced concrete with Bedford limestone facing, was designed as a dramatic gateway to Indianapolis from the Lafayette and Crawfordsville highways. The roadway passed below an arch flanked by two towers, providing a sense of entry into the city while marking the main entrance of Riverside Park. After World War II, traffic engineers recommended the replacement of the Emrichsville Bridge to allow for high-speed highway traffic through the area. It was bypassed by the present Sixteenth Street Bridge (1946–1948) and demolished in 1949.

==== 30th Street Bridge ====
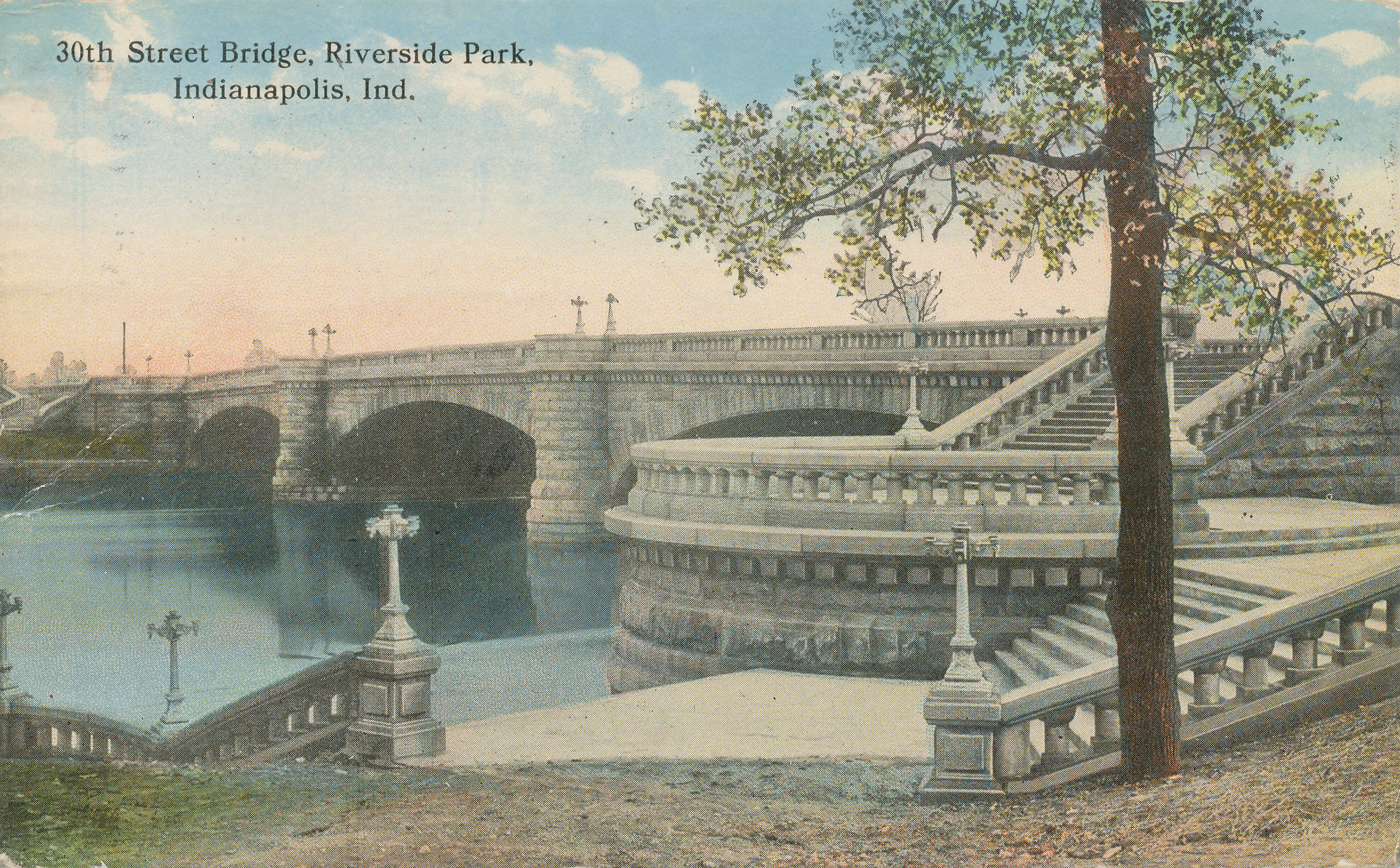
A 20th-century postcard featuring the 30th Street Bridge.

The present 30th Street Bridge was built during 1906–1907, replacing an iron truss bridge dating from the 1870s or 1880s. It was designed by H. W. Klausmann, who also designed the Emrichsville Bridge, and included similar features: a steel-reinforced concrete arch structure, Beaux-Arts style cladding in Bedford limestone, ornamental lampposts, and grand staircases leading down to the river at either bank.

==== Suspension bridges ====
Two steel suspension bridges for bicycle and pedestrian use were installed over the White River in 1901. One was located about one mile (1.6 km) below the 30th Street Bridge and the other about one-half mile (0.80 km) north of 30th Street, near 35th Street. The north suspension bridge was damaged by an ice gorge in January 1904 and it is unclear whether it was repaired or removed. The south suspension bridge was swept away by an ice gorge in February 1918 and the steel was sold for scrap.

==== Lake Reginald Sullivan ====
In 1934, the New Deal era Civil Works Administration constructed an area for nature study and habitat for waterfowl where the Crooked Creek emptied into the White River. Constructed on 20 acres (8.1 ha) just north of Riverside Golf Course, the watershed was named for Reginald H. Sullivan, mayor of Indianapolis in 1930–1935 and 1940–1943. Lake Sullivan needed to be dredged several times of years of accumulated sentiment and debris from Crooked Creek but was still a natural educational site for area schools. The construction of Interstate 65 and its bridge across the White River bisected what was Lake Sullivan leaving behind a kind of swampy wasteland that served no one. The city stocked the lake with channel catfish in 1977 and with saugeye beginning in 1983. In 1995, Indy Parks and the IUPUI Center for Earth and Environmental Science agreed to manage the park as a center for wetlands education.

=== Thomas Taggart Memorial ===
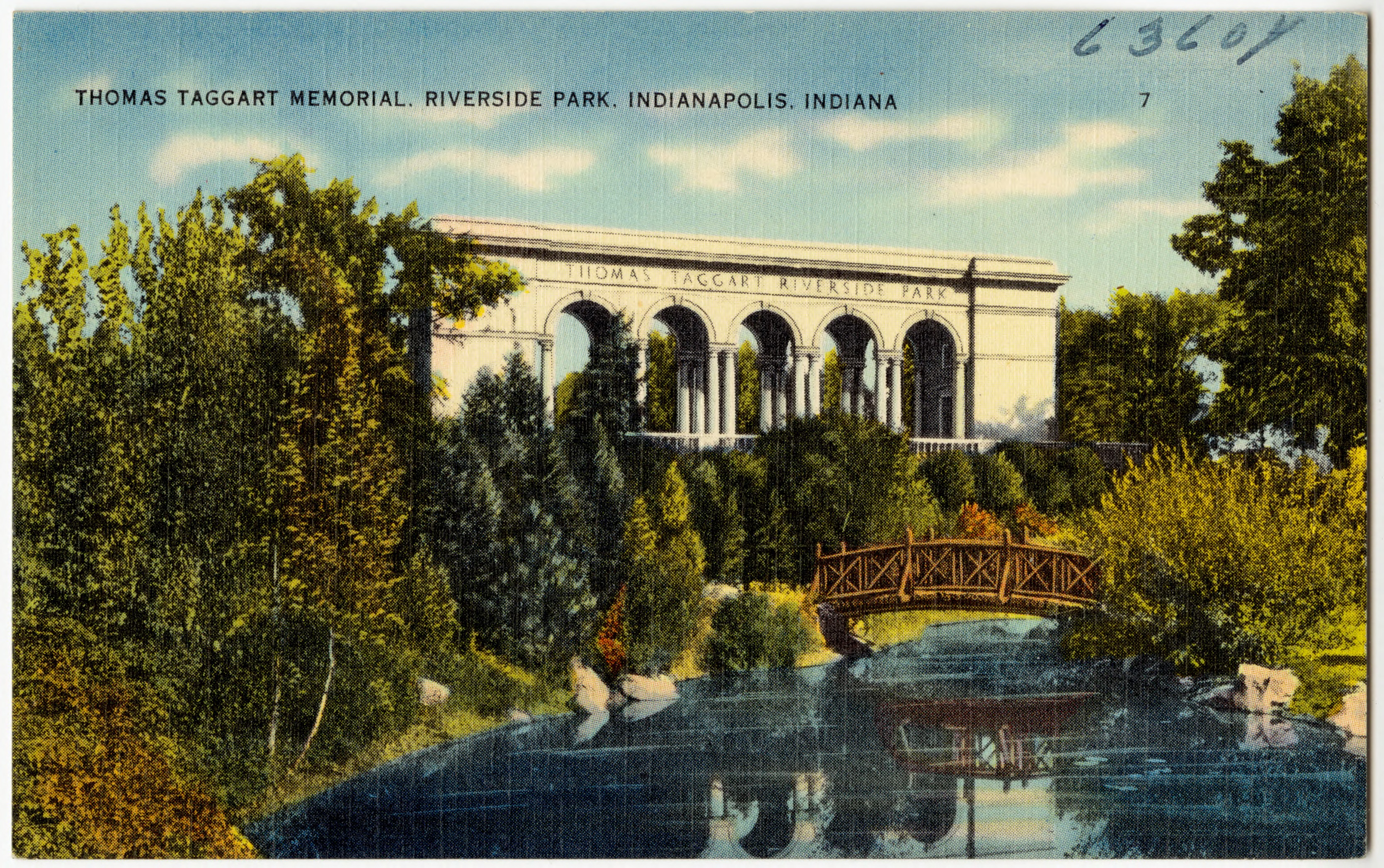
A 20th-century postcard featuring the Thomas Taggart Memorial.

In 1895, Thomas Taggart was elected mayor of Indianapolis, becoming the first Irish American to hold a major city office. Taggart was a strong advocate for the development of a city park system and oversaw the purchase of more than 1,100 acres (450 ha) of land that would become Riverside and Brookside Parks. After leaving office in 1901, he became a national figure in Progressive Era Democratic politics as well as a co-owner of the French Lick Springs Hotel. Riverside Park was formally renamed Thomas Taggart Park in 1926 and bronze signs were installed at all 16 park entrances proclaiming the name “Tom Taggart Park”. It is unclear when the park's name reverted to Riverside Park.

Following Taggart's death, community leaders commemorated his legacy of public service and as the father of Indianapolis’ park system through a neoclassical memorial colonnade in the park. Designed by Carleton B. McCullough with Burns & James in association with landscape architect Lawrence Sheridan, the neoclassical pavilion served as an ornament to the park while commemorating Taggart's role in the creation of the park system. The Taggart Memorial was dedicated in 1931. After the 1930s, the Taggart Memorial suffered from neglect and from alterations to the landscape contrary to the park's master plan. The reflecting basin was drained in 1940, and Sheridan's planting scheme was eliminated after World War II. In 1994, the north half of Burdsal Parkway, the main entrance drive, was removed and the south half was realigned. These changes left the Taggart Memorial isolated on one side of the new drive, severely damaging the formal entrance to Riverside Park and the carefully designed processional experience.

In January 2019, the city announced a plan to restore the memorial and incorporate it into a new outdoor amphitheater featuring terraced seating for 650 with additional lawn seating. The project is being partially paid by a $9.2 million grant from Lilly Endowment, of which $4.2 million is for restoration of the memorial, $4.5 million is for construction of the amphitheater (including dressing and storage rooms and perimeter fencing), and $510,185 is for programming and sustainability. The Indianapolis Shakespeare Company will become a permanent tenant of the amphitheater upon its completion in 2020. In addition, Bursdal Parkway will be rerouted to a configuration similar to the one it had before the 1994 changes, splitting to pass on either side of the memorial. The project will also be the culmination of efforts by the Indiana Landmarks, which had placed the memorial on its Ten Most Endangered Landmarks lists in 2011 and 2012 and had obtained funds to reroof and stabilize the structure a few years ago, but had been unable to undertake further restoration until a sustainable use for it could be found.

== See also ==
- List of parks in Indianapolis
- List of attractions and events in Indianapolis
