= Pogue's Run =

Waterway in Marion County, Indiana, US

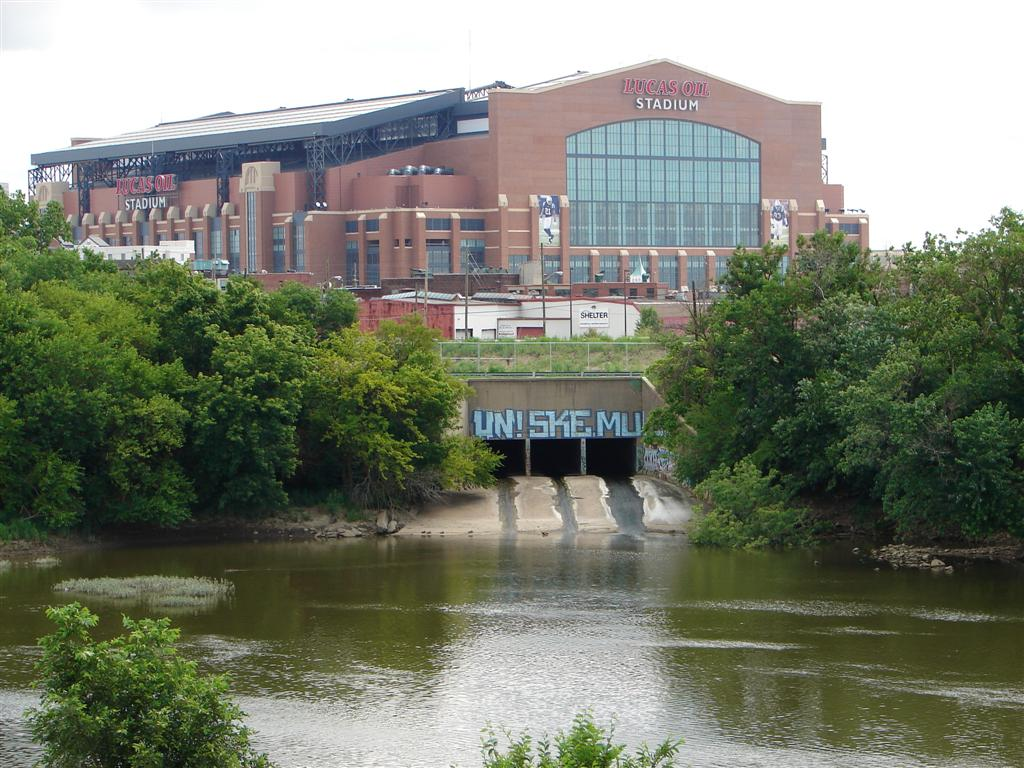
- Pogue's Run emptying into the White River southwest of Lucas Oil Stadium

Physical characteristics
- Source
  - location: Elizabeth Street and Lennington Drive, Indianapolis, Indiana, USA
  - coordinates: 39.827856°N 86.050765°W
  - elevation: 849 ft (259 m)
- Mouth
  - location: White River south of the Kentucky Avenue bridge
  - coordinates: 39.75619°N 86.17228°W
  - elevation: 675 ft (206 m)
- Length: 11 mi (18 km)
- Basin size: 13 sq mi (34 km^{2})

Pogue's Run is an urban creek that starts near the intersection of Elizabeth Street and Lennington Drive on the east side of Indianapolis, Indiana, and empties into the White River south of the Kentucky Avenue bridge over that river. At the stream's intersection with New York Street just east of downtown Indianapolis it enters a double-box culvert conduit through which it flows underneath downtown Indianapolis. It is named for George Pogue, who, along with John Wesley McCormick, were among the first settlers in what would become the city of Indianapolis. Construction of the Pogue's Run Trail along the creek's eastern section has been started.

== History ==
Prior to the arrival of Pogue and McCormick, Native Americans and wildlife would often follow Pogue's Run as a pathway. George Pogue (c.1763–1821) was a blacksmith from Connersville, Indiana. In 1819, he blazed a trail that corresponds with the present-day Brookville Road. On March 2, 1819, he built a cabin for his family of seven where Michigan Street currently crosses Pogue's Run. However, there is some disagreement among historians about these events; Jacob Piatt Dunn wrote in his 1910 work Greater Indianapolis, that Pogue actually arrived on March 2, 1820, and moved into a cabin that had been built in 1819 by a Ute Perkins, who had left before Pogue arrived. Perkins reportedly had left the area because of his loneliness, later settling in Rush County, Indiana.

The creek became known as Pogue's Run after Pogue disappeared in April 1821; it had been called Perkin's Run (after Ute Perkins) prior to Pogue's disappearance.

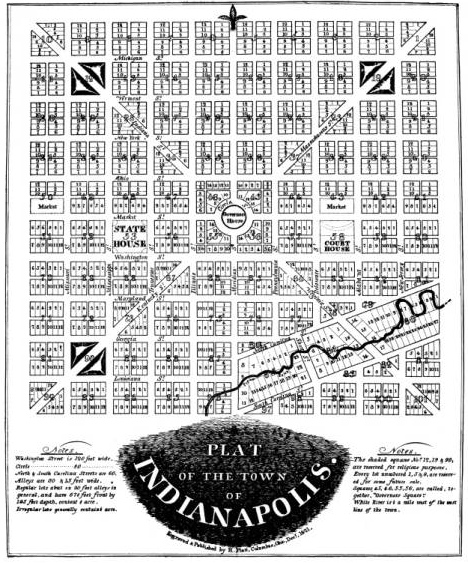
Original plat of Indianapolis by Alexander Ralston, with Pogue's Run in the southeast section

When Indianapolis was laid out, only Pogue's Run running diagonally across the southeast portion of the "Mile Square" disturbed the orderliness of the grid pattern. Alexander Ralston had to make compromises due to the stream's location within the congressional donation lands given for the future Indianapolis. Before the state government could be moved to Indianapolis from Corydon, fifty dollars was spent to rid swampy Pogue's Run of the mosquitoes that made it a "source of pestilence".

In the so-called Battle of Pogue's Run on May 20, 1863, during the American Civil War, several Democrats leaving the state party convention on the railroad running parallel to Pogue's Run threw various firearms and knives into the creek because Union troops were looking for contraband weapons. Two decades later, in 1882, the stream flooded, killing at least ten people. A covered bridge that once crossed Pogue's Run was eventually destroyed.

By the early 1900s, the creek had become more of a nuisance than an asset to the city due to flooding, public health risks from diseases, and the unsightly and unpleasant smell due to years of sewage and industrial pollution. Various solutions were considered, such as rerouting, dredging and channeling, and sewering, but nothing was decided. Action was finally taken when the various railroads that passed through the city wanted to elevate the tracks downtown to eliminate conflicts with other forms of transportation, which would require lowering Pogue's Run so surface roads could cross it. In 1911, the city and the railroads decided to enclose the creek in a sewer. The city wanted the railroads to fund 75% of the project, while some of the railroads expected the city to pay for it all. On November 26, 1913, the city's Board of Public Works adopted plans for the project and advertised for bids with the due date being less than two weeks away on December 8. The new mayor-elect, Joseph E. Bell, filed a lawsuit to prevent the contracts from being awarded, stating that the process was unduly hasty and the request for bids had been advertised in only one commercial newspaper that was not widely circulated even in the city. After the injunction was granted, the city (with Bell as mayor) re-advertised for bids in the spring of 1914; by that time it had been agreed that the city, the railroads, and the county were share the cost of the project.

The contract for what became known as the "Pogue's Run Drain" or the "Pogue's Run Improvement" was awarded to the Dunn-McCarthy company of Chicago for their bid of $907,000, which was a few hundred thousand dollars less than the city engineer had projected, although the final cost was well over $1 million. The creek would enter a double-box culvert near New York and Pine streets on the east side of downtown and pass through downtown. The stream originally ran southwest after crossing Meridian Street south of the Mile Square and joined the river near what is now the intersection of Morris and West streets about 1/2 mile (0.80 km) further south. The project cut a new route more directly west to the river, thereby shortening Pogue's Run. Construction began on July 17, 1914, at the White River near McCarty Street. On June 5, 1916, the Board of Public Works reported the project was "practically finished", but construction continued until November of that year. In 1926, an addition to the drain was built for the section nearest the stream's outlet into White River.

On the section immediately to the northeast of where Pogue's Run enters downtown Indianapolis, Spades Park and Brookside Park were built to take advantage of the creek as a recreation opportunity.

== Today ==
Indy Parks established the Pogue's Run Trail alongside the creek bed on the section northeast of downtown. New sections of trail are being planned for construction to connect the Pogue's Run Trail to downtown. As of August 2020, approximately two miles (3.2 km) of disjoint sections of the planned 5.3-mile (8.5 km) trail have been completed. The trail will run from the Monon Trail at 10th Street along the creek to the Pogue's Run Art and Nature Park a few blocks west of Emerson Avenue. A major impediment to completion of the project is the Nowland Avenue bridge across Pogues Run that connects Spades Park and Brookside Park. The bridge, built in 1909, is currently closed due to its dilapidated condition. It is a concrete Luten arch bridge designed by local engineer Daniel B. Luten. It is on the state of Indiana's inventory of historic bridges and is a component of the Indianapolis Park and Boulevard System district on the National Register of Historic Places. Neighborhood groups are leading efforts to rehabilitate the bridge and complete the trail.

Wildlife found on the path include ducks, geese, and red-winged blackbirds, with herons sometimes seen as well. Goose excrement is a particular problem for those who hike along Pogue's Run.

A project named "Charting Pogue's Run" marks where the creek once ran in downtown Indianapolis. A blue line, made of thirty permanent steel medallions and a semi-permanent blue thermoplastic line, "meanders" across roads and parking lots. The blue line's location shows that Pogue's Run now lies under both Lucas Oil Stadium and Gainbridge Fieldhouse.

== In popular culture ==
The movie Twice Under (1987) about a Vietnam veteran "tunnel rat" terrorizing a city was partially shot in the underground portion of Pogue's Run between New York and Washington streets. The underground portion of Pogue's Run is a significant feature in Ben Winters' 2016 book, Underground Airlines, and in John Green's 2017 book, Turtles All the Way Down.

== See also ==
- List of rivers of Indiana
