= Indianapolis Park and Boulevard System =

- U.S. National Register of Historic Places
- U.S. Historic district
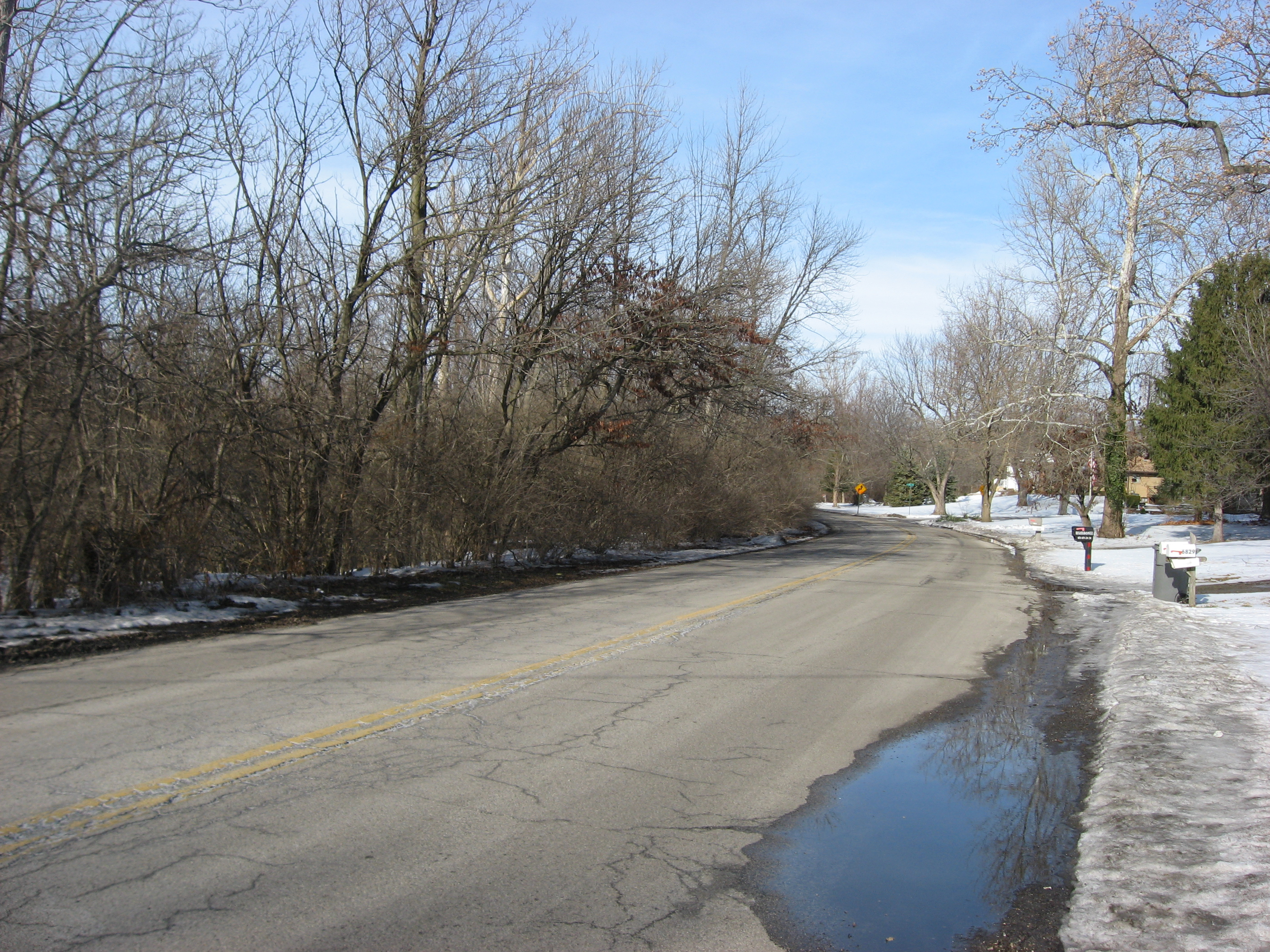
- E. Pleasant Run Parkway South Drive viewed from 16th Street

- Location within Indiana Location within the United States
- Location: Roughly bounded by 38th Street and Emerson, Southern, and Tibbs Avenues, extending on Fall Creek and Pleasant Run Parkways to Shadeland Avenue in Indianapolis, Indiana
- Area: 3,474 acres (1,406 ha)
- Built: 1898
- Architect: George Edward Kessler; Lawrence Sheridan
- Architectural style: Beaux Arts, City Beautiful
- NRHP reference No.: 03000149
- Added to NRHP: March 28, 2003

The Indianapolis Park and Boulevard System is a group of parks, parkways, and boulevards in Indianapolis, Indiana, that was designed by landscape architect George Edward Kessler in the early part of the twentieth century. Also known as the Kessler System, the district includes 3,474 acres (1,406 ha) and has shaped the city through the present day. This historic district was added to the National Register of Historic Places in 2003.

== Components ==
The Park and Boulevard System consists of a number of components comprising 3,474 acres (1,406 ha) in an area roughly bounded by 38th Street and Emerson, Southern, and Tibbs Avenues with extensions on Fall Creek and Pleasant Run Parkways to Shadeland Avenue.

Twelve parks within these boundaries with a total area of more than 1,118 acres (452 ha) are individually listed properties of the district. Riverside Park (including South Grove, Coffin, and Riverside Golf Courses), Garfield Park, and Brookside Park are the large parks in the plan; Rhodius Park and Willard Park are neighborhood parks; and Fletcher Park, Highland Park, Indianola Park, McCarty Triangle Place, and Noble Place are small parks. University Park and Military Park in downtown are included in the district, although both had previously been separately added to the National Register of Historical Places.

Several other parks are included as components of a parkway: Spades Park as part of Brookside Parkway; Fall Creek and 16th, Watkins, Barton, Fall Creek and 30th parks and Woolens Gardens as parts of Fall Creek Parkway; and Orange, Christian, and Ellenberger parks along with the Pleasant Run Golf Course as parts of Pleasant Run Parkway.

Six parkways extending for 34.8 miles (56.0 km) and containing 2,153.5 acres (871.5 ha) link the various parks and major city streets. The parkways are Fall Creek (from I-465 to White River), White River (from 38th Street to the confluence of Pleasant Run), Brookside (from Brookside Park to Fletcher Park at Brookside Avenue and 12th Street), Pleasant Run (from Shadeland Avenue to White River), Ellenberger, and Burdsal. Two boulevards are also part of the system: Maple Road (now named 38th Street) from Fall Creek to White River, and Kessler Boulevard from 38th to 56th Street and from Cooper Road to Fall Creek Parkway.

The district contains several stone and stone-clad decorative bridges over Fall Creek, White River, and other streams. Some of these carry major streets, such as the Capitol Avenue, Meridian Street, and Illinois Street bridges over Fall Creek, and the 30th Street bridge over White River. Others span smaller streams within the parks, such as the Crooked Creek bridge in Riverside Park and the filled spandrel concrete foot bridge in Brookside Park over Pogue's Run.

The historic district includes 29 contributing sites, 20 contributing buildings, 109 contributing structures (other than buildings), and 7 other contributing objects. Most of the contributing buildings are within the parks, but some, such as the Heslar Naval Armory located on the White River just north of Riverside Park, are not.

== History ==
=== Background ===
In its first 40 years, Indianapolis did not see much need for organized park land because the pastures and other open areas in and near the still small town were easily accessible by the inhabitants. As the city gained population during and after the Civil War, the desire for parks grew. In 1864 the city took operative control of state-owned Military Park, University Square, and the Governor's Circle after previously rejecting, during the preceding five years, offers of various citizens to donate land to be developed as parks.

The land that would become Brookside Park was purchased by the City Council in 1870, and in 1873 Southern Park, later renamed Garfield Park, was acquired. However, neither site was developed until the 1880s, when citizens working at times privately and at other times in conjunction with the city, began to make improvements.

=== Early plans ===
In 1894 the Commercial Club, which later became the Chamber of Commerce, hired Joseph Earnshaw, a landscape architect from Cincinnati, Ohio, to develop a park plan for the city. He recommended construction of a boulevard lined with parks running along the White River and Fall Creek from Washington Street to the Indiana State Fairgrounds, but this plan was rejected as too extravagant.

The next year (1895) the Parks Board, which had been established under auspices of state legislation initially drafted by the Commercial Club, hired John Charles Olmsted, stepson of Frederick Law Olmsted Sr., to develop a plan for future parks. His plan was similar to Earnshaw's, with a focus on the waterways and including boulevards, small parks, and several large regional parks. However, opposition soon arose, especially from the south and east sides of the city because those areas would not benefit from the new park system even though they would be taxed for it. In 1897 the state law enabling the creation of the Parks Board was declared unconstitutional; a new law was enacted in 1899, but the controversy over the plan continued.

Despite the opposition to the Olmsted plan, the city under Mayor Thomas Taggart purchased 1,100 acres (450 ha) of land during the early 1900s, including much of what became Riverside Park. That park, however, had not been envisioned in Olmsted's plan. Construction of boulevards along the streams was also begun, with sections of Fall Creek Boulevard between Capitol and Central Avenues and of Pleasant Run Boulevard between Raymond and Beecher Streets being completed by 1906; boulevards along the east side of White River north of Michigan Street and through Riverside Park were also being built.

=== George Kessler's plan ===
By 1907 the Parks Board realized that it needed a new comprehensive plan, and from 1908 to 1915 it engaged George Edward Kessler as a consulting landscape architect. Kessler was already well-known, having created plans for Kansas City, Missouri, in 1892 and Cincinnati, Ohio, in 1907. He had also planned the grounds of the 1904 Louisiana Purchase Exposition in St. Louis, Missouri. Kessler had already been hired by the city to plan a boulevard system. In 1909, after a year of study, Kessler presented his Park and Boulevard Plan combining the ideals of the City Beautiful Movement with practical functionalility. That same year he helped to obtain the passage of a new state law that allowed the Parks Board to levy taxes for the purchase and improvement of parks.

Kessler retained many of the elements of the Earnshaw and Olmsted plans, including the linear parks and boulevards along White River and Fall Creek. However, his plan was much more far-reaching in scope, encompassing all the open public land in the city. Parkways would follow the four major watercourses in the city - White River, Fall Creek, Pleasant Run, and Pogue's Run - taking advantage of the meandering streams, open vistas, and wooded areas that the city's geography afforded. Besides their aesthetic aspects, the parkways also helped prevent pollution of the waterways and provided flood control. Kessler's plan also linked the boulevards with major city streets, including Meridian Street, Washington Boulevard, and Maple Road (now 38th Street), with those streets also being beautified.

Decorative stone-clad arched bridges spanning White River and Fall Creek are an important component of Kessler's plan. Several of these predate the plan, having been designed by City Engineer J. Clyde Power to replace existing iron bridges. Kessler himself designed a new bridge on Capitol Avenue over Fall Creek.

By including all sections of the city in his plan, Kessler was able to overcome many of the objections raised by residents whose areas had been overlooked by the earlier plans. Moreover, the 1909 law which he had championed provided for differing tax rates for the various sections of city, depending on the scale of park improvements in each section.

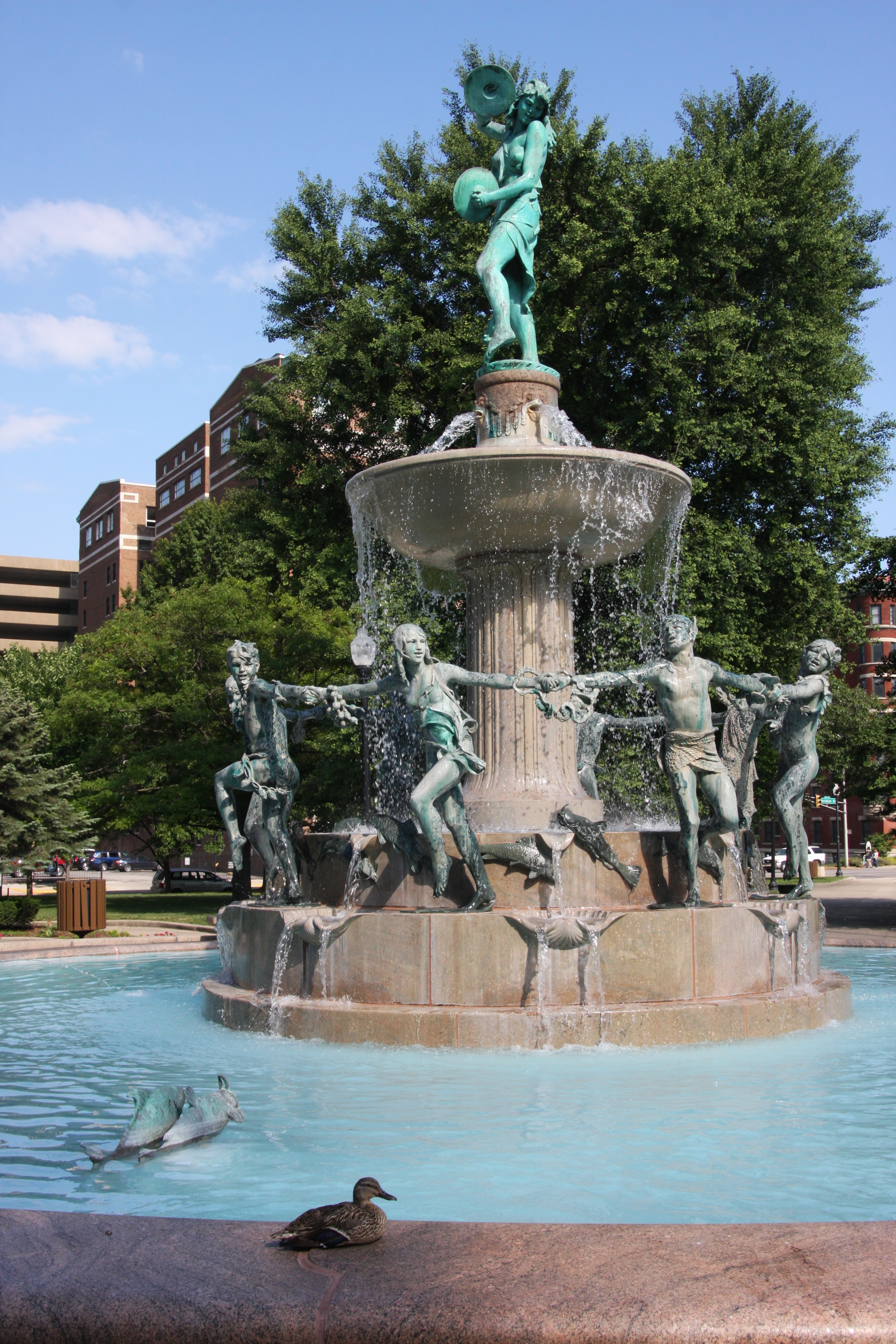
Depew Memorial Fountain in the center of University Park

Kessler and his firm created designs for several of the existing and new parks within his plan, including University Park in 1914, Garfield Park in 1915, and Riverside Park in 1916. The plan for Garfield Park is one of the few complete park plans created by Kessler during his career. Kessler gave each major park in the plan its own character. For example, he created formal sunken gardens for Garfield Park, retained the large stands of trees in Ellenberger Park, and recommended a large central fountain with formal pathways for University Park.

The effect of Kessler's plan began to be seen immediately. For example, Dr. Henry Johnson, who became chairman of the Park Board in 1908, persuaded the leaders of St. Vincent Hospital to move the location of the proposed new hospital building several hundred yards from the banks of Fall Creek to allow space for the boulevard and improvements on the creek's banks.

The success of Kessler's plan for Indianapolis led several other cities in Indiana to engage his services. His plans for Fort Wayne, South Bend, and Terre Haute all incorporated the ideals of the City Beautiful Movement. He also advised on plans for Anderson, Evansville, Marion, and Peru.

In 1922 the Board of Park Commissioners again hired Kessler to design extensions to the boulevard system in what was then the far northern reaches of the city. He recommended that Fort Benjamin Harrison on the northeast side be connected to the northwest side of town via a 100-foot (30 m)-wide boulevard encompassing portions of Cooper Road and 56th and 59th Streets. Construction had just begun on the project when Kessler died in March 1923 in Indianapolis. In recognition of the impact and value of his plan, the city named the new parkway Kessler Boulevard in his honor.

=== After Kessler ===
By the time of Kessler's death in 1923 a large portion of the plan had been constructed. Lawrence Sheridan, who had graduated from Purdue University and attended the Harvard School of Landscape Architecture, took over as city planner for Indianapolis. He continued the implementation of Kessler's plan over the next decades. In 1928 he presented an expanded version of the plan that proposed parks and parkways throughout Marion County. Sheridan's plan envisioned parkways along most of the smaller streams within the county not already included in Kessler's plan, but those additions were generally never implemented.

Several lengthy stretches of the parkways in Kessler's plan were not completed until the 1930s. At that time projects under the Federal Emergency Relief Administration and the Works Progress Administration completed Fall Creek Parkway, Pleasant Run Parkway, Riverside Drive, and Kessler Boulevard.

=== Recent years ===
The passage of time saw the aging and deterioration of the parks and other components of the system. In the 1970s, for example, the city transferred ownership of one of the small parks along Pogue's Run, Fletcher Park, to the nearby Switzer Corporation; after that company closed, the park became neglected and fell into disrepair. In 2013 ownership was transferred to the Windsor Park Neighborhood Association, which plans to restore the park using historical elements, including a central fountain, in phases through 2015.

In the 1990s a major rehabilitation of the sunken gardens in Garfield Park was undertaken. The Indy Greenways plan has brought renewed attention to the parkways by creating trails such as the Fall Creek Greenway and Pleasant Run Greenway. In 2003 the city officially recognized the importance of the Kessler System and worked with the Indiana Division of Historic Preservation and Archaeology to document the entire 3,400-acre (1,400 ha) system and place it on the National Register of Historic Places as a historic district.

Kessler's plan has influenced the development of Indianapolis to the present day. The system of parkways and boulevards reinforced the perception that the northern and eastern sides of town were the most desirable places to live. One of Kessler's recommendations in 1909 was for a court of public buildings and green space leading west from the Indiana State House to the White River. This was realized in spirit about 80 years later with the construction of the Indiana Government South Building and the development of White River State Park.
