= Heslar Naval Armory =

- U.S. Historic district – Contributing property
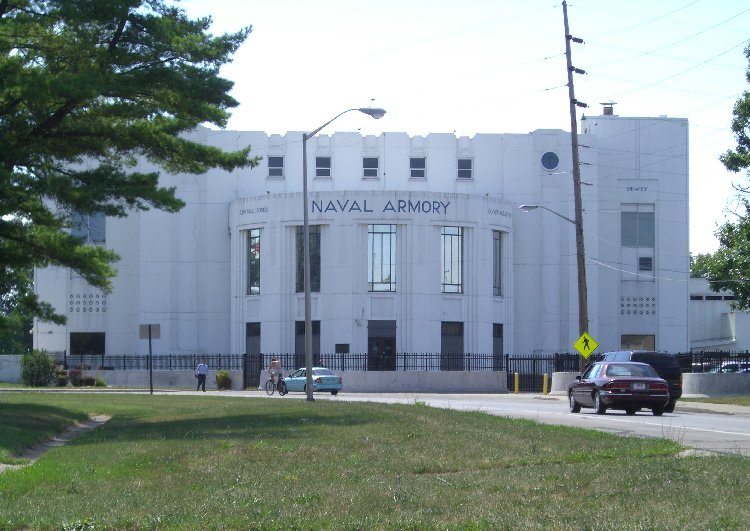
- Heslar Naval Armory

- Location within Indiana
- Location: Indianapolis, Indiana
- Coordinates: 39°48′35″N 86°11′35″W
- Built: 1938
- Architect: Ben H. Bacon
- Architectural style: Art Moderne
- Part of: Indianapolis Park and Boulevard System (ID03000149)
- Added to NRHP: March 28, 2003

Heslar Naval Armory (formerly Indianapolis Naval Reserve Armory) was constructed in 1936 in Indianapolis, Indiana, United States, on the shore of White River as a Works Progress Administration construction project. It was designed by architect Ben H. Bacon and reflects an Art Moderne style. Heslar Naval Armory was the home of Naval Operations Support Center Indianapolis, Marine Corps Reserve Center Indianapolis, and Naval Recruiting Station Indianapolis, as well as the United States Naval Sea Cadet Corps Cruiser Indianapolis (CA-35) Division and the Central Indiana Young Marines of the Marine Corps League. In October 2008 the Indiana Wing Civil Air Patrol, state branch of the US Air Force Auxiliary, moved its headquarters functions and staff to the Armory.

The building and property are legally owned by the State of Indiana and managed by the Indiana State Armory Board (an entity of the Indiana National Guard), but were leased to the federal government for use by the United States Navy Reserve and the United States Marine Corps Reserve until early 2015. The facility was converted to educational use with the opening of Riverside High School. Renovating the armory for use as a school cost $10 million, and was completed in June 2018. The school chose the Argonauts as their mascot and used the naval theme of the building in its branding to honor its history.

== History ==
Construction began on the US$550,000 project in February 1936, and the building was officially dedicated as the Indianapolis Naval Reserve Armory at a ceremony on October 29, 1938. John K. Jennings, Indiana State WPA administrator, presented the building to Elmer F. Streub, adjutant-general, who then presented it to Captain O.F. Heslar, commandant of the Indiana State Naval Reserve. Louis J. Bornstein, representing the citizen's dedication committee, served as toastmaster. Guests included Lieutenant-Governor Henry F. Schricker; Indianapolis Mayor Walter C. Boetcher; Admiral Hayne Ellis, commander of the Ninth Naval District; and representatives of the Navy Department and the Navy Reserves of several states.

Heslar Naval Armory (then Indianapolis Naval Reserve Armory) upon its dedication in 1938

The structure was built of reinforced architectural concrete with steel roof trusses. Upon completion, the four-story building included a navigation bridge, signal hoist, magazine, battle telephones, boiler room, radio communication, watertight bulkheads, ship's ladders, galley, 50-foot (15 m) swimming pool, gymnasium, rifle range, classrooms, and mess and quarters for officers and enlisted staff. The mess hall and gymnasium were decorated with 12-by-15-foot (3.7 by 4.6 m) murals depicting famous naval battles and events.

Inscribed around the rotunda and on the walls of the exterior are the surnames of several significant figures in Naval History including George H. Preble, George Dewey, Oliver Hazard Perry, John Paul Jones, and David Glasgow Farragut.

On November 20, 1939, Captain O. F. Heslar (1891–1970) took command of the armory and USS Sacramento, the gunboat aboard which the Naval Reserve force trained on Lake Michigan each summer. Captain Heslar remained in this capacity through November 1940, when he was ordered to take his ship and her crew to Boston, Massachusetts, for refitting. It was here that the vessel was transferred to the active U.S. Navy and was docked at Pearl Harbor when that base was attacked by Japanese forces on December 7, 1941. She survived the attack while shooting down at least two enemy fighters, and participated in rescue and salvage operations immediately afterward.

During World War II, the inland location was ideal when generals and admirals, seeking to avoid the constant surveillance on the coasts, gathered regularly at the armory in Indianapolis to plan their Atlantic and Pacific campaigns, including elements of the pivotal Battle of Normandy that began June 6, 1944. Throughout World War II, the Indianapolis Naval Reserve Armory remained a vital facility where radioman and yeoman recruits trained for sea duty. Following that conflict it returned to a peacetime reserve function. In 1946, the United States Marine Corps reactivated Headquarters Co. 16th Infantry Battalion for training and ordered them to Heslar. This unit was called for duty in Korea in 1950.

On December 12, 1964, the Indianapolis Naval Armory was renamed the Heslar Naval Armory in honor of its first and longest-serving commanding officer in a dinner ceremony emceed by Harry T. Ice. Mrs. Heslar was ill and unable to attend, but a tape recording was played for her later in their home in New Augusta. In attendance were Heslar's son, Lieutenant Fred G. Heslar USNR, and his wife, as well as former Indiana Governor Ralph Gates; Rear Admiral Howard A. Yeager, Commandant of the Ninth Naval District, Great Lakes Illinois; Colonel George P. Hill Jr, Commanding Officer of Fort Harrison; Commander Joseph W. Tilford, commanding officer of the Indianapolis Naval Reserve; Brigadier General John D. Friday of the Indiana National Guard; Brigadier General G. Wray DePrez Indiana National Guard (ret.), president of the Indiana State Armory Board; Brigadier General Kenneth E. Keene, assistant chief, Indiana Air National Guard; Captain James C. Wootton, commanding officer of Naval Avionics Facility; Captain Firman F. Knachel; and Captain Robert O. Jackson, commander of Indiana Naval Forces.

Unveiled at the ceremony was a plaque that is now mounted on the exterior of the rotunda and reads:

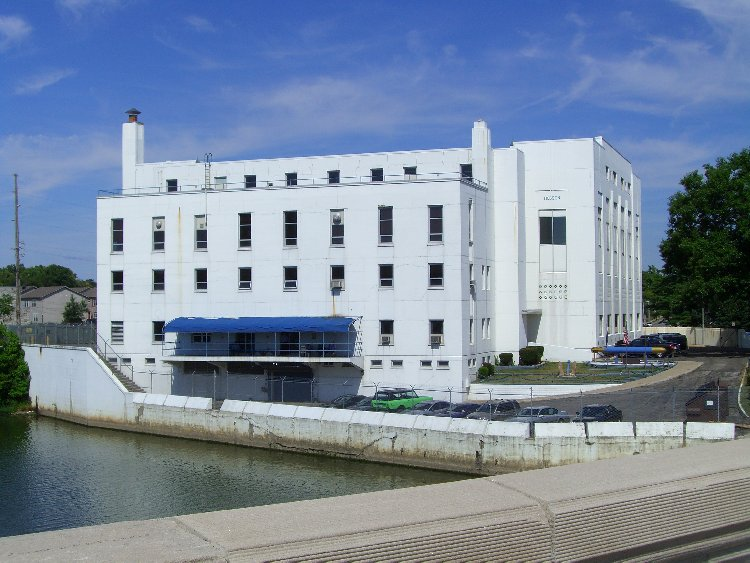
The north face of Heslar Naval Armory as seen from across White River

Heslar Naval Armory
in honor of
Captain Ola Fred Heslar, USNR (Ret.)
Commanding Officer of the Naval Reserve
State of Indiana 1921–1940

A dedicated Naval officer and true hoosier, Captain Heslar has given unselfishly of his time, knowledge, and efforts to further the Naval Reserve and the Indiana Naval Forces.

Held in the highest esteem by his fellow officers and fellow hoosiers, it is altogether fitting that this armory be dedicated and so named.

Matthew E. Welsh
Governor, State of Indiana
1964

In 1978, after the nearby Marine Reserve facility in Riverside Municipal Park was damaged, a decision was made to renovate the Armory and accommodate local Marine Reserve Components. Renovation began in 1977 with the removal of nearly all non-support internal structure and replacing them with a more modern floorplan. Also, a large parking lot was created on the former site of the Riverside Amusement Park. On November 1, 1978, the facility was re-designated as a Navy and Marine Corps Reserve Center.

In early 2015 the Navy and the Marine Corps discontinued use of the facility. Renovations to convert the armory into Riverside High School were completed in June 2018.

Heslar Naval Armory has been listed as a contributing property to the Indianapolis Park and Boulevard System, along with several other sites and buildings. The buildings together form a Historic district that has been listed on the National Register of Historic Places since 2003.

== Captain Ola F. Heslar (1891–1970) ==
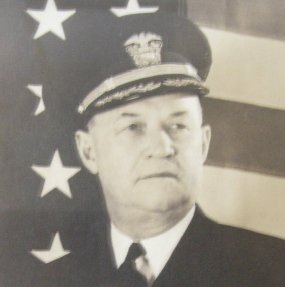
Capt. O. F. Heslar, USNR in an undated photograph

Ola Fred Heslar was born October 5, 1891, in Brazil, Indiana, to Walter and Minnie (née Rhodes) Heslar. He attended grade school in Brazil and Crawfordsville, and high school in Indianapolis. He enlisted in the U.S. Navy in 1907 and, after basic training, was assigned to a submarine in the Philippine Islands. Later, he was stationed at Norfolk Navy Yard as a radioman.

In April 1913, Heslar married Alice Marie Young of Rockland, Maine. He earned a commission in 1916 and served aboard USS Vulcan in the Mediterranean Sea and Atlantic Ocean. Next, and no doubt in reflection of his experience as a radioman, Heslar was assigned as Officer-in-Charge of the Transatlantic Radio Station in Tuckerton, New Jersey.

From 1919 until 1920, Heslar served as a staff officer under Admiral Henry Braid Wilson, Commander in Chief, U.S. Atlantic Fleet (CINCLANT), 1919–1921. He continued that duty under Admiral Hilary P. Jones when Admiral Jones accepted the post of Commander in Chief of the U.S. Atlantic Fleet in 1922.

In 1922, Capt. Heslar retired from active Navy service and entered the U.S. Navy Reserve. He was assigned to active duty as Area Commander of Indiana, and later Chief of Naval Affairs for the State of Indiana. It was in these posts that he founded and organized the Indiana Naval Forces by initiating the Indiana Naval Militia Act, which was passed into law on March 1, 1927. Also in this capacity, Capt. Heslar oversaw the construction of the Naval Armories at Indianapolis and Michigan City. Capt. Heslar set a standard that was to be followed nationwide by naval reserve training and operational facilities when he established the first naval training activities at Heslar Naval Armory. During this time, Captain Heslar was also a member of the Great Lakes Commission of Indiana, and the Indiana Board of Public Harbors.

Heslar's first wife died in August 1930, having borne no children. In 1934, Heslar remarried to Mabel Kathleen Gasaway of Indianapolis. In July 1938, Fred Gasaway Heslar, Capt. Heslar's only child, was born.

With the beginning of World War II Capt. Heslar returned to staff and combat duties serving as Director of Training, 9th Naval District, Great Lakes, Illinois and, later, on the staff of Admiral William Halsey. On May 17, 1943, Capt. Heslar was awarded an honorary doctorate of law from DePauw University. He then went on to perform postgraduate work at the Massachusetts Institute of Technology and Columbia University.

In 1944, it was announced that Captain Heslar would be promoted to rear admiral. However, due to his health, he was sent to the Mayo Clinic and forced to permanently retire from Naval Service. In 1959, he was awarded the Navy Distinguished Service Medal for exceptionally meritorious and distinguished service.

Upon returning home to Indianapolis, newly elected Republican Governor Ralph M. Gates appointed Captain Heslar to the position of Indiana State Purchasing Director, which the Captain assumed on February 1, 1945. As of January 12, 1946, he was a member of the Republican Party, the Blue Lodge Free and Accepted Masons, the Columbia Club, the Woodstock Club, and the Methodist Church.

== Commanding officers ==
Name	Dates
CAPT O. F. Heslar, USNR	1921–1940
*all reserve units activated	1940–1946
CAPT F. A. Graf, USN	1947–1949
CAPT M. C. Thompson, USN	1949–1953
CAPT J. C. Wickens, USN	1953–1956
CAPT E. B. Billingsley, USN	1956–1959
LTJG D.C. Funk, USN	1959–1960
CDR J. W. Tilford, USNR	1960–1966
CDR R. Hicks, USN	1966–1969
CDR B. Woesner, USNR	1969
LCDR J. E. Pursley, USN	1969–1972
CDR J. A. Morehead, USNR	1972–1975
CDR W. P. Stiegler, USNR	1975–1979
CDR L. E. Shafer, USNR	1979–1983

Name	Dates
LCDR P. M. Dirga, USNR	1983–1986
CDR P. V. Starnes, USN	1986
LCDR R. E. Graham Jr., USNR	1986–1989? [was listed as 1921–1940]
CDR C. A. Grover, USNR	1989–1992
CAPT V. E. Bothwell, USNR	1992–1995
CAPT M. D. Savignac, USNR	1995–1999
CAPT J. D. Harrington, USNR	1999–2001
CDR M. J. Murphy, USNR	2001–2003
CDR J. P. Steinbronn, USN	2003–2005
CDR J. T. Garry, USN	2005–2007
CDR K. McNeill, USN	2007–2009
CDR C. Ridings, USN	2009–2012
CDR R. Szemborski, USN	2012–2014
CDR B. D. Franklin, USN	2014–2016
LCDR M. Galvin, USN	2016–Present

== Artifacts ==
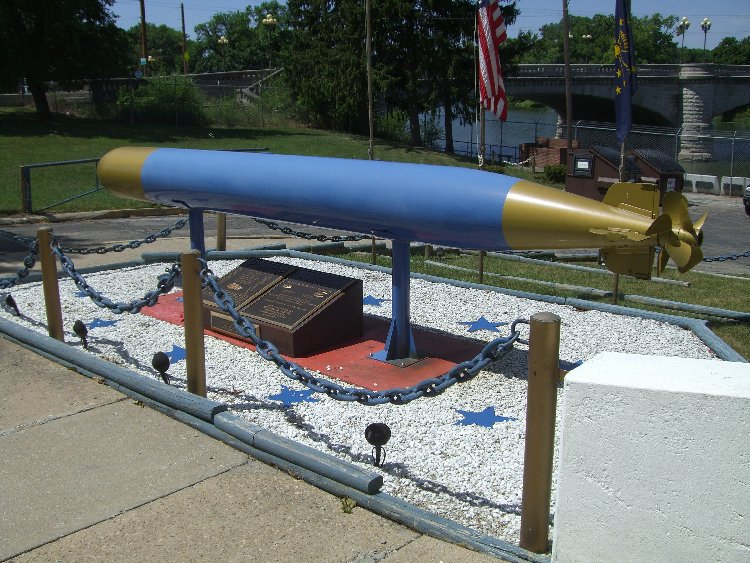
The USS Grayback (SS-208) memorial on the grounds of the Heslar Naval Armory

Heslar Naval Armory is home to several artifacts of Naval history including:

- a bell from USS Indiana cast in 1942 with the commissioning of that ship.
- a bell from USS Indianapolis cast in 1932 with the commissioning of that ship.
- a damaged flag recovered from USS Indianapolis presented to the city of Indianapolis on February 2, 1960, by the Indianapolis Council of the Navy League of the United States.
- a memorial to USS Grayback established by the Submarine Veterans of W.W.II, Hoosier Squadron. This memorial has since been removed and moved to a location unknown.
- a flag recovered from USS Fechteler, hung in the wardroom.
- a quartermaster's logbook from USS Indiana in 1943.
- original blueprints for USS Indiana.

== NOSC Indianapolis logo ==
The logo of NOSC Indianapolis

The logo for NOSC Indianapolis (then NMCRC Indianapolis) was created by QM1 Jerome (Jerry) Bennett and approved by CDR Lee Shafer in 1980. The eagle represents the US, the Hoosier homeland is represented by the state's outline. The unique nature of the WPA constructed building represents the peacetime home of the reservist. The ship's wheel is for guidance, and the anchor for stability – both values central to Navy Reserve Training.

When I designed the logo I was acutely aware of the heraldry and symbolism that is a part of such things as the Great Seal of the United States and countless other symbols from uniform patches to icons carved into significant architecture. I wanted to do something that deserved to remain for a time.

I had visited the museum in the basement of Soldiers' and Sailors' Monument on the Circle at the center of Indianapolis and picked up a brochure from their information rack. One of the artifacts on display on a mannequin was an enlisted Naval Uniform from the War of 1812. The Eagle atop my Naval Reserve Center logo is an exact copy of the eagle on that uniforms rating badge. If you examine it closely you can tell that my model was embroidered.

The representation of the building was deliberately distorted to give depth to the rotunda; the dominant feature of the building as viewed from the east or main entrance.

If you follow the curve of the southern border of the state outline, the Ohio River, to the area of Madison, Indiana, you will notice an unusual symbol on the wooden wheel. It looks like a letter J and a letter B stuck together so that the two vertical strokes are combined. That is my mark which I incorporated into the original artwork.

— QMC Jerry Bennett, 2013

Rear Admiral G. Beaman tours NOSC Indianapolis in August 2007.
