= Brookside Park (Indianapolis) =

Municipal park in Indianapolis, Indiana, US

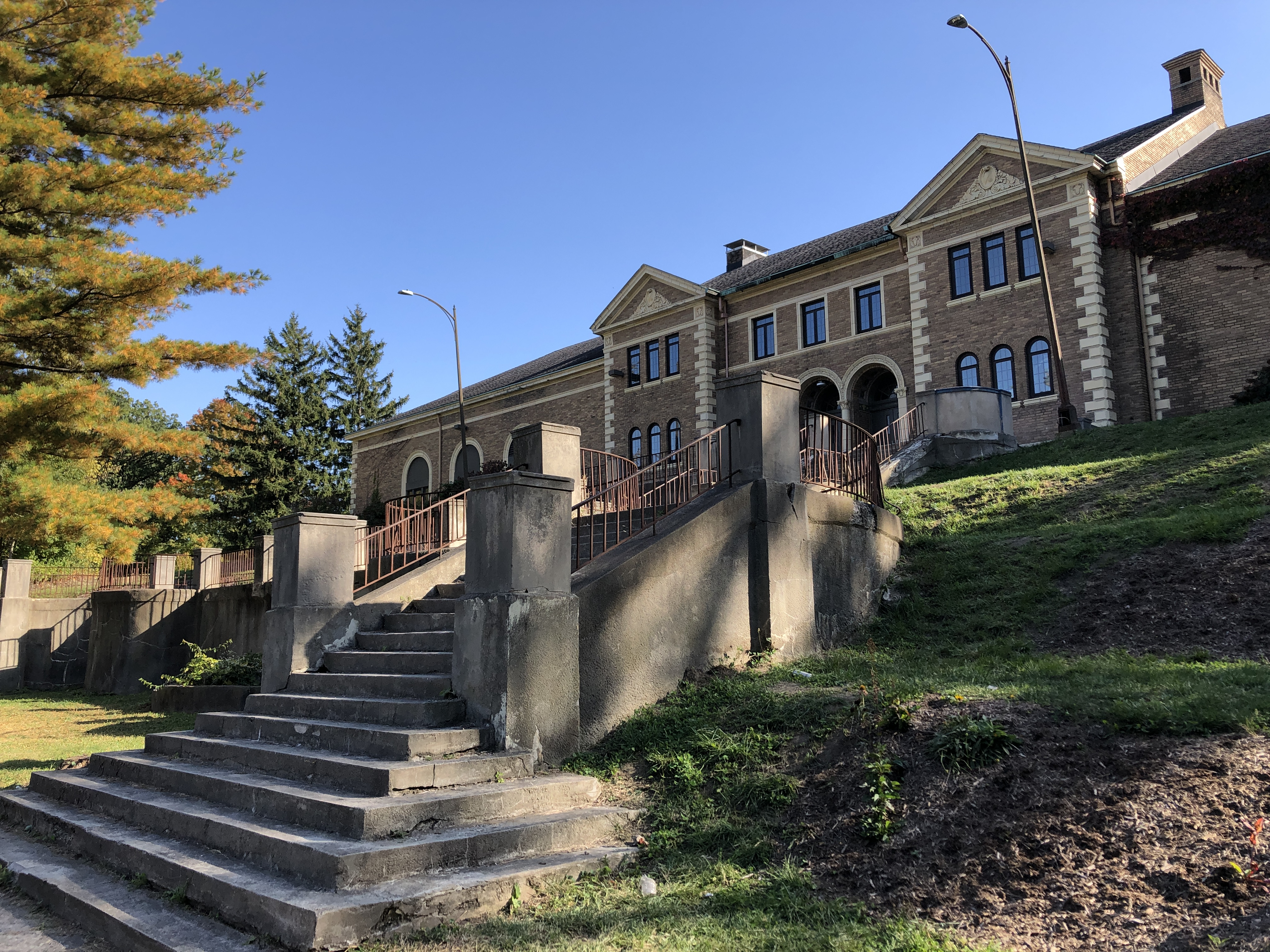
- Brookside Park Family Center in 2022

- Location within Indianapolis
- Interactive map of Brookside Park
- Type: Urban park
- Location: 3091 Brookside Parkway North Dr. Indianapolis, Indiana, U.S.
- Coordinates: 39°47′23″N 86°06′25″W
- Area: 108 acres (44 ha)
- Created: 1898
- Operator: Indy Parks and Recreation
- Open: All year
- Website: Official website

Brookside Park is a 108-acre (0.44 km^{2}) urban park in Indianapolis, Indiana, United States. It is located at 3501 Brookside Parkway North Drive on the near eastside of Indianapolis, just north of the Rural-Sherman neighborhood. The park straddles Pogue's Run, a tributary of the White River. It was added to the National Register of Historic Places in 2003 under the Indianapolis Park and Boulevard System, a federally-recognized historic district.

Brookside Park features a public swimming pool, a 20,000-square-foot (1,900 m^{2}) community center, outdoor shelters (able to be reserved through Indy Parks), baseball fields, soccer fields, a disc golf course, basketball courts, and several nature trails. The park is in an urban setting near mixed neighborhoods, with older homes dating from the 1890s and early 20th century bungalows. Historic home restoration has begun, and new affordable housing has been completed in the first decade of the 21st century.

== See also ==
- List of parks in Indianapolis
