= Garfield Park (Indianapolis) =

Municipal park in Indianapolis, Indiana, US

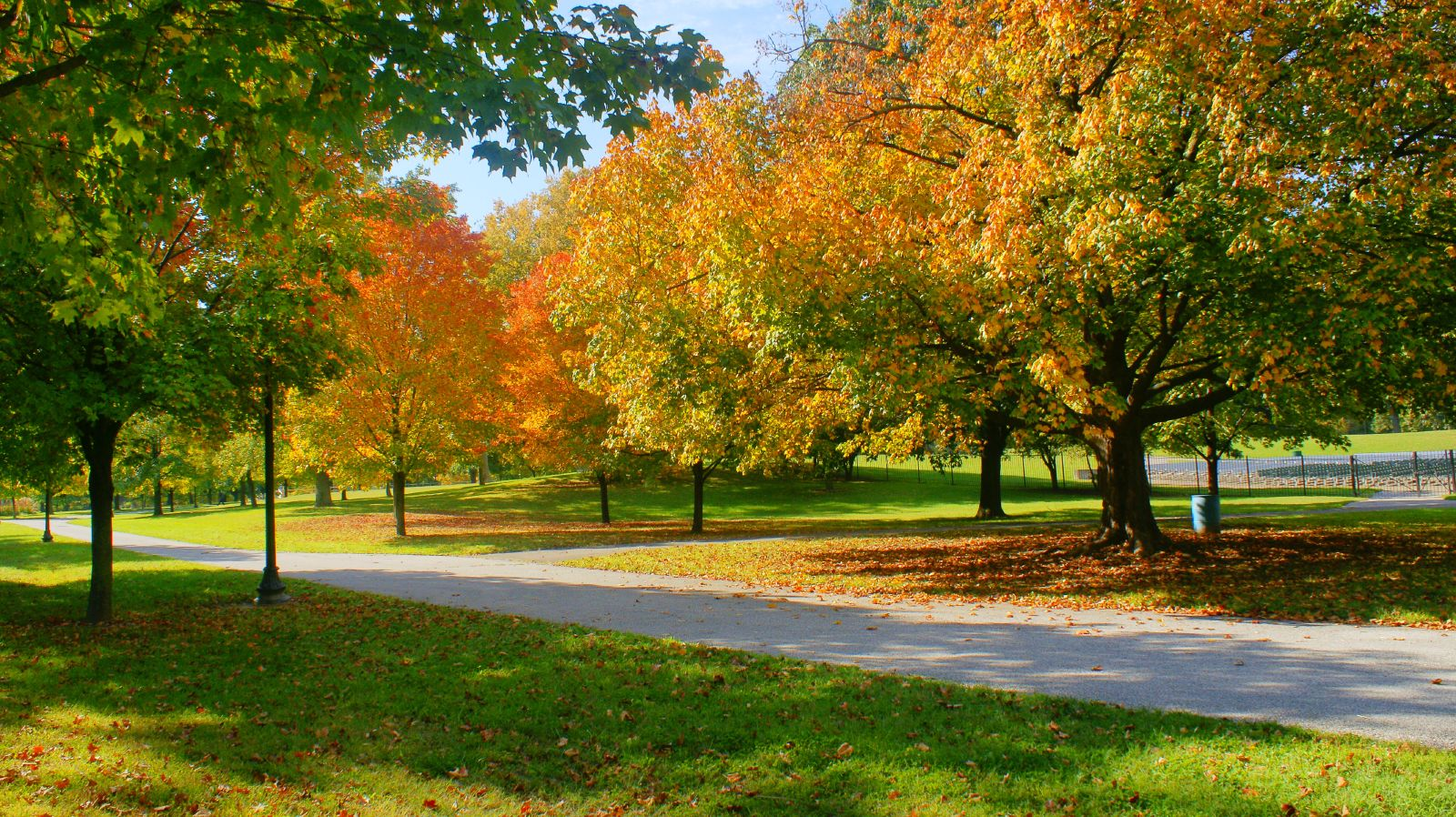
- Garfield Park landscape in 2008

- Location within Indianapolis
- Type: Urban park
- Location: 2345 Pagoda Dr. Conservatory: 2505 Conservatory Dr. Arts Center: 2432 Conservatory Dr. Indianapolis, Indiana, USA
- Coordinates: 39°43′55.49″N 86°08′31.27″W
- Area: 128 acres (52 ha)
- Created: 1881
- Operator: Indy Parks and Recreation
- Open: All year
- Website: Garfield Park
- Garfield Park
- U.S. Historic district – Contributing property
- Part of: Indianapolis Park and Boulevard System (ID03000149)
- Added to NRHP: March 28, 2003

Garfield Park is a 128-acre (52 ha) urban park in Indianapolis, Indiana, United States. Established in the late 19th century, it is the oldest city park in Indianapolis and is on the National Register of Historic Places. The park is located at the confluence of Pleasant Run and Bean Creeks on the near Southside of Indianapolis. The 10,000-square-foot (930 m^{2}) Conservatory and Sunken Gardens are located in the eastern portion of the park. The noted landscape architect George Edward Kessler designed the Sunken Gardens along with many of the other features of the park as part of his Park and Boulevard Plan for the city.

== Geography ==
Garfield Park is bounded by Raymond Street on the north; South Garfield Drive, East Garfield Drive, and Shelby Street on the east; Southern Avenue on the south; and the Louisville and Indiana Railroad tracks on the west. Emmerich Manual High School lies directly to the west on the other side of the railroad track embankment.

Much of the park is rolling fields, due at least in part to its location at the confluence of Pleasant Run and Bean Creeks. Pleasant Run enters the park from the north and flows southwest before exiting on the west. Bean Creek enters from the south near Shelby Street and flows northwest until joining Pleasant Run. Seven bridges span the streams within the park; three of them are for pedestrians only. The oldest of these bridges are constructed of limestone.

Garfield Park is an integral component of the Indianapolis Park and Boulevard System designed by George Kessler. Pleasant Run Parkway North Drive passes through the park as it follows the stream from the east side of Indianapolis toward the White River. The Pleasant Run Trail runs north from Garfield Park to Christian Park and Ellenberger Park, also following the creek; it enters the park on a boardwalk that passes beneath the Raymond Street bridge over the creek. The trail connects with a number of paths within the park. A large hill between the trail and South Garfield Drive is used for sledding during the winter.

A dam located where the two creeks meet at one time created a pond that was used for ice skating during the winter. That dam has since been removed, but remnants of it can still be seen near the Pagoda Drive bridge. A 1992 tornado destroyed twenty percent of Garfield Park's trees, but a number of large trees, including oaks, maples, sycamores, ginkgoes, and catalpas, still shade the park.

== History ==
=== 1800s ===
In 1871, the Jeffersonville Railroad sold 98 acres (40 ha) of right-of-way known as Bradley Woods to a horse track organization. The group intended to create a racetrack whose harness racing events and annual fair would compete with the Indiana State Fair. However, the Southern Riding Park proved to be an unsuccessful venture, in part because it was not easily accessible to the residents of the city. The Panic of 1873 caused the acreage to be sold to N. R. Rucker, the Marion County sheriff, who himself sold the area to the city of Indianapolis shortly thereafter in 1874 for $109,500. The city in turn leased the property to the Indiana Trotting Association; that group also failed, so control reverted to the city.

The city opened what was originally named Southern Park in 1876, the first park owned by the city itself. While University Park and Military Park are older, both are owned by the state of Indiana rather than the city. The park was renamed for President James Garfield soon after his assassination in 1881. The park's usage remained low during its first two decades due to its distance from the city proper and the lack of facilities. The City Council heard and rejected proposals to use the land for a dairy farm (1877), a city cemetery (1882), a factory (1885); and to relocate the Indiana State Fair in exchange for the then-current fair site in Morton Place (1878).

In 1888, the City Council appropriated $10,000 for improvements in the park, including a bridge over Pleasant Run. By 1895 a streetcar line had been extended to the park, allowing easier access. The Board of Park Commissioners was created in 1895 and another $10,000 was appropriated for repairs and to plan and remodel the facilities. The improvements made in prior years had been done haphazardly.

Major improvements were made almost annually for the next twenty years: a bicycle path in 1901; the Pagoda in 1903; an increase in greenhouse capacity from 40,000 square feet (3,700 m^{2}) to 200,000 square feet (19,000 m^{2}) in 1904; exhibition cages for bears, monkeys, and small animals in 1905; tennis courts and brick and limestone entrance and corner posts, also in 1905; and two swimming beaches on Bean Creek, one for boys and one for girls, in 1910.

Additional land was acquired for the park starting in 1893. Between 1893 and 1895, a strip of land running from the then-eastern boundary of the park to Shelby Street along what is now East Garfield Drive was added. In 1899, several acres in the northwest corner of the park were acquired. The final addition came in 1912 through 1915 when 25 acres (10 ha) of the Yoke farmstead were purchased as the result of a bequest from Alfred Burdsal; this area extended south from the 1893/1895 addition to Southern Avenue and includes the site of the Conservatory and Sunken Gardens. The result of these acquisitions was to increase the size of Garfield Park to 128 acres (52 ha).

=== 1900s ===
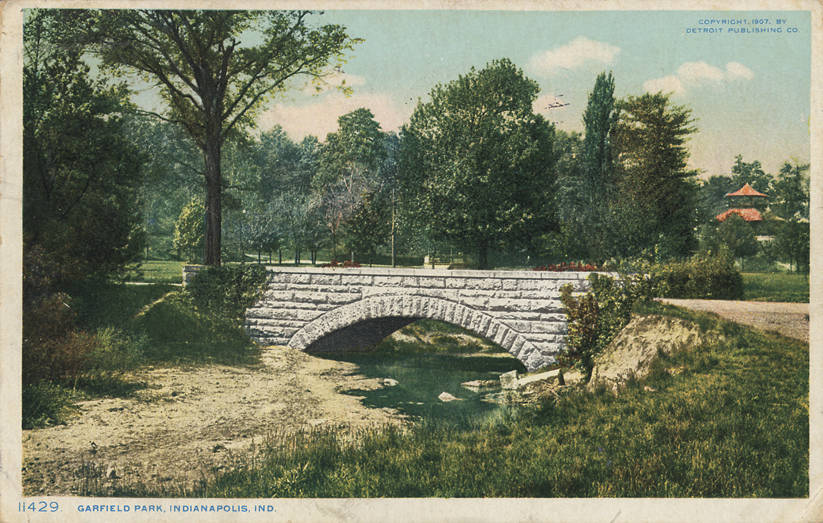
Stone bridge and pagoda, 1907 postcard

In 1908, the city hired the noted landscape architect George Kessler to develop a Park and Boulevard Plan, which was adopted in 1909. Kessler spent the next several years detailing those plans. In 1912, he created a complete master plan for Garfield Park, one of only a few parks for which he completed a full plan. One of his aims in this plan was to make use of the existing improvements in the park. The formal Sunken Gardens and new bridges, were the major new elements in his plan.

On July 14, 1919, a race riot started in the park and ended at a nearby house. Multiple people, including a seven-year-old girl, were wounded when gunfire broke out at the house. Major improvements to the park ceased due to financial constraints faced by the city during the Great Depression and World War II. Maintenance of the park continued to be a problem in the post-war years, although some new construction occurred, including the erection of a new conservatory building in 1954. Vandalism and other crime increased, and in response, the city closed the park at night. Part of the loop or park roadways were closed off and eventually removed to reduce through traffic in the belief that doing so would also reduce the opportunity for criminal activity.

The general deterioration of park structures led, in the case of the Pagoda, to it being scheduled for demolition in the 1970s. Community opposition to the demolition and funds collected as a result allowed the Pagoda to be restored. Other restoration efforts followed. The Sunken Gardens were renovated around 1970 and in 1977 to 1978, and again in 1998. A new Family Center and outdoor Aquatic Center were opened in 1996, replacing the old pool. In 2006, the Community House was remodeled to become the Arts Center.

A Garfield Park Master Plan was created by the Department of Metropolitan Development and updated in 1989 to guide future restoration and development of the park. In 1995, a new plan was prepared by Ratio Architects, and major funding was obtained to begin major restorations in 1996. The Friends of Garfield Park was formed in 1998 to aid in the protection and maintenance of the park and established the Garfield Park Fund to help finance those efforts.

== Conservatory, Sunken Gardens, and Blake's Garden ==
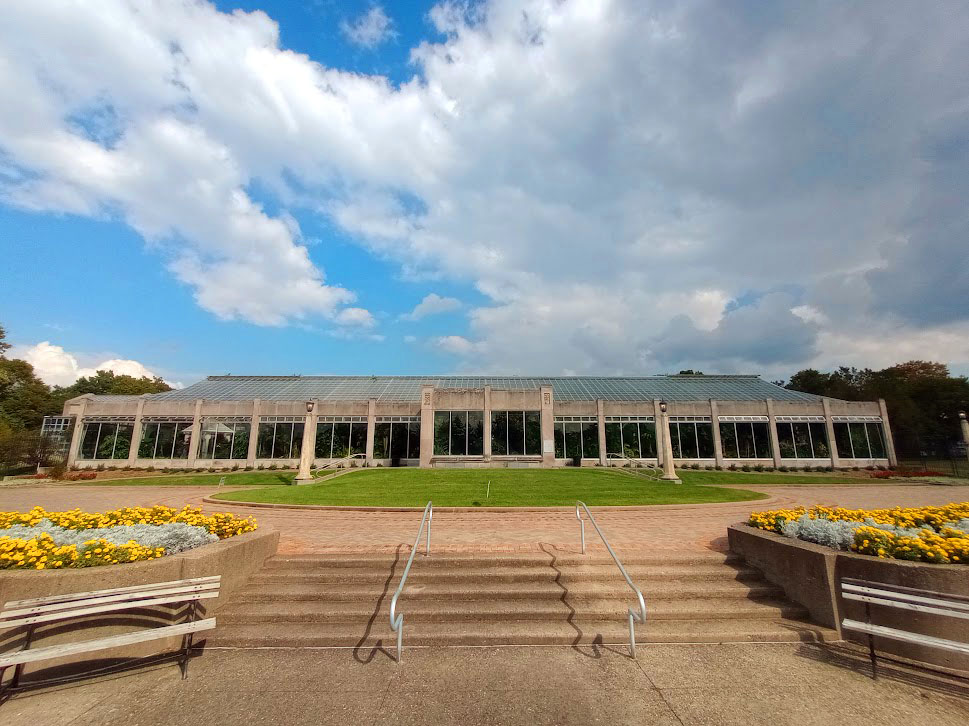
Garfield Park Conservatory

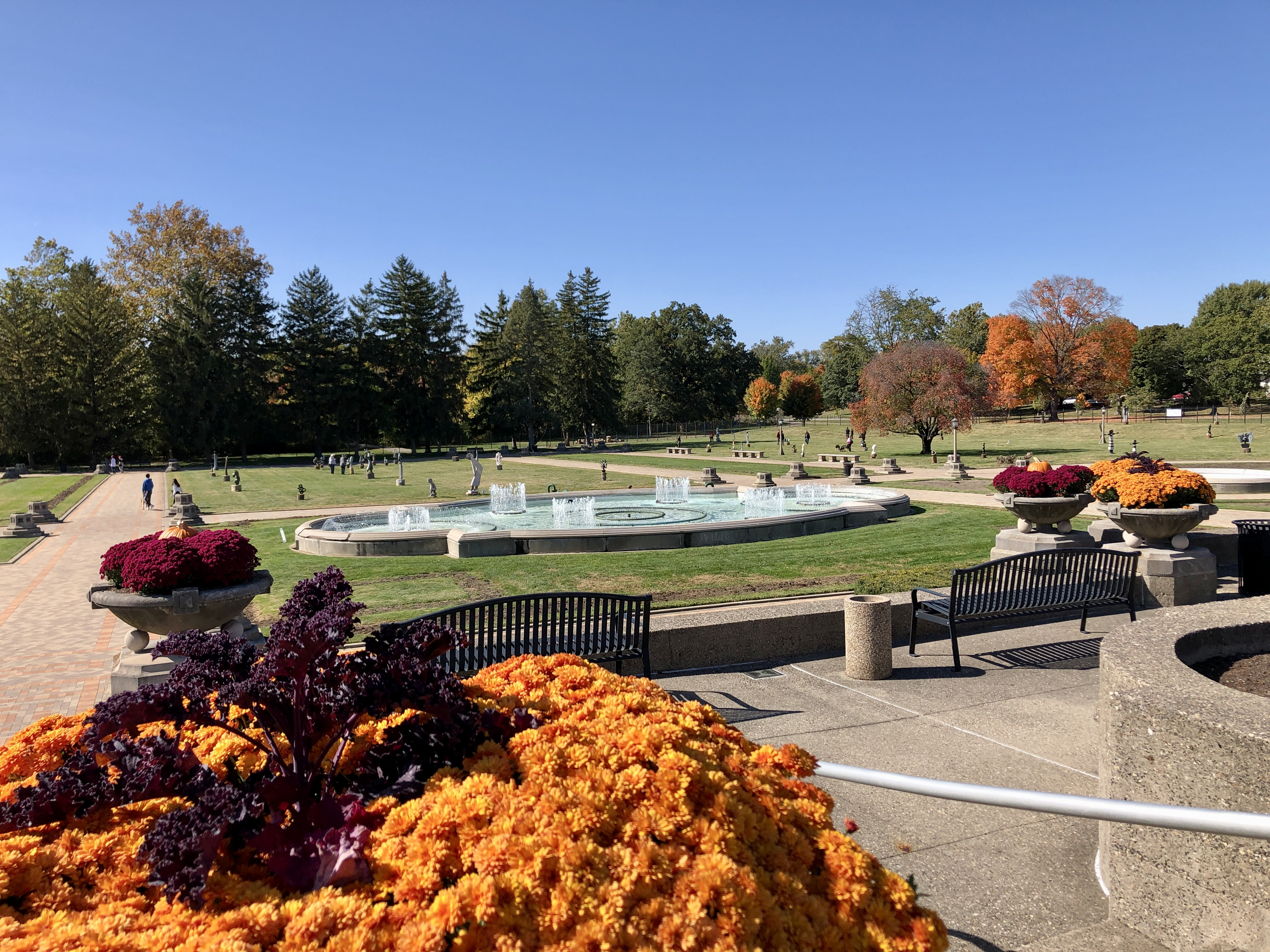
Garfield Park Sunken Gardens

The first conservatory building in Garfield Park was built in 1915. By mid-century, its condition had deteriorated and so it was replaced in 1954 with a new structure designed by the Indianapolis architectural firm of Burns and Burns. The 10,000 square foot (930 m^{2}) Conservatory is constructed of welded-aluminum and glass, and was the first of its kind in the United States. It was renovated in 1997.

Also in 1954, the Pioneer Family fountain was moved to the Conservatory because of traffic congestion at its original site at the intersection of Virginia Avenue and Prospect and Shelby streets in Fountain Square. It remained at the Conservatory until 1969, when it was returned to Fountain Square. From 2009 to 2012 it was again temporarily moved to the Conservatory while a new site in Fountain Square was prepared.

The Conservatory features tropical plants, including an Amazon River rainforest, a large collection of bromeliads, orchids, and other epiphytes planted in a natural setting, along with miscellaneous flowering plants. A chief attraction is the indoor 15-foot-tall (4.6 m) granite waterfall. Visitors can guide themselves around the conservatory.

The Sunken Gardens (3 acres (1.2 ha)) were designed by George Kessler and dedicated in 1916. They are European-style formal gardens, with three fountains, paved brick walkways, and benches. They are replanted three times a year with seasonal displays, taking advantage of the tulips of spring, the annuals of summer, and the chrysanthemums of autumn. The fountains and floral displays have been held in high regard throughout the American Midwest since its 1916 dedication. Fish ponds were included in the original design but have since been removed.

The fountains, the work of F. W. Darlington, are an example of musical fountains with colored lights and synchronized music. Several renovations have been undertaken since the fountains were inaugurated in 1916, including one in 1998 that was funded by Lilly Endowment. In October 2013, a $1.23 million makeover saw the installation of 61 LED illumination lights and 2,500 water jet nozzles, all under computer control.

Both the Conservatory and the Gardens are open seven days a week, during business hours. During the Christmas season the Conservatory has its Annual Holiday Poinsettia Show. In the summer, the Sunken gardens features concerts, collectively known as Music in the Garden. The grounds are available for weddings, but not for other private events.

The garden space just east of the Conservatory was known as the Children's Garden until a renovation and renaming to Blake's Garden in 2019. Blake's Garden is named for Blake Bowell, who had grown up, worked at, and spent time in Garfield Park until his death in 2017 at the age of 25 due to brain cancer. The garden is home to Fran's Place, an educational space dedicated to the wife of P. E. MacAllister for whom the MacAllister Center for the Performing Arts is named. Just inside the gates is the Divine Light sculpture created by Indiana native and Bowell family friend, Kenzie Funk. Blake's Garden was awarded the 2019 People's Choice Award and the 2019 Achievement Award for Landscape Architecture by the Indy Chamber Monumental Affairs Awards. In addition it was awarded the 2019 Indiana Parks and Recreation Award for Excellence in Landscape Design.

== Facilities ==
Besides the Conservatory and Sunken Gardens, Garfield Park contains a number of public facilities.

=== Pagoda ===
The Pagoda is so named because of the strong Asian influence in the design of its roof. The curved copper roof covers the otherwise-open wrought iron, rock, and concrete structure. Built in 1903, this picnic shelter was intended to take advantage of the then-popular fad of opera. Originally it also housed the superintendent's office, a storage room, and, in a lower level, public restrooms. The office and restrooms were later removed. The most recent renovation was in 1995, at which time the structure was made ADA-compliant. A playground and parking lot are located to the south of the Pagoda.

=== Garfield Park Arts Center ===
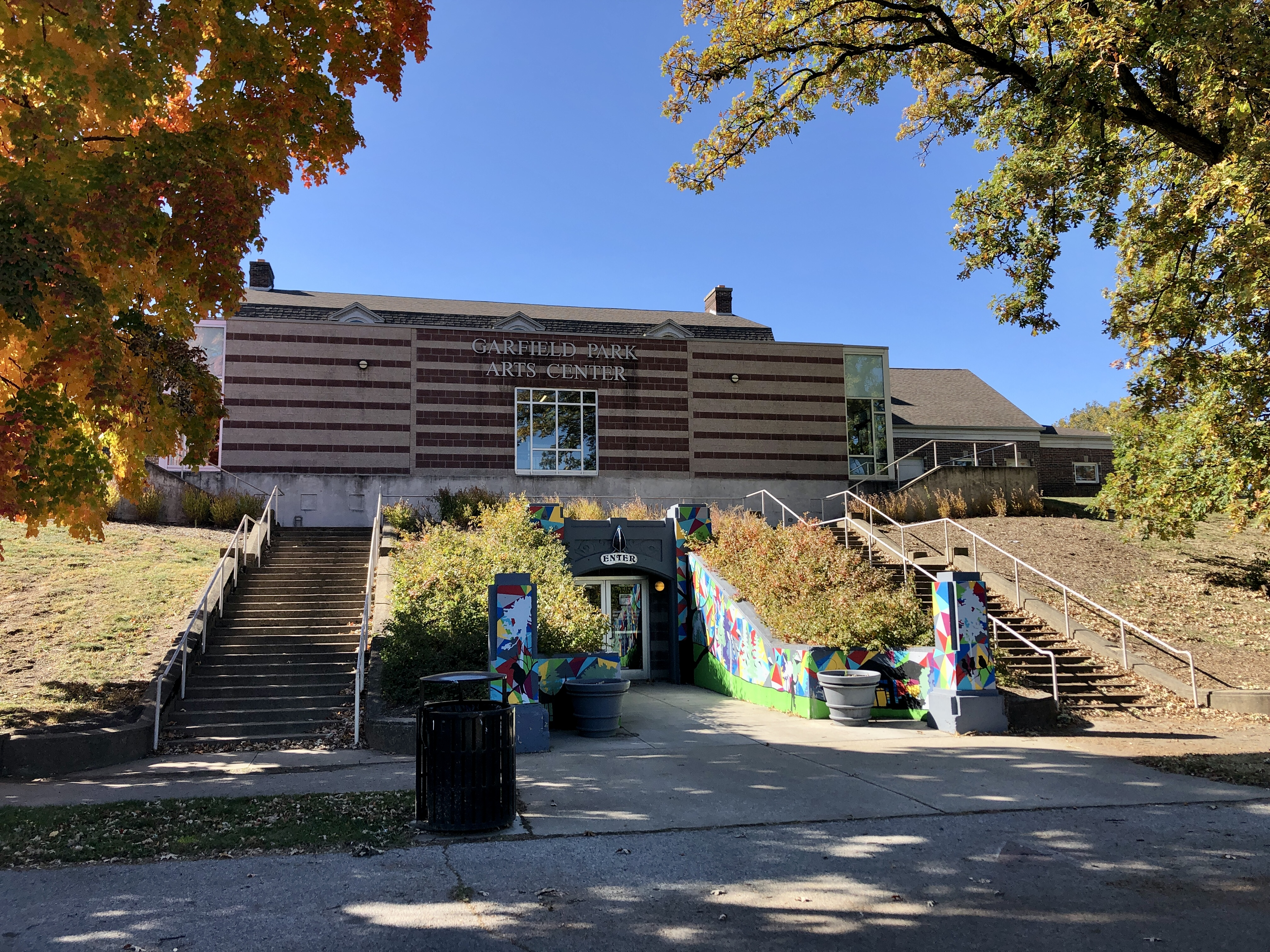
Garfield Park Arts Center in 2022

The Community House (or as it was also known, the Shelter House) was built in 1922. Located in the center of the park on the hillside to the west of Bean Creek, it was designed to look like a picnic shelter with enclosing walls, high ceilings, and fireplaces at each end. It served as the site of the Children's Museum of Indianapolis for one year in 1926. The basement, which has a ground-level entrance at the bottom of the hill, originally was used as a children's playroom. In 1930, an outdoor swimming pool was constructed at the bottom of the hill between the Community House and the creek, and the basement was converted into locker rooms. The main floor also served as a small basketball court. In the late 1990s, the old pool was removed because it had deteriorated and had been replaced by the Aquatic Center. In 2006 the Community House was remodeled and enlarged using a $2.7 million grant from Lilly Endowment to become the Garfield Park Arts Center. The 8,000 square foot (740 m^{2}) facility now houses a multi-use performing arts space, an exhibition hall, visual and production arts classrooms, a recording studio, a literary arts library, and a rehearsal room.

=== MacAllister Center for the Performing Arts ===
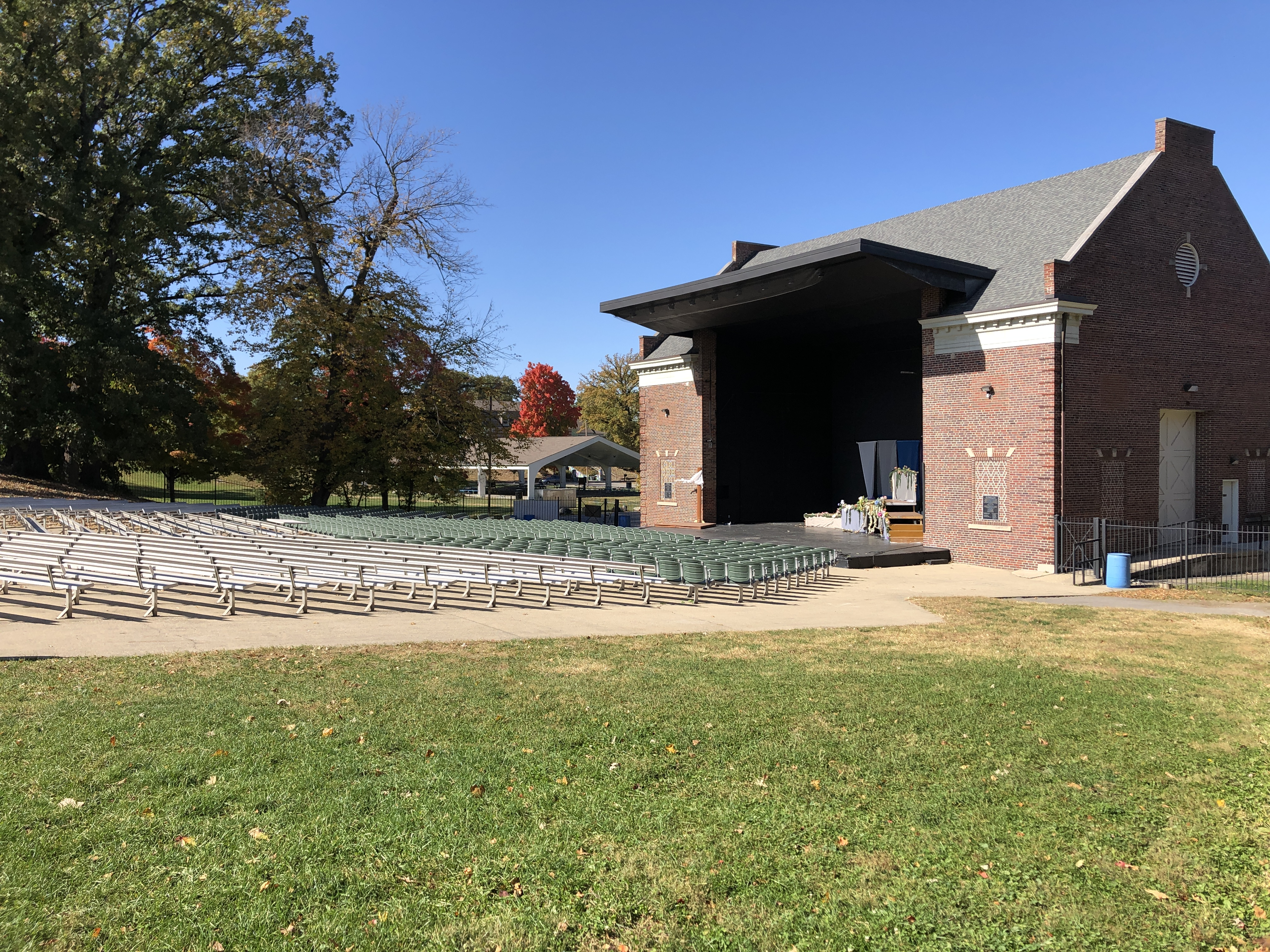
MacAllister Center for the Performing Arts in 2022

The MacAllister Center for the Performing Arts, originally known as the Amphitheatre, was constructed in the mid-1920s. It lies southeast of the Arts Center and consists of a covered stage with outdoor bench and lawn seating. It has hosted a number of musical and theatrical shows, including the first production of Starlight Musicals in 1944. Local Shakespeare groups have often performed at the center. The Indianapolis Symphony Orchestra has regularly scheduled one of its Symphony in the Parks events each summer, and the annual America We Remember music and fireworks show is well-attended.

=== Burrello Family Center and Aquatic Center ===
In 1998, the Burrello Family Center and Aquatic Center opened, replacing the old pool and basketball court at the Community House. This facility is located at 2345 Pagoda Drive, just south of the point where Bean Creek joins Pleasant Run. The outdoor Aquatic Center is open during the summer months. The Family Center contains fitness and other recreational facilities in addition to the gymnasium.

=== Other facilities ===
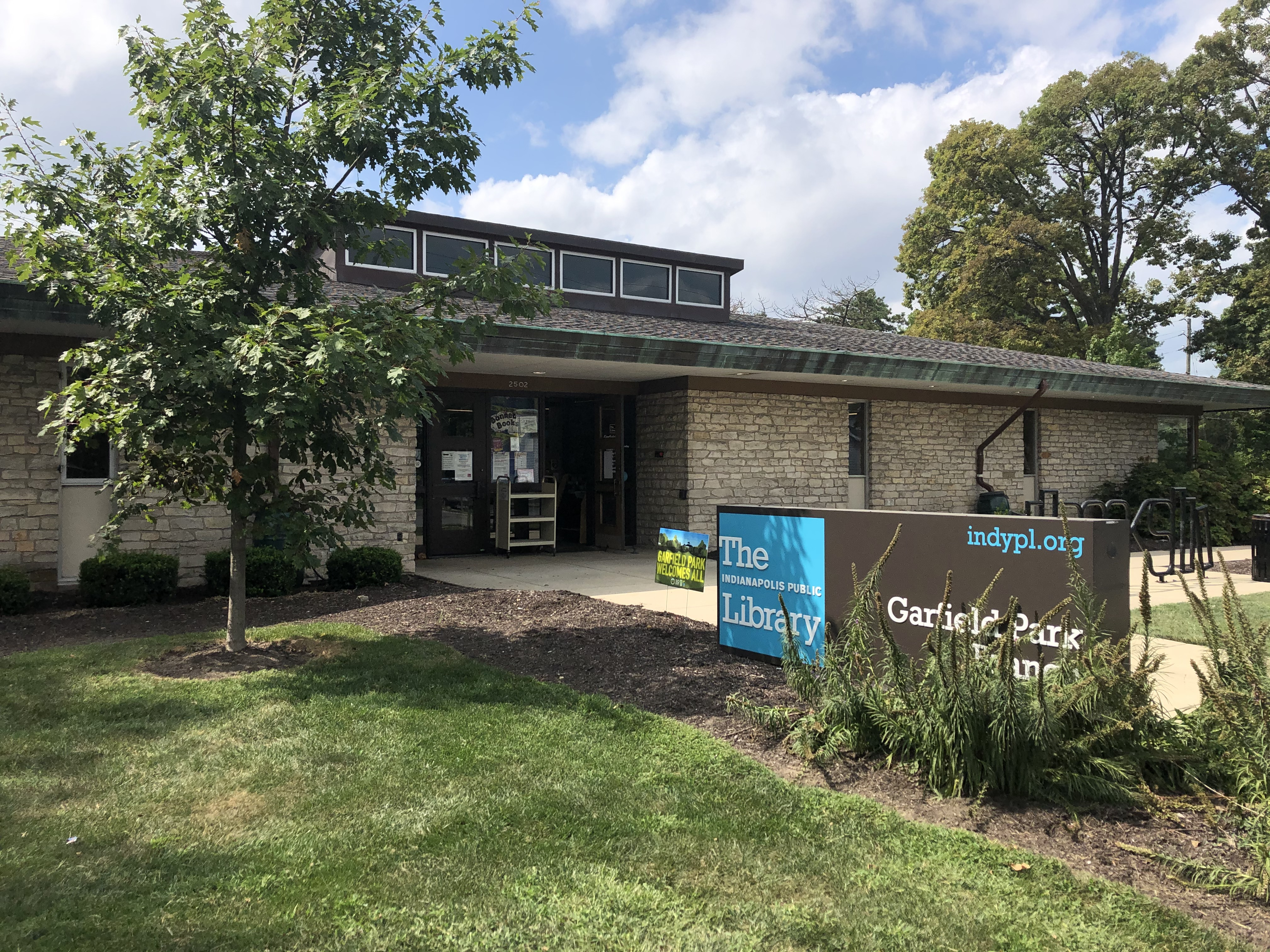
Garfield Park Branch of the Indianapolis Public Library

Other facilities include tennis courts in the southeast corner near the intersection of Shelby Street and Southern Avenue, ball fields in the west along Pagoda Drive, and horseshoe pits across Bean Creek from the Burrello Family Center.

Facilities of two other governmental units have also been constructed within the park boundaries in more recent years. The Garfield Park Branch (formerly known as the Shelby Branch) of the Indianapolis Public Library is located on the eastern edge of the park at 2502 Shelby Street, directly east of the Conservatory and Sunken Gardens. The 6,400 square foot (590 m^{2}) building opened on November 8, 1965. An extensive renovation was undertaken in 2011, with the library reopening on November 3, 2011, at which time its name was changed to the Garfield Park Branch. Station 29 of the Indianapolis Fire Department is located at 602 E. Pleasant Run Parkway, North Drive near the Grove of Remembrance in the northern section of the park; the station was opened on April 17, 1991.

== Memorials ==
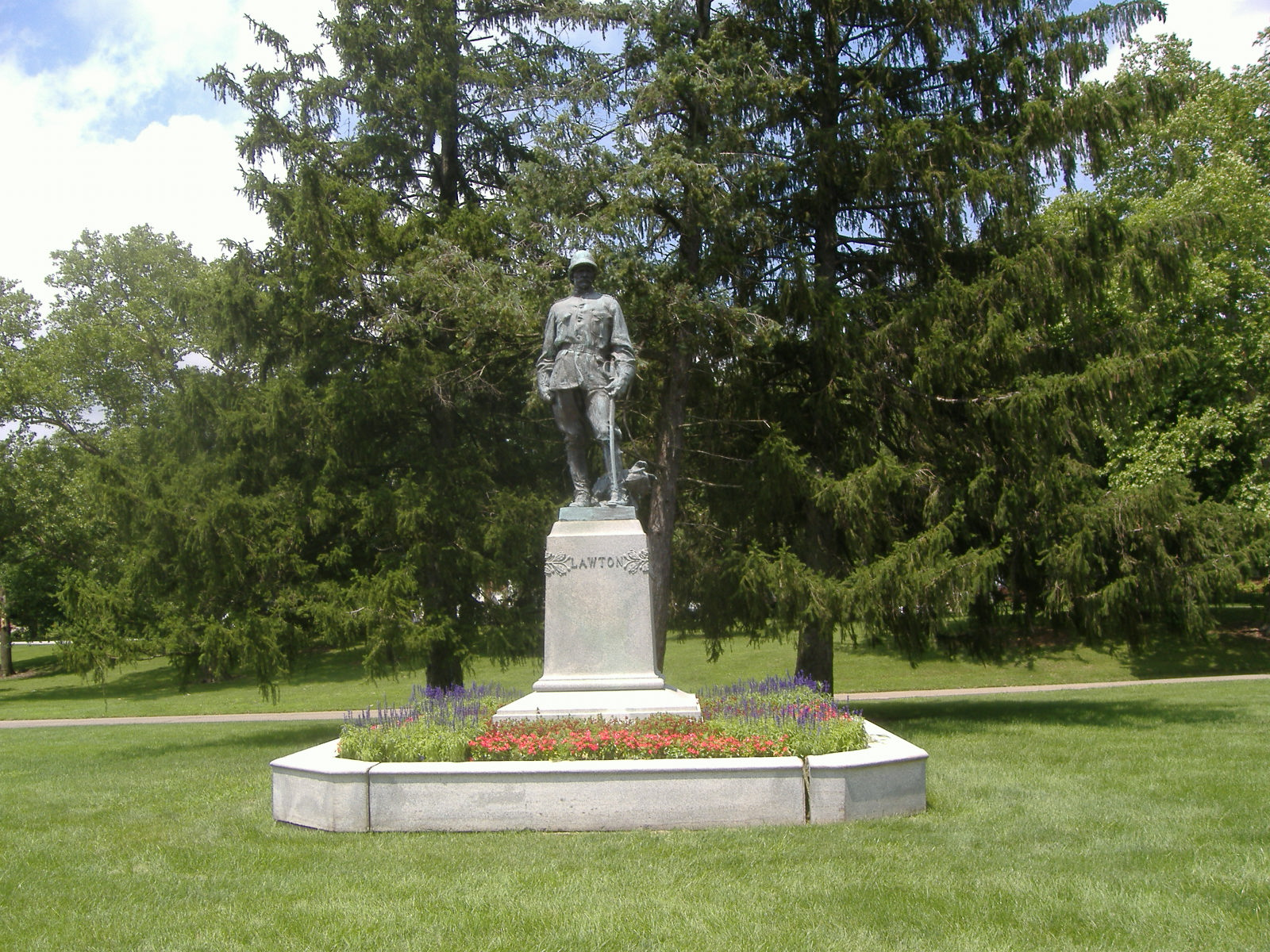
Statue of Henry Ware Lawton near the Garfield Park Conservatory

Two memorials are within the grounds of Garfield Park.

- The Grove of Remembrance was created in 1920. Located in the northwestern section of the park, it honors the fallen soldiers from Indianapolis in World War I. Originally a tree was planted for each individual soldier, 387 in total.
- A statue of Major General Henry W. Lawton of Fort Wayne was created by the sculptor Andrew O'Connor. Lawton fought in the American Civil War, later led the capture of the Apache warrior Geronimo, and died in the Philippines during the Spanish–American War. The statue is located just north of the Conservatory, and was placed in Garfield Park in 1915, being moved from its original location on the grounds of the old Marion County Courthouse.

The Confederate Soldiers and Sailors Monument, a granite shaft dedicated to the 1,616 Confederate soldiers who died at the Camp Morton prison camp, stood on the southern edge of the park for over 80 years. The monument originally was erected in 1912 in the old Greenlawn Cemetery where the soldiers had been buried. When that cemetery was later closed, the remains of the soldiers were moved between 1928 and 1933 to Crown Hill Cemetery. At the request of the Southern Club of Indianapolis, the monument was moved to the site in Garfield Park near the Southern Avenue entrance to make it more visible to the public; there were plans to eventually move the monument to Crown Hill, but for financial or other reasons it remained in the park. On June 4, 2020, Mayor Joe Hogsett announced plans to dismantle and remove the monument. The decision came in the midst of nationwide protests of police brutality following the murder of George Floyd by Minneapolis Police.

== List of points of interest ==
Points of interest within Garfield Park
Landmark	Location
Conservatory	39.732120°N 86.141303°W
Sunken Gardens	39.732093°N 86.142074°W
Pagoda	39.732127°N 86.147172°W
Garfield Park Arts Center	39.732666°N 86.146551°W
MacAllister Center for the Performing Arts	39.731854°N 86.144935°W
Burrello Family Center and Aquatic Center	39.734102°N 86.148251°W
Tennis Courts	39.730835°N 86.140290°W
Horseshoe Pits	39.735345°N 86.148347°W
Garfield Park Branch Library	39.731948°N 86.140007°W
Fire Station 29	39.736819°N 86.148167°W
Former site of Camp Morton POW Memorial	39.730741°N 86.143934°W
Grove of Remembrance	39.736218°N 86.149230°W
Henry W. Lawton Statue	39.732885°N 86.141577°W
Pleasant Run Trail Trailhead	39.735970°N 86.146622°W

== See also ==
- List of parks in Indianapolis
- List of botanical gardens and arboretums in Indiana
