= Camp Morton =

Civil War training area in Indianapolis, IN, US

Coordinates: 39°47′40.76″N 86°9′8.14″W

- Part of American Civil War prison camps
- Indianapolis (Marion County), Indiana, United States
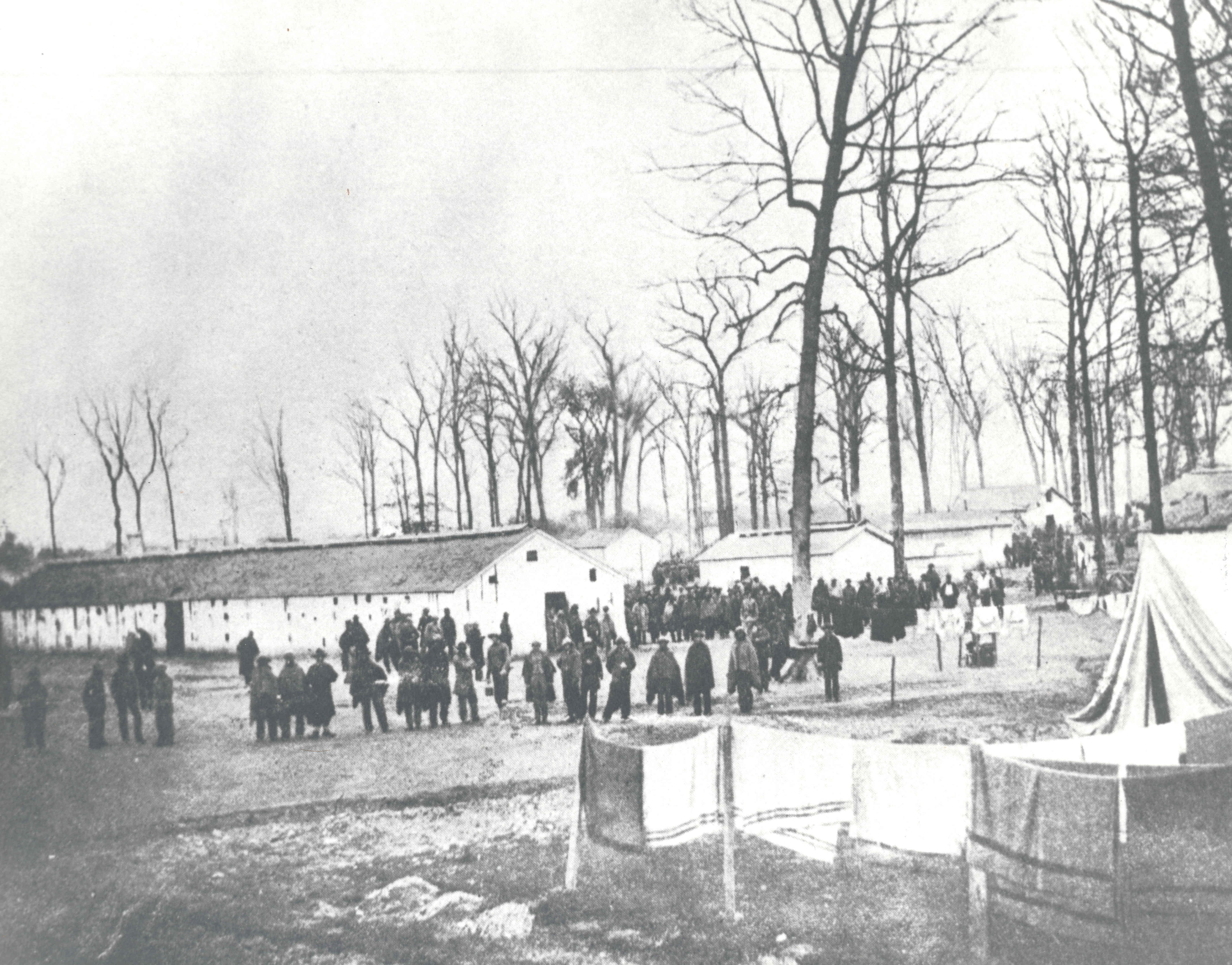

Site information
- Type: Training Camp and Union Prison Camp
- Owner: Marion County, Indiana government, U.S. Government
- Controlled by: Union Army

Site history
- Built: 1861
- In use: February 22, 1862 – June 12, 1865
- Demolished: 1891
- Battles/wars: American Civil War

Garrison information
- Occupants: Union soldiers, Confederate prisoners of war

Camp Morton was a military training ground and a Union prisoner-of-war camp in Indianapolis, Indiana, during the American Civil War. It was named for Indiana governor Oliver Morton. Prior to the war, the site served as the fairgrounds for the Indiana State Fair. During the war, Camp Morton was initially used as a military training ground. The first Union troops arrived at the camp in April 1861. After the fall of Fort Donelson and the Battle of Shiloh, the site was converted into a prisoner-of-war camp. The first Confederate prisoners arrived at Camp Morton on February 22, 1862; its last prisoners were paroled on June 12, 1865. At the conclusion of the war, the property resumed its role as the fairgrounds for the Indiana State Fair. In 1891 the property was sold and developed into a residential neighborhood known as Morton Place, a part of the Herron-Morton Place Historic District.

Camp Morton was established on a 36-acre (150,000 m^{2}) tract of land that bordered present-day Central Avenue and Nineteenth, Twenty-second, and Talbott Streets. It was among the largest of the Union's eight prison camps established for Confederate noncommissioned officers and privates. Between 1862 and 1865, the camp's average prison population was 3,214; it averaged fifty deaths per month. Its maximum prison population reached 4,999 in July 1864. More than 1,700 prisoners died at the camp during its four years of operation.

While the military facilities at Camp Morton no longer exist, the remains of 1,616 Confederate soldiers and sailors who died while prisoners at the camp are interred at Indianapolis's Crown Hill Cemetery. Several monuments and historical markers commemorate Camp Morton, including a bust of Richard Owen, a camp commandant, at the Indiana Statehouse, and memorials to the Confederate prisoners who died at the camp at Indianapolis's Garfield Park and Crown Hill.The memorial at Garfield Park was dismantled on June 8, 2020.

== Union training camp ==
Camp Morton served as a military camp for Union soldiers from April 1861 to February 1862. Two days after the first shots were fired at Fort Sumter in Charleston harbor, South Carolina, on April 12, 1861, Indiana's governor Morton offered to raise and equip ten thousand Indiana troops in response to President Abraham Lincoln's call for volunteers to suppress the Southern rebellion and preserve the Union. Morton and his adjutant general, Lew Wallace, chose the site of the Indiana State Fairgrounds for a mustering ground and military camp at Indianapolis. The site had served as the state fairgrounds since 1859, and had previously been known as Henderson's Grove, named after Samuel Henderson, the first mayor of Indianapolis. The 36-acre (150,000 m^{2}) tract of partially wooded farmland north of the city loosely bordered present-day Central Avenue and Nineteenth, Twenty-second, and Talbott Streets.

After the fairgrounds were converted into a military camp, it was renamed Camp Morton in honor of Morton, who served as the governor of Indiana from January 16, 1861, to January 23, 1867. The first recruits arrived at the facility on April 17, 1861, four days after the surrender at Fort Sumter. The camp's barracks were converted cattle and horse stalls, a hospital was established in the power hall, the dining hall became the commissary, and office space was converted into military offices and guardhouses. Existing buildings could not house all the incoming troops, so new sheds were built with bunks; however, the soldiers had to bathe in Fall Creek. The hastily built facility had difficulties accommodating so many men with equipment, tents, and food, but order was established within a few weeks. Many residents of Indianapolis saw the camp as a center of attraction.

== Military prison camp ==
Indianapolis's Camp Morton was among the largest of the Union's eight prison camps established for Confederate noncommissioned officers and privates. Other large prison camps included Camp Douglas (Chicago, Illinois), Camp Chase (Columbus, Ohio), and Camp Butler (Springfield, Illinois). General officers for the Confederacy were sent to an island in Boston Harbor, where Fort Warren was located, and lesser commissioned officers from the Confederacy were sent to Johnson's Island in Ohio's Sandusky Bay.

When Camp Morton was established in 1862, it was initially under state control until the U.S. government assumed responsibility for its prisoners. The camp reopened in 1863 with the intention of housing only infirm prisoners, but others were detained at the facility as well. From July 1863 until the parole of the last Confederate prisoner on June 12, 1865, the camp's average prison population was 3,214 and it averaged fifty deaths per month. The maximum prisoner population at Camp Morton during that time reach 4,999, in July 1864, and the maximum of deaths reached 133.

=== 1862 ===
On February 17, 1862, two days after the fall of Fort Donelson, near present-day Clarksville, Tennessee, Morton informed Union general Henry W. Halleck that Indianapolis could, if necessary, hold three thousand Confederate prisoners. Captain James A. Ekin, assistant quartermaster general of the Union Army, was charged with converting Camp Morton to a prison camp. Stalls were converted into sleeping quarters for the prisoners and additional barracks and latrines were built. A walled palisade was constructed of wood around the perimeter of the camp; it also included reinforced gates and a walkway for sentry patrols. Initially, there was no hospital within the camp; other Indianapolis facilities were used to treat the prisoners.

On February 22, the first Confederate prisoners arrived by train at Indianapolis. Additional prisoners arrived at the camp over the next three days, bringing the number of prisoners to thirty-seven hundred men. Local residents helped provide the necessary food, clothing, and nursing to the incoming prisoners. The death rate among the unfortunate Confederate prisoners was high. In March 1862, 144 prisoners died at the camp. By April 1 the camp's inhabitants, including prisoners and guards, numbered five thousand. More prisoners arrived in subsequent months, including a group of a thousand prisoners from the battle at Shiloh.

Confederate officers who had commissions were separated from their men and quartered in a barracks on Washington Street and elsewhere in the city until they could be moved to the prison camps in Ohio and Massachusetts. Noncommissioned officers and privates were taken to Camp Morton. Poorly clothed, ill fed, unused to the northern climates, and weakened from recent battles, many of the prisoners fell ill and were taken to makeshift facilities outside the camp for treatment.

Colonel Richard Owen took over as commandant of the prisoner-of-war camp and served in that role until June 20, 1862, when his regiment was called to active duty and he departed Indianapolis with his men. Camp Morton's first prison guards came from the Fourteenth Light Artillery, Fifty-third Regiment of Indiana Volunteers, and the Sixtieth Regiment of Indiana Volunteers. Quarters for the camp's prison guards were established at Camp Burnside, a Union camp located between Nineteenth and Tinker (present-day Sixteenth) Streets, south of Camp Morton. The guards were understaffed and overworked. On May 4, 1862, Owen reported less than one regiment plus 202 men from another were guarding more than four thousand prisoners at Camp Morton. In comparison, two regiments guarded about a thousand prisoners at Camp Chase in Columbus, Ohio.

Few guidelines were provided for operating Union prison camps, so Owen devised his own, which served as a model for other camps. Owen's policies were sympathetic to the prisoners' needs. Under his command, camp discipline was strict, but humane, and allowed for self-government among the prisoners, which local leaders criticized on occasion. Early challenges at the camp included equitable distribution of rations and supplies. A camp bakehouse was erected and in operation by mid-April 1862. It provided prisoners a place to work and the means to earn money to purchase small amenities. A fund established from the cash value of the camp's excess rations provided prisoners with additional supplies. While trade with unauthorized vendors did occur, most of the items sold to prisoners came from the camp's sutler.

Recreational activities included music and sports. Prisoners formed musical clubs and theatrical groups and attended band concerts at the camp. Books and periodicals were available in the camp, and a photographer was allowed to make daguerrotypes of the prisoners' likenesses to send to their friends and families in the South. Other pastimes included ballgames and whittling. No visitors or communication between the prisoners and the camp guards or local citizens were allowed, but mail correspondence and small packages were delivered to prisoners after they had been inspected. Contraband was removed before delivery, and outgoing letters were censored and inspected before they were mailed. Attempts to escape were rare while Owen was commandant. Only thirteen of its forty-two hundred prisoners escaped during his command of the camp.

Although later expanded, the hospital on Camp Morton's grounds was not large enough to serve all the camp's prisoners. Indianapolis's City Hospital served Union troops; only a few Confederate prisoners were taken there until its facilities were expanded in May 1862. In the meantime, additional facilities for Confederate prisoners were established in two buildings on Meridian Street, known as Military Hospital Number 2 and Military Hospital Number 3, set up in an old post office on Meridian Street, near Washington Street. A few prisoners were cared for in private homes. No epidemics swept the camp or area hospitals, but there were reports of dysentery, typhoid fever, and typhoid pneumonia, among other diseases.

David Garland Rose succeeded Owen as Camp Morton's commandant on June 19, 1862, and tightened the camp's rules. New volunteers from Indiana's military companies served as replacements for the camp's prison guards. On August 22, 1862, prisoner exchanges were arranged and final orders were given for the removal of the Confederate prisoners at Camp Morton. The prisoners were sent to Vicksburg, Mississippi, where they were exchanged for Union prisoners held in Confederate prison camps. Camp Morton's remaining Confederate prisoners whose names did not appear on the prisoner exchange rolls left the camp by September 1862. Following their departure, Camp Morton was used as a military training ground for Union troops and Indiana volunteers who were sent home on parole. The paroled Union soldiers were not permitted to perform duties that would free other troops for active service. Instead, they guarded and maintained the camp until they were allowed to continue active military service.

=== 1863–65 ===
By 1863 Camp Morton's buildings were in need of repair, but little was spent on improvements. Colonel James Biddle, Seventy-first Indiana Volunteers, became commandant of the camp. Most of his regiment had been captured at Muldraugh Hill, Kentucky, where they were paroled on the field, and had been living at Camp Morton awaiting a prisoner exchange. Soldiers from Biddle's regiment were assigned to guard duty at the camp, with the assistance of other military companies. New prisoners from arrived at Camp Morton between January 29 and the end of March 1863. In April 1863, the camp's prisoners were ordered to City Point, Virginia, and in June a new group arrived, this one from Gallatin, Tennessee.

In July Confederate general John Hunt Morgan, who led Morgan's Raid into southern Indiana and Ohio, caused alarm among the city residents as local military prepared for his arrival, but Morgan turned east, towards Ohio, and never reached Indianapolis. On July 23, 1863, eleven hundred of Morgan's men who had been captured during the raid were brought to Camp Morton. A hundred more arrived a week later. Additional Confederate prisoners came in August 1863, raising the total at the camp to nearly three thousand. In mid-August more than eleven hundred prisoners, including most of Morgan's men, were transferred to Chicago's Camp Douglas.

Escape attempts were more frequent after Owen's tenure at commandant. Some escape plans were especially elaborate, including tunnels and prisoner uprisings. A few of these attempts were made with wooden board planks or crude ladders. Approximately thirty-five men escaped between April and the end of October 1863, but others were unsuccessful. An extra ration was promised to those who informed their Union captors about escape plans.

In July 1863 Captain Albert J. Guthridge was placed in charge of the camp when Biddle and his regiment were reassigned to other duties. David W. Hamilton took over as commandant on July 23, but he was transferred to another post by September 23. Guthridge resumed the duties of commandant until Colonel Ambrose A. Stevens arrived on October 22, 1863. Stevens remained as commandant until the end of the war.

When Stevens took command, the camp's condition had badly deteriorated. Augustus M. Clark, a medical inspector who filed a report on October 22, indicated the camp had 2,362 prisoners with a mortality rate exceeding 12.45 percent. Clark reported that the prisoners had sufficient food, clothing, and water, but noted the camp's structures were dilapidated and poorly maintained. He also suggested the camp suffered from bad drainage, lax discipline, and poor policing of its grounds. Stevens helped improve the camp by providing blankets, better food, and medical care, but the winter of 1863–1864 was bitterly cold, with temperatures falling below zero degrees Fahrenheit. Ninety-one prisoners died in November 1863, and 104 more in December. Conditions at the camp hospital improved over the winter, when the facility was expanded to care for ailing prisoners. Two new, but incomplete, hospital wards were opened in December 1863, increasing the hospital's capacity to 160 patients. More could be accommodated in an emergency. Prisoner deaths numbered 263 that winter.

Confederate prisoners from the area around Chattanooga, Tennessee, arrived at the overcrowded camp at the end of 1863. Blankets and clothing were issued to those in urgent need. Camp rations, while deemed sufficient, lacked fresh vegetables. Prisoners cooked for themselves and were allowed to make small purchases of food from the camp to supplement their diet.

Toward the end of 1863, a new military prison was constructed on the grounds with a capacity of sixty prisoners. In January 1864 thirty men were imprisoned there. Despite the threat of confinement in the new prison, camp's inmates continued to attempt escapes. Punishments included a reduction of rations.

In July 1864 the Confederate prisoner count at Camp Morton reached 4,999. Overcrowded barracks and the July heat caused more illnesses, including cases of malaria. Drinking water obtained from Fall Creek contained limestone, which caused diarrhea among the men. New wards were added to the camp's hospital, but only modest repairs were made to the camp's dilapidated barracks.

During the final months of the war, in February and March 1865, two thousand of Camp Morton's prisoners left as part of a prisoner exchange. Another six hundred prisoners were soon released. Only 1,408 prisoners remained at the camp in April. Following Confederate general Robert E. Lee's surrender on April 9, many of Camp Morton's prisoners were discharged. Only 308 prisoners were left at the camp on June 1, 1865. The camp's last Confederate prisoners were released on June 12, 1865. In addition to the Confederate prisoners, seven Union deserters who remained in custody at Camp Morton were freed. Forty members of the Veteran Reserve Corps, who were serving time in the prison's guardhouse, were given dishonorable discharges and released without pay.

== Confederate burials ==
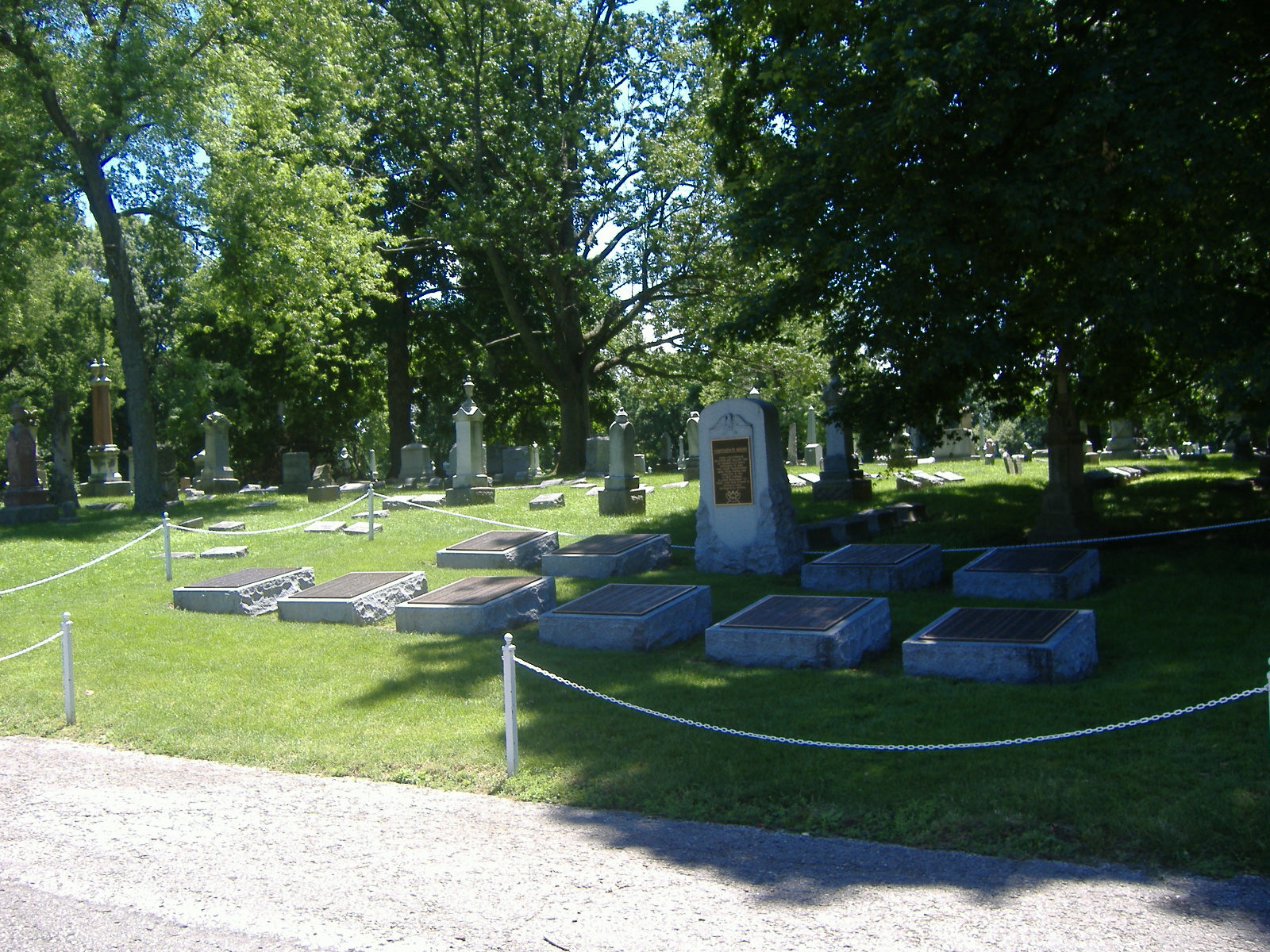
Graves of the Confederate prisoners at Crown Hill Cemetery

It is not known for certain, but it is estimated that approximately 1,700 prisoners died at Camp Morton between 1862 and 1865. Confederate prisoners were buried in wooden coffins in trenches on five lots purchased near the City Cemetery, which was later expanded and became known as Greenlawn Cemetery. The individual gravesites were marked with wooden boards bearing painted identification numbers that were worn away by the passage of time. Some of the Confederates buried in Indianapolis's City Cemetery were exhumed and returned to their families; however, the remains of 1,616 Confederate prisoners were left at Greenlawn. In 1866 a fire ravaged the cemetery office, destroying the records that gave the precise location of the burials.

In the 1870s construction of an engine house and additional tracks for the Vandalia Railroad caused the Confederate prisoners' remains to be removed and reburied in a mass grave at Greenlawn. In 1906 the U.S. government sent Colonel William Elliot to Indianapolis to locate the mass grave, and in 1912 the Confederate Soldiers and Sailors Monument was erected at the site to honor the 1,616 Confederate prisoners of war who were buried at Greenlawn. The monument was moved to Indianapolis's Garfield Park in 1928. The remains from the Confederate gravesite were moved to Indianapolis's Crown Hill Cemetery in 1931 and buried in a mass grave in Section 32. The area became known as the Confederate Mound. In 1993, the names of each fallen Confederate at Camp Morton were inscribed on ten bronze plaques.

== Other site uses ==
Property remaining at Camp Morton after the last prisoners left was sold at public auction in July 1865 and the buildings were vacant by August 2. The city allocated three thousand dollars to rehabilitate the property, and the State Board of Agriculture eventually received $9,816.56 in property damages from the federal government.

The Indiana State Fair returned to the site in 1868 and remained there until 1891, when the State Board of Agriculture sold the grounds in November to three businessmen from Indianapolis for $275,100. In 1891 the State Board of Agriculture acquired property for the new state fairgrounds at its present location on property bounded by Thirty-eighth Street, Fall Creek Parkway, Forty-Second Street, and Winthrop Avenue.

New streets and drainage ditches were constructed on the former Camp Morton site, which was platted and developed as a residential area known as Morton Place. After 1890 the Herron-Morton Place neighborhood became known for its connections with then-president Benjamin Harrison.

== Memorials ==
A bronze bust of Colonel Richard Owen, designed by Belle Kinney Scholz, the daughter of a Confederate soldier, is installed on the main floor of the Indiana Statehouse as a tribute to Owen's service as commandant at Camp Morton in 1862. Southerners contributed $3,000 for the memorial to Owen, who went on to become the first president of Purdue University in 1873. The memorial, which was dedicated on June 9, 1913, honors his fair treatment of the Confederate prisoners. Its inscription reads:"Tribute by Confederate prisoners of war and their friends for his courtesy and kindness."

In 1916, students and teachers of Indianapolis Public School 45 erected a stone monument to mark the location of the camp at Alabama and Nineteenth Streets.

A monument at Indianapolis's Greenlawn Cemetery was erected to honor the Confederate soldiers who were buried there. The monument was moved to Garfield Park in 1928.

A monument and ten bronze plaques were erected at Confederate Mound, in Section 32 of Indianapolis's Crown Hill Cemetery, to honor the Confederate prisoners of war who were originally buried at Greenlawn. Remains of the prisoners were moved to Crown Hill in 1931 and 1,616 names are inscribed on the plaques.

In 1962, the Indiana Civil War Centennial Commission erected a state historical marker in the 1900 block of North Alabama Street, near the site of Camp Morton.

== See also ==
- Indianapolis in the American Civil War
- Civil War POW Prisons and Camps
