= Willard and Josephine Hubbard House =

Historic house in Indiana, United States

- U.S. National Register of Historic Places
- U.S. Historic district – Contributing property
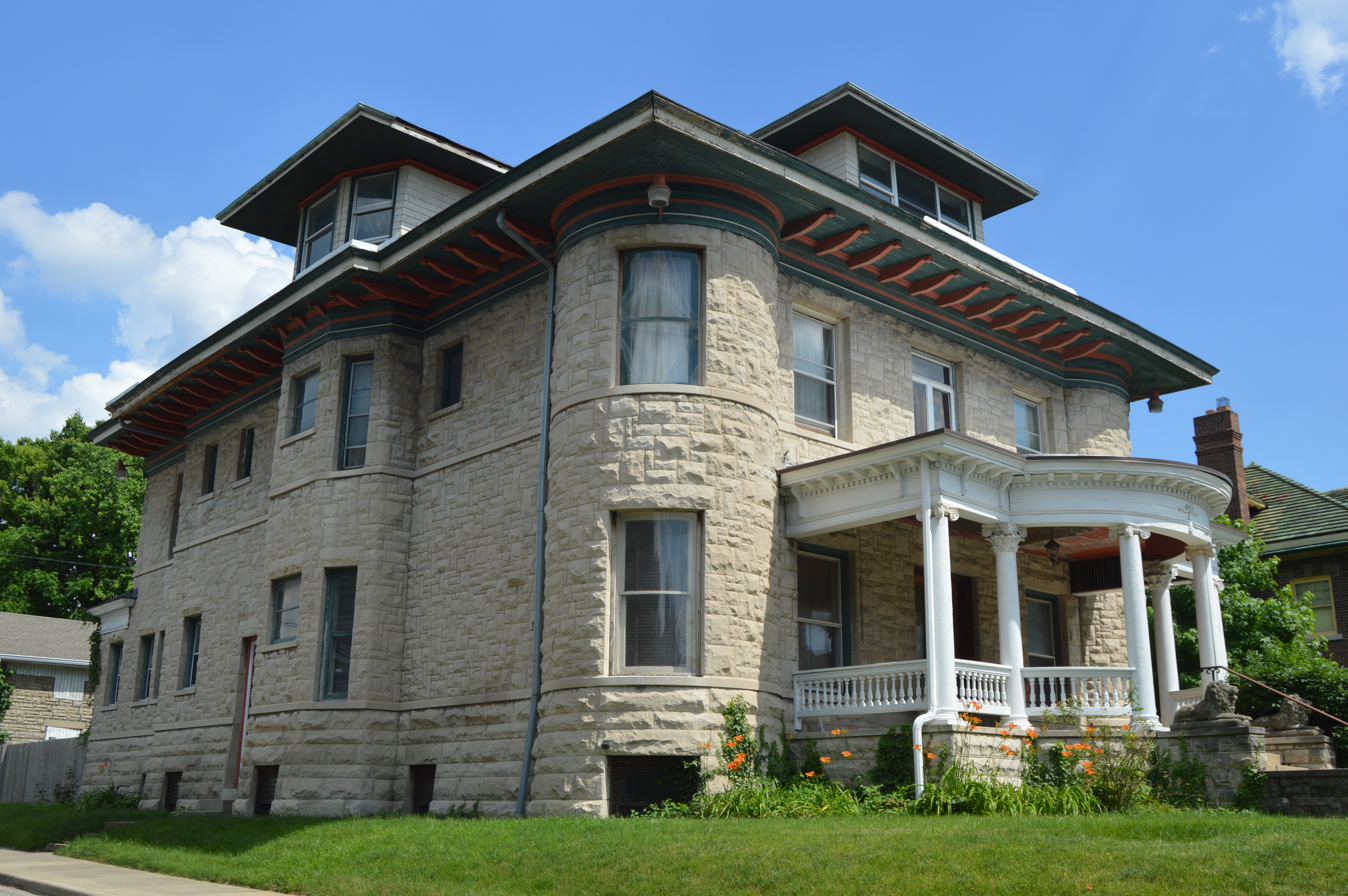
- Willard and Josephine Hubbard House, June 2012

- Location within Indianapolis Location within Indiana Location within the United States
- Location: 1941 N. Delaware St., Indianapolis, Indiana
- Coordinates: 39°47′38″N 86°9′32″W
- Area: less than one acre
- Built: 1903
- Architectural style: Italian Renaissance Revival
- NRHP reference No.: 16000336
- Added to NRHP: June 7, 2016

Willard and Josephine Hubbard House is a historic home located at Indianapolis, Indiana. It was built in 1903, and is a 2 1/2-story, five-bay, center-hall plan, Italian Renaissance Revival style limestone dwelling with an addition. It features a front wooden portico supported by Ionic order columns and a semi-circular front section. Also on the property is a contributing carriage house / garage.

It was listed on the National Register of Historic Places in 2016. It is located in the Herron-Morton Place Historic District.

== See also ==
- National Register of Historic Places listings in Center Township, Marion County, Indiana
