= Indianapolis in the American Civil War =

Overview of Indianapolis' significance during the American Civil War

During the American Civil War, Indianapolis, the state capital of Indiana, was a major base of supplies for the Union. Governor Oliver P. Morton, a major supporter of President Abraham Lincoln, quickly made Indianapolis a gathering place to organize and train troops for the Union army. The city became a major railroad hub for troop transport to Confederate lands, and therefore had military importance. Twenty-four military camps were established in the vicinity of Indianapolis. Camp Morton, the initial mustering ground to organize and train the state's Union volunteers in 1861, was designated as a major prisoner-of-war camp for captured Confederate soldiers in 1862. In addition to military camps, a state-owned arsenal was established in the city in 1861, and a federal arsenal in 1862. A Soldiers' Home and a Ladies' Home were established in Indianapolis to house and feed Union soldiers and their families as they passed through the city. Indianapolis residents also supported the Union cause by providing soldiers with food, clothing, equipment, and supplies, despite rising prices and wartime hardships, such as food and clothing shortages. Local doctors aided the sick, some area women provided nursing care, and Indianapolis City Hospital tended to wounded soldiers. Indianapolis sent an estimated 4,000 men into military service; an estimated 700 died during the war. Indianapolis's Crown Hill National Cemetery was established as one of two national military cemeteries established in Indiana in 1866.

During the war, the city's population increased with the arrival of new businesses and industries that offered additional employment opportunities, spurred real estate development, and ushered in the beginning of the city's urban, industrial development. In addition, street crime was prevalent, causing the city government to increase its police force and local merchants to hire private security. The era was also a time of bitter political disputes between Indiana's Democrats and Republicans. In May 1863, in an incident sarcastically called the Battle of Pogue's Run, Union soldiers stopped and searched two departing trainloads of delegates to a statewide Democratic convention, many of whom tossed their personal weapons into a nearby creek. In July 1863 Indianapolis residents feared an attack from Confederate forces during Morgan's Raid into southern Indiana, but the Confederates turned east toward Ohio and never came to the city.

After the war, increased wartime manufacturing and industrial growth ushered in a new era of economic prosperity, and Indianapolis's population increased from 8,000 in 1850 to 45,000 at the end of 1864. A real-estate boom led to the establishment of new residential suburbs, but the city retained its slums. Indianapolis also experienced improvements to its public services, such as health care, utilities, street railways, and public schools. By 1880 Indianapolis was Indiana's commercial and industrial center. Construction for the Soldiers' and Sailors' Monument began in 1888, in the center of downtown Indianapolis, after decades of discussion. The city's iconic monument was dedicated on May 15, 1902.

== War years ==
During the American Civil War, Indianapolis served as a gathering place for organizing troops. As Indianapolis's citizens rallied in support of the Union, its population increased with the arrival of new businesses and industries that offered additional employment opportunities and spurred real estate development. City residents experienced rising prices and wartime hardships, such as food and clothing shortages. It was also a time of bitter political disputes between Indiana's Democrats and Republicans. The Civil War era ushered in the beginning of the city's urban, industrial development, its connections to an expanding railroad network, and the growth of local charitable organizations.

=== 1861 ===
During the winter of 1860–1861, there was talk throughout the region of a possible of war with the South, but Indianapolis had only four militia groups ready to fight: the National Guards, the City Greys, the Indianapolis Independent Zouaves, and the Zouave Guards. On January 7, 1861, the Indianapolis Zouaves volunteered for service if Indiana's governor, Oliver P. Morton, requested it, but they were not needed until spring. On February 11, 1861, President-elect Abraham Lincoln arrived in Indianapolis, one of several train stops he made en route to Washington, D.C., for his presidential inauguration. The pre-inauguration stop made Lincoln the first president-elect to visit Indianapolis. Two months later, the United States was on the brink of war.

On April 12, news arrived in Indianapolis via telegraph that Confederate forces had opened fire on Fort Sumter, a federal fort in the harbor at Charleston, South Carolina. On April 13, two mass meetings were held in Indianapolis, where resolutions were approved to support the Union. Indianapolis citizens proclaimed, "We unite as one man to repel all treasonable assaults upon the Government, its people, and citizens in every department of the Union––peaceably, if we can, forcibly if we must."

On April 15, 1861, President Lincoln responded to the surrender of the federal fort after the Battle of Fort Sumter by calling for 75,000 volunteers to join the Union army and restore order. Governor Morton telegraphed Lincoln offering 10,000 Hoosier men to defend the country, but the state's initial quota was set at six regiments (a total of 4,683 men) for three months of service. Orders were issued on April 16 to form Indiana's first regiments and establish Indianapolis a gathering point for volunteers to enlist. On the first day, 500 men were encamped in the city. Within a week, more than 12,000 recruits had signed up to fight for the Union, nearly three times as many needed to meet the state's initial quota.

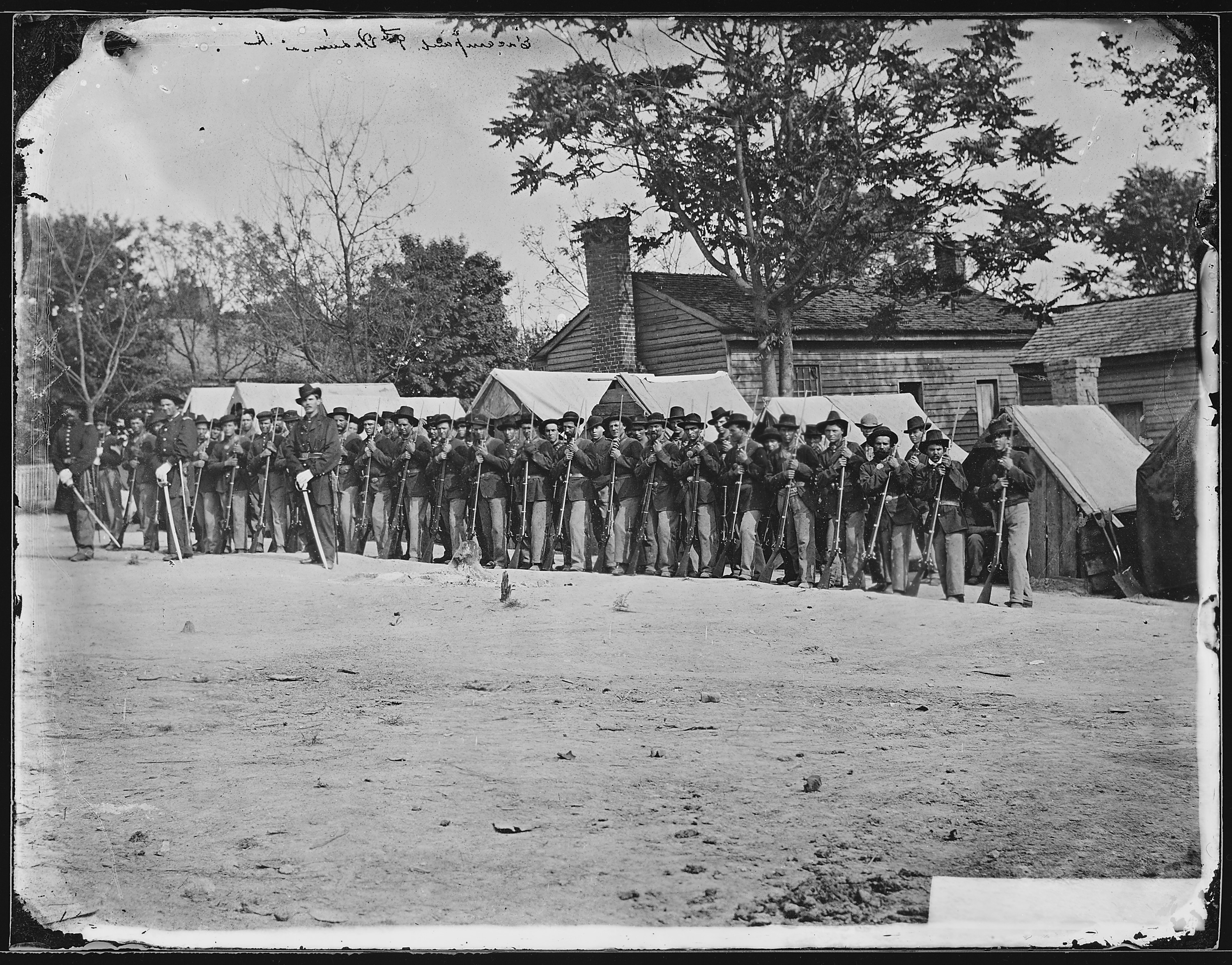
9th Indiana Infantry Regiment

Governor Morton and Lew Wallace, Indiana's adjutant general, quickly established Camp Morton on the former grounds of the Indiana State Fair (along Alabama Street, north of the city) as the initial mustering ground to organize and train the state's Union volunteers. The camp's first soldiers arrived on April 17. During the war a total of 24 military camps were established in the vicinity of Indianapolis, including Camp Sullivan, Camp Morton, Camp Burnside, Camp Freemont, and Camp Carrington, which was the state's largest.

On April 20 Indianapolis's city council appropriated $10,000 for wartime use. Four days later, the Indiana General Assembly convened in Indianapolis to give the governor wartime powers and appropriate funds to support the war effort ($1.6 million for military purposes and a $2 million bond issue for state and national defense). To provide ammunition, Governor Morton established a state-owned arsenal at Indianapolis. Congress passed legislation to establish a permanent federal arsenal at Indianapolis in 1862.

By April 27, 1861, Indiana's first six regiments, all of which were organized at Indianapolis, were fully organized as the First Brigade, Indiana Volunteers, under the command of Brigadier General Thomas A. Morris. These included the 6th Indiana, the 7th Indiana, the 8th Indiana, the 9th Indiana, the 10th Indiana, and the 11th Indiana infantry regiments.

Slightly more than sixty percent (104) of Indiana's total regiments mustered into service and trained at Indianapolis. Men from Indianapolis and surrounding Marion County, Indiana, served in 39 regiments. In total, Indianapolis sent an estimated 4,000 men into the service. The first resident of Indianapolis to die in the war was Private John C. Hollenbeck, of Company B, 11th Indiana. He died near Romney, Virginia on June 27, 1861. An estimated 700 Indianapolis residents died during the war.

The 11th Indiana Volunteer Infantry Regiment, also known as the Indiana Zouaves, was the first regiment organized in Indiana during the war and the first one to leave Indianapolis, on May 8, 1861. All four of Indianapolis's militia units (National Guards, the City Greys, the Indianapolis Independent Zouaves, and the Zouave Guards), and an additional company of men from Indianapolis, became part of the regiment. Wallace, who resigned as Indiana's adjutant general to take command of the 11th Indiana, went on to become a major general in the Union army. First Lieutenant Frederick Knefler, another Indianapolis resident, was an officer from Company H, 11th Indiana, who eventually rose to the rank of brevet brigadier general and became the highest-ranking Jewish military officer in the Union. Francis A. Shoup, also from Indianapolis, briefly led the Independent Zouaves before the war, but he decided to go south and ultimately became a brigadier general in the Confederate States Army.

Most of Indiana's regimental units were organized within towns or counties, but ethnic units also formed. The 32nd Indiana, the state's first German-American infantry regiment, and the 35th Indiana, the state's first Irish-American regiment, organized at Indianapolis in 1861. Other regiments established in 1861 that included residents of Indianapolis and Marion County, Indiana, included the 19th Indiana, the 27th Indiana, and the 33rd Indiana, among others.

There was little doubt that the majority of Indianapolis residents supported the Union. The city became a hub for Union troop organization and training. Pro-Union mobs would sometimes force individuals suspected of Confederate sympathies to take an oath of loyalty at the mayor's office. The most notable of these was J. J. Bingham, the editor of the Indianapolis Sentinel. A mob forced Bingham to take a loyalty oath after articles critical of his political views appeared in the Indianapolis Journal.

=== 1862 ===
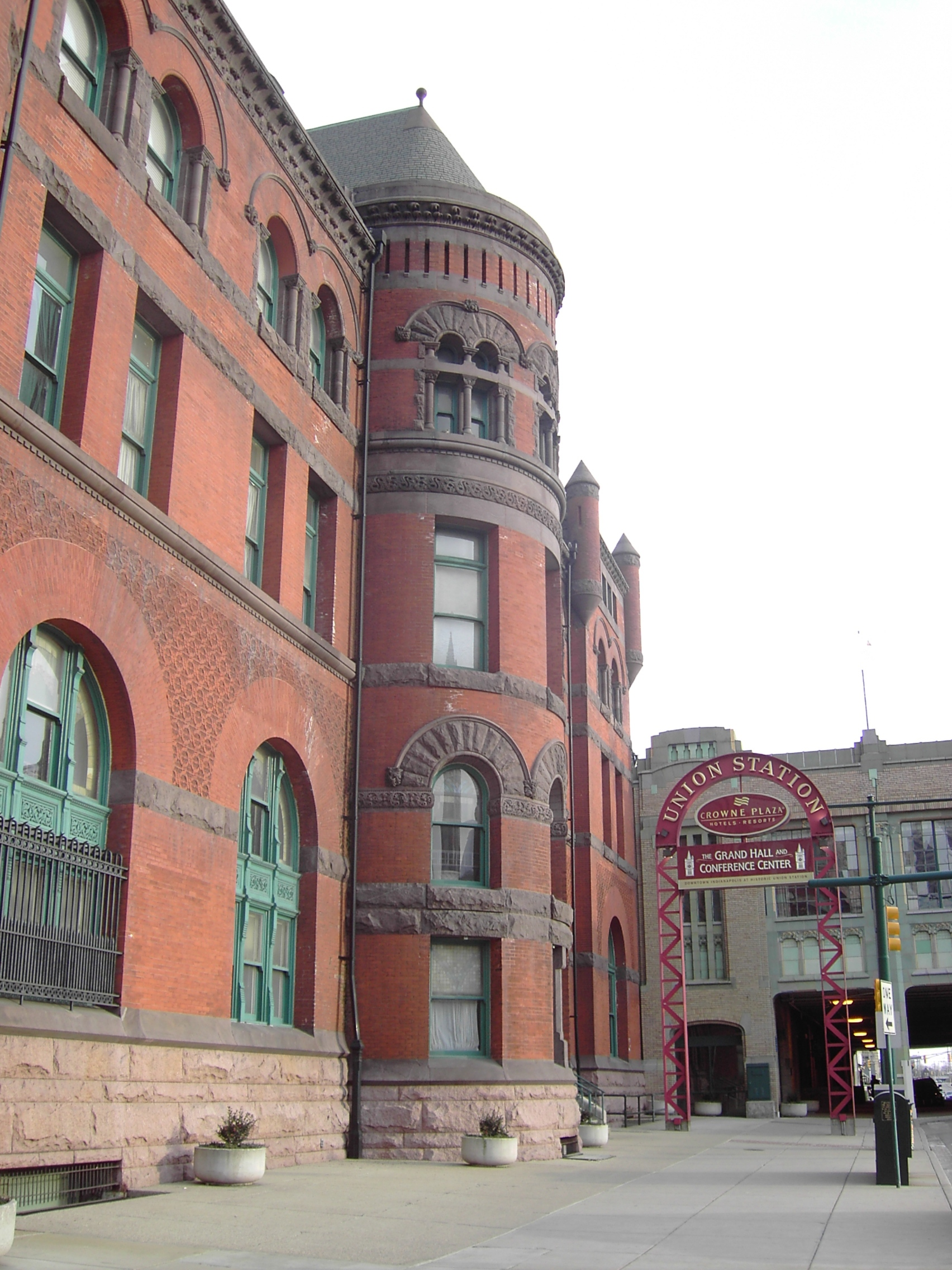
Union Station

Union troops continued to organize and train at military camps in the city, as battles in Kentucky and Tennessee caused major changes to Indianapolis. After the battles of Fort Henry and Fort Donelson, the Union began to collect a large number of Confederate prisoners of war for transport to the North. Governor Morton volunteered to hold some of the prisoners at Indianapolis. Designated as one of four northern prisoner-of-war camps, Camp Morton was converted into one of the Union's largest prisons for captured Confederate soldiers.

Camp Morton's first Confederate prisoners arrived on February 22–23, 1862. Many of the 2,398 Confederates in the first group were sick, ill fed, and without sufficient clothing for the cold, northern winters. The citizens of Indianapolis rallied to provide humanitarian aid for the prisoners, which included additional food, clothing, and supplies. Local doctors aided the sick and local women provided nursing care. The Athenaeum, at the corner of East Michigan Street and Massachusetts Avenue, and another local building were converted into hospitals to treat the Confederate prisoners. For the remainder of the war, Camp Morton typically housed between 3,000 and 6,000 prisoners.

As regiments organized and reorganized, Union soldiers continued to gather at Indianapolis, sometimes as many as 12,000 at a time. Indianapolis regiments formed in 1862 included the 70th Indiana, under the command of Benjamin Harrison, and the 79th Indiana, under the command of Frederick Knefler. Popular gathering spots for the soldiers included Monument Circle and University Park. A Soldiers' Home and a Ladies' Home were established in Indianapolis in 1862 and in 1863, respectively, to house and feed Indiana's soldiers and their families as they passed through Indianapolis. City residents continued to aid Union soldiers by providing food, clothing, equipment, and supplies. Soldiers' aid societies and the Indiana Sanitary Commission, established in 1862 with its headquarters in Indianapolis, raised funds and gathered supplies for troops in the field. The women of Indianapolis also organized groups, usually local Ladies' Aid Societies, to provide soldiers with blankets and clothing, and helped raise funds for additional troop supplies.

Street crime was prevalent in Indianapolis during the war. The city government increased its police force, local merchants hired private security, and guards were posted at Union Station to deal with law-enforcement issues. Fights, robberies, gambling, prostitution, and drunkenness became significant problems. Prohibition of alcohol sales had to be established in the city. Because there was so much street violence, city police never bothered to discover who murdered an officer from Pennsylvania. The bodies of many deceased soldiers killed in the war were held at Indianapolis's Union Station, awaiting transport to their eventual burial spots.

Several Indiana facilities cared for wounded soldiers, including Indianapolis City Hospital. Governor Morton and the Indiana Sanitary Commission began recruiting women to work as nurses at military hospitals and ships in January 1863.

The city was also the wartime home of Richard Jordan Gatling, a physician and entrepreneur, who invented the Gatling gun. Tested in Indianapolis and patented in November 1862, the hand-cranked, rapid-fire gun was a predecessor to the modern machine gun. The U.S. Navy adopted the Gatling gun during the war, where it was used on federal gunboats, but the U.S. Army did not formally adopt it for use until 1866.

=== 1863 ===
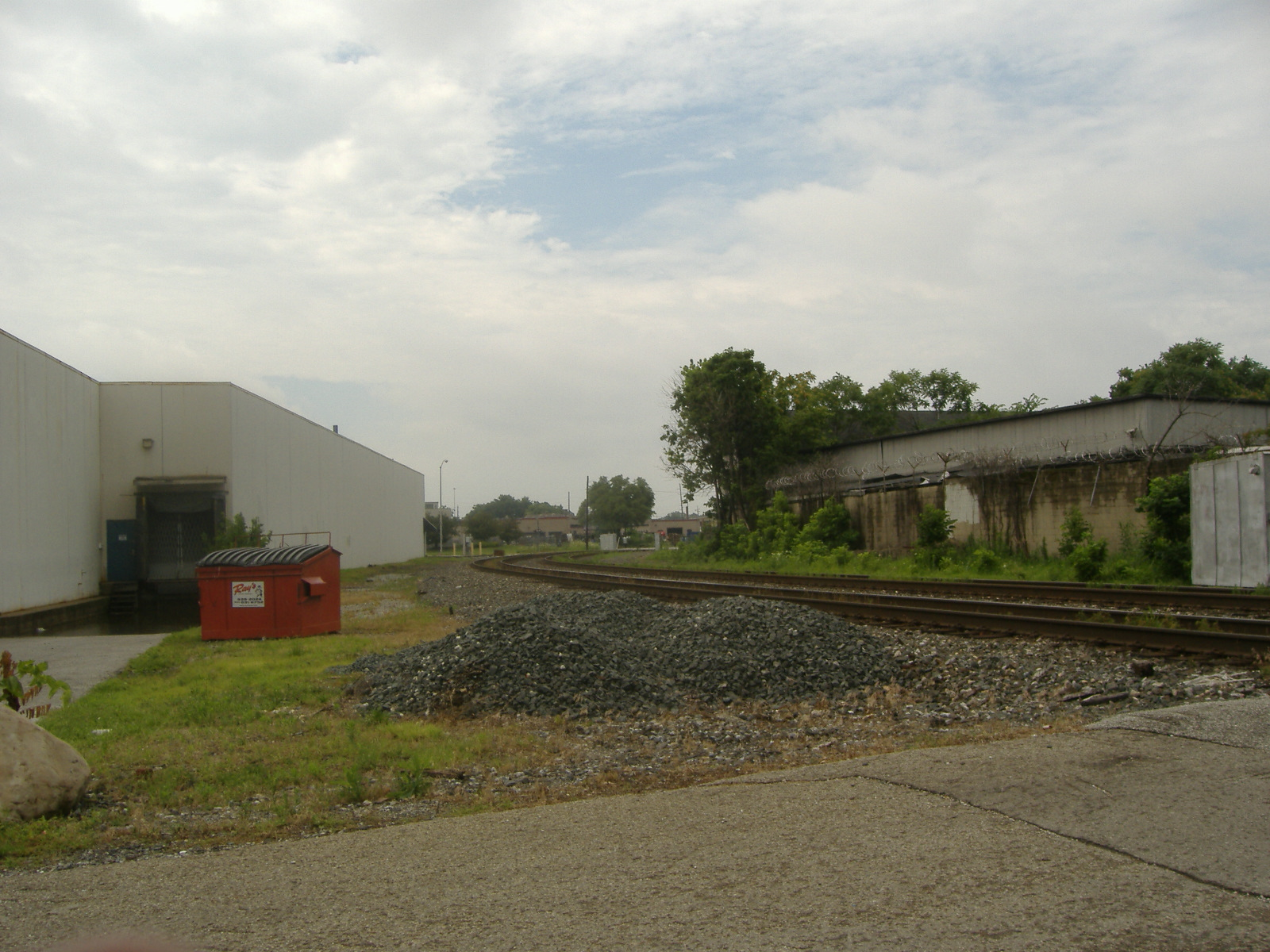
Site of the Battle of Pogue's Run

The first military execution in the war's western theater occurred on March 27, 1863, at Camp Burnside (Burnside Barracks). Robert Gay, a 27-year-old schoolteacher from Clay County, Indiana, was executed by a 20-man firing squad. After his capture by Confederates at Richmond, Kentucky, Gay declared allegiance to the Confederate States of America to escape further army service. After his return to Indiana, Gay was convicted of treason and executed, but not before he apologized for what he had done. Other executions took place in 1864, when three bounty jumpers were executed at Burnside Barracks.

Major political differences between Democrats and Republicans and wartime propaganda caused many Hoosiers to become suspicious of dissenters and fearful of potential insurrections, especially from secret societies sympathetic to the South. During the Indianapolis city election In May, the Democrats, who decided a fair election could not be held, withdrew their ticket. Only 14 votes were cast for Democratic candidates in the nine Indianapolis wards.

Prior to a state Democratic convention in May, rumors had spread that members of a secret society, who were planning to attend the convention in Indianapolis, were plotting to attack Camp Morton and the state arsenal. In response to the perceived threat, soldiers were posted to guard the city and protect government property. On May 20 Union soldiers attempted to the convention, forcing the proceedings to be adjourned. Elsewhere in the city, men were arrested for carrying concealed weapons or taken into custody for further questioning. After the convention adjourned, Union soldiers stopped and searched two departing trainloads of convention delegates, demanding that the passengers surrender their personal weapons. The soldiers seized "several hundred" weapons, while the passengers tossed others into Pogue's Run, a nearby creek. The incident, later called the Battle of Pogue's Run, caused no serious trouble, but it did illustrate the intensity of the state's ongoing political feuds. The Republicans used the seized weapons as evidence that the Democrats were disloyal to the Union and guilty of treasonable plots.

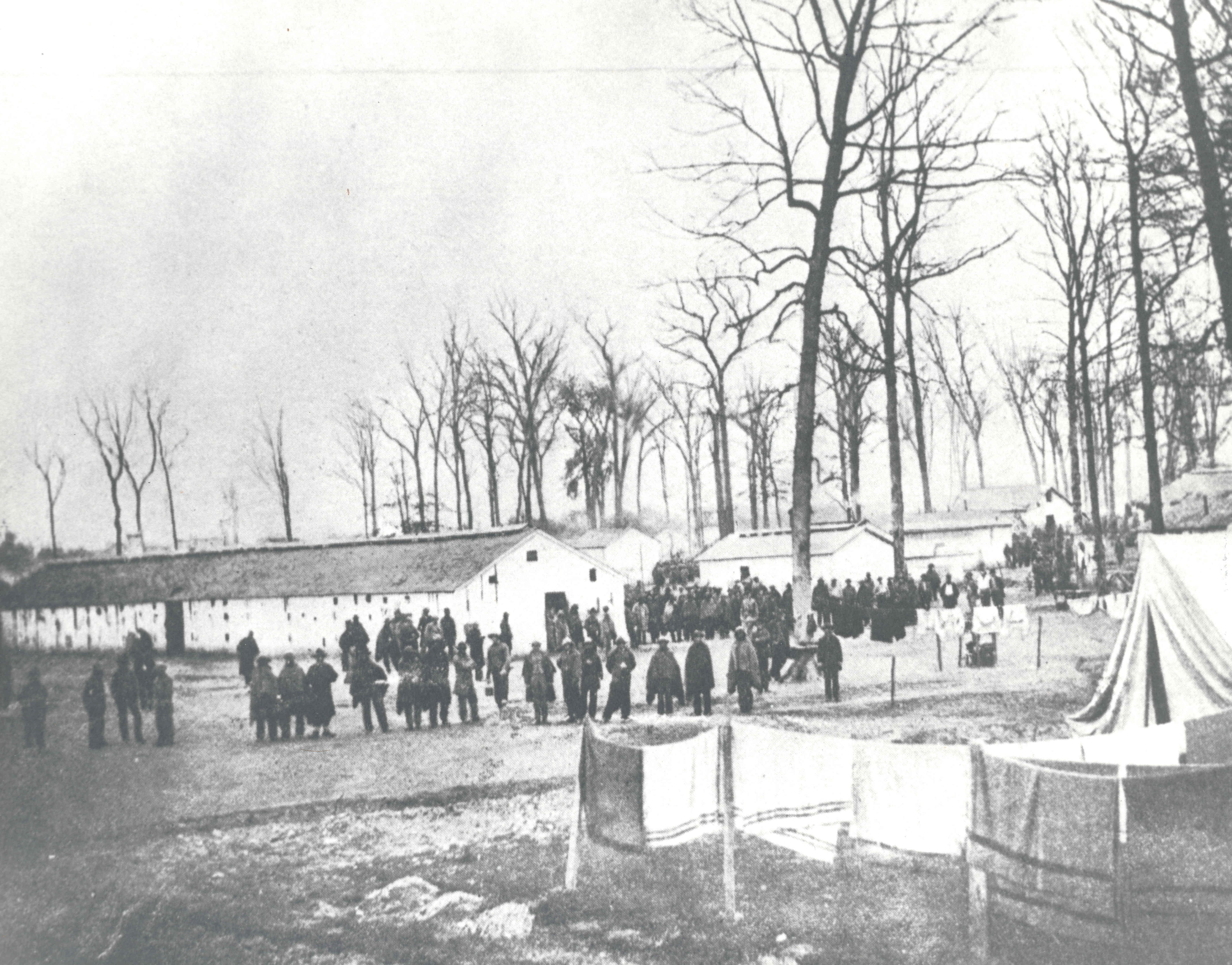
Camp Morton

Rumors of plots to overthrow Morton and Indiana's government continued during the summer. On July 8, 1863, when Confederate general John Hunt Morgan crossed the Ohio River with 2,400 troopers, Indiana went into a state of emergency. Only the day before, the citizens of Indianapolis were rejoicing over the Union victories at Vicksburg, Mississippi, and Gettysburg, Pennsylvania. The city's mood turned to panic when Morgan's troops appeared to be headed toward Indianapolis. Many Hoosiers feared Morgan would attack the city and attempt to free the Confederate prisoners at Camp Morton. The panic was increased as Morgan's telegrapher, "Lightning" Ellsworth, posing as various Union telegraphers, claimed Morgan had far more men than he actually did. Ellsworth also sent false information suggesting Morgan would attack Indianapolis, among other locations. Within forty-eight hours an estimated 65,000 Indiana volunteers had assembled to fight the Confederate raiders. Five regiments encamped on the grounds of the Indiana Statehouse were prepared to defend the state capital. Tension in the city ended on July 14, when it was confirmed that Morgan had left Indiana and entered Ohio. Morgan was captured on July 26. Volunteers who served in the temporary regiments at Indianapolis mustered out of service on July 17, once the threat from Morgan's troops was gone. An accident caused by the explosion of ammunition in a caisson killed a boy, three soldiers, and two horses as some of the soldiers were departing town.

=== 1864 ===
New regiments continued to muster into service at Indianapolis. The 28th Regiment U.S. Colored Troops, organized between December 24, 1863, and March 31, 1864, was the only black regiment formed in Indiana during the war. The regiment trained at Camp Fremont, near Fountain Square. It included 518 enlisted men who signed on for a term of three years, but the war was effectively over within a year, cutting short its term of service. The regiment lost 212 men before it mustered out of service on November 8, 1865.

Indianapolis's "City Regiment" mustered into service as the 132nd Indiana Infantry Regiment in May 1864 as one of several regiments of Hundred Days Men. The regiment guarded railroads in Tennessee and Alabama, which were firmly in the control of Union forces, to relieve the regular U.S. army troops for active duty on the front lines. The 132nd Indiana, which was formed mostly of young boys and older men, was a favorite among Indianapolis citizens. Twelve of its members of disease before the regiment returned home.

Beginning in September 1864, Indianapolis was the site of the trials by a military commission of several men accused and convicted of treason. In a landmark civil liberty case that became known as Ex parte Milligan, the U.S. Supreme Court overturned the convictions, On April 3, 1866, the Court ruled that the military trial was illegal because the civilian courts were open and functioning during the war. Following the Court's ruling, the men were released.

A sanitary fair was held in Indianapolis in October as part of the Indiana State Fair.

=== 1865 ===
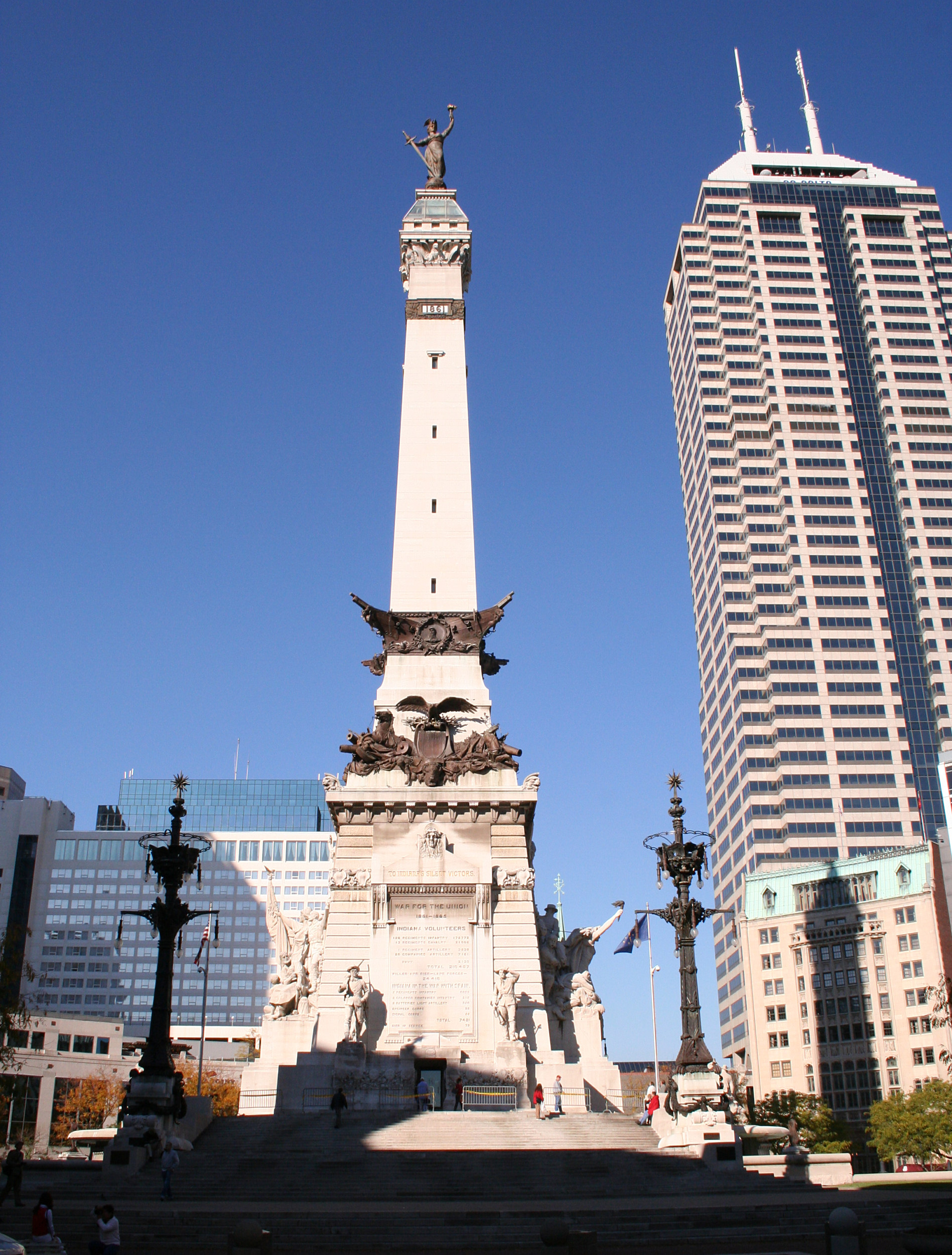
The Soldiers & Sailors Monument in Indianapolis was built to honor the war dead.

News of Confederate General Robert E. Lee's surrender at Appomattox Courthouse, Virginia, reached Indianapolis at 11 p.m. on April 9, 1865, causing wild, public celebrations that the Indianapolis Journal characterized as "demented." The celebrations soon turned to sadness when news of the assassination of President Lincoln arrived on April 15. Lincoln's funeral train passed through the city on April 30, en route to Springfield, Illinois. An estimated 100,000 people waited in long lines to pass Lincoln's bier at the Indiana Statehouse, where the president's remains lay in state.

Indianapolis residents saw much activity in the drawdown of military forces at the end of the war. The last military troops organized in Indianapolis was the 156th Indiana, which mustered into service on April 12 for a year of service. In June formal receptions honored soldiers who returned home. On June 12 the last Confederate prisoner was parrolled at Camp Morton. On July 25 a military wagon train, 28 miles (45 km) in length, passed through the city. By the autumn of 1865 the city's Soldiers' Home and Ladies' Home had closed, as did most of the city's military camps after the soldiers left Indianapolis.

== Aftermath ==
Indiana's economic situation improved after the war, particularly in Indianapolis; its population increased from 8,000 in 1850 to 45,000 people at the end of 1864. The city's population exceeded 75,000 by 1880. As a result of the war, the city experienced a real-estate boom. Real-estate transactions increased from more than $1 million in 1860 to more than $5 million by 1870. New residential suburbs, such as Irvington and Woodruff Place, were established, but Indianapolis still retained its slum areas. As the city grew, it also experienced a need for more public services, such as utilities and street railways, as well as an improved public school system. A street railway came to the city in the 1860s, the city established its first sewage system in 1869, most of the city's downtown streets were illuminated with gaslights by 1870, and the first water supplied from a central waterworks was delivered to city residents in 1871. Health care in the city also improved. Indianapolis City Hospital was equipped and staffed to begin treatment of civilian patients in 1866.

Increased wartime manufacturing and industrial growth ushered in a new era of economic prosperity and the rise of labor unions in the city. By 1880 Indianapolis was Indiana's commercial and industrial center. New industries in Indianapolis included pork-packing plants and foundries, as well as numerous manufacturers, small businesses, retail shops, and banks. In 1876 Colonel Eli Lilly opened a new pharmaceutical laboratory on Indianapolis's Pearl Street, founding what later became Eli Lilly and Company. The Union Railroad Transfer and Stock Yards Company, another major employer, opened in 1877. After the war, Indianapolis continued to develop into a transportation hub. Existing railroad lines expanded and new ones were established, linking Indianapolis to other cities across the nation.

Indianapolis residents continued to assist those in need. Veterans programs were initiated to help wounded soldiers with housing, food, and other basic necessities. New orphanages and asylums joined the Indianapolis Orphans' Home, chartered in 1850, to aid women and children. The German Protestant Orphans' Association was organized in 1867. The Indianapolis Asylum for Friendless Colored Children, the state's only orphanage for African American children, was established in 1870. Other major charitable groups included the Indianapolis Benevolent Society and the Indianapolis Flower Mission, both organized in 1876.

When the South returned to firm Democratic control at the end of the 1870s, Indiana became a key swing state, one of a few that often decided the outcome of national elections. Five Indiana politicians were vice-presidential nominees on the major party tickets in elections held between 1868 and 1916. Benjamin Harrison, an Indianapolis lawyer and former officer in the Union army, was elected the 23rd president of the United States in 1888.

== Memorials and tributes ==
In 1866, Indianapolis's Crown Hill National Cemetery was established within the grounds of Crown Hill Cemetery, a privately owned cemetery northwest of downtown. It is one of two national military cemeteries established in Indiana as a result of the war. That same year, the first Union soldiers' bodies that had been buried elsewhere in the city during the war were reinterred at Crown Hill.

In November 1866, the city continued to honor the service of Civil War veterans as the host of the first national Grand Army of the Republic encampment.

The Soldiers' and Sailors' Monument in downtown Indianapolis was erected to honor Indiana veterans of the Civil War. Construction began in 1888 after two decades of discussion. The monument was completed in 1901 and dedicated on May 15, 1902.

The Confederate Soldiers and Sailors Monument was commissioned by the U.S. federal government in 1912 to memorialize the 1,616 Confederate soldiers buried in a mass grave at Indianapolis's Greenlawn Cemetery. When the dead were reinterred at Crown Hill National Cemetery beginning in 1928, the monument was moved to Garfield Park, where it remained until its dismantling in June 2020.

== See also ==
- Indiana in the American Civil War
- History of Indianapolis
