= Talbott Street Theater =

Nightclub in Indianapolis, Indiana, US (1920–2016)

- Address: 2143 N. Talbott Street; Indianapolis, Indiana; United States

Construction
- Opened: 1920
- Closed: June 25, 2016

Tenants
- Coronet Theater, Encore Theater, Black Curtain Dinner Theater, The Talbott

Talbott Street Theater was a popular nightclub for the LGBT community in Indianapolis. Talbott Street opened in the 1920s as a theater for silent movies. During the 1980s it became a well-known club for the gay community. The bar closed permanently on June 25, 2016. In announcing the closing, the Talbott's social media observed that the club had served as a safe space LGBT persons for more than a decade.

== History ==
The Talbott was built in the 1920s on Talbott Street near 22nd Street in what became known as the Herron-Morton neighborhood in Indianapolis. The building was designed by George V. Bedell and included over 1,000 seats for a silent movie venue. An affluent neighborhood at the end of the 19th century, the area began to decline economically as many wealthier Indianapolis residents moved to suburbs. During this time the building was occupied by a series of theaters and bars including Coronet Theater, Encore Theater, and the Black Curtain Dinner Theater.

However, by the 1970s the neighborhood was known as a refuge for counter-cultural communities. By 1981 the neighborhood included two popular LGBT clubs, Talbott Street Disco and the 21st Club. Relations with the neighborhood, however, were not always easy. For example, in the early 1980s the Herron-Morton Place neighborhood association complained that the bar made parking difficult, made litter a problem, and increased prostitution. The association made a failed attempt to challenge the bar's liquor license.

Michael Strapulos, a dentist, purchased the theater and worked with Scott Massey to redesign the facility. They visited nightclubs in Miami, New York City, and elsewhere to gather ideas. They renovated the building to include three areas, each with a different atmosphere.

== Reception ==
The Talbott was frequently recognized in NUVO reader-polls as the best place to see a drag show. It was also known as a dance hall and included a Studio 54-style dance floor.

In 2003 the club owner, Michael Strapulos, and designer, Scott Massey, won a design award from Indy Interiors for best interior design for a commercial space.

== Closure ==
The Talbott closed permanently on June 25, 2016. In announcing the closure on social media, the Talbott reflected on the recent mass shooting at the Pulse nightclub in Orlando and reiterated that safe places for LGBT patrons were needed. However, the owner's cousin insisted that the closure was not a response to the violence in Orlando.

The building that remained became a restaurant called, Baby's Indy. The restaurant honored the building's history by preserving some details, decorating with bright decor and neon signs, and hosting a drag brunch on Sundays.
