= Herron–Morton Place Historic District =

Historic district in Indiana, United States

- U.S. National Register of Historic Places
- U.S. Historic district
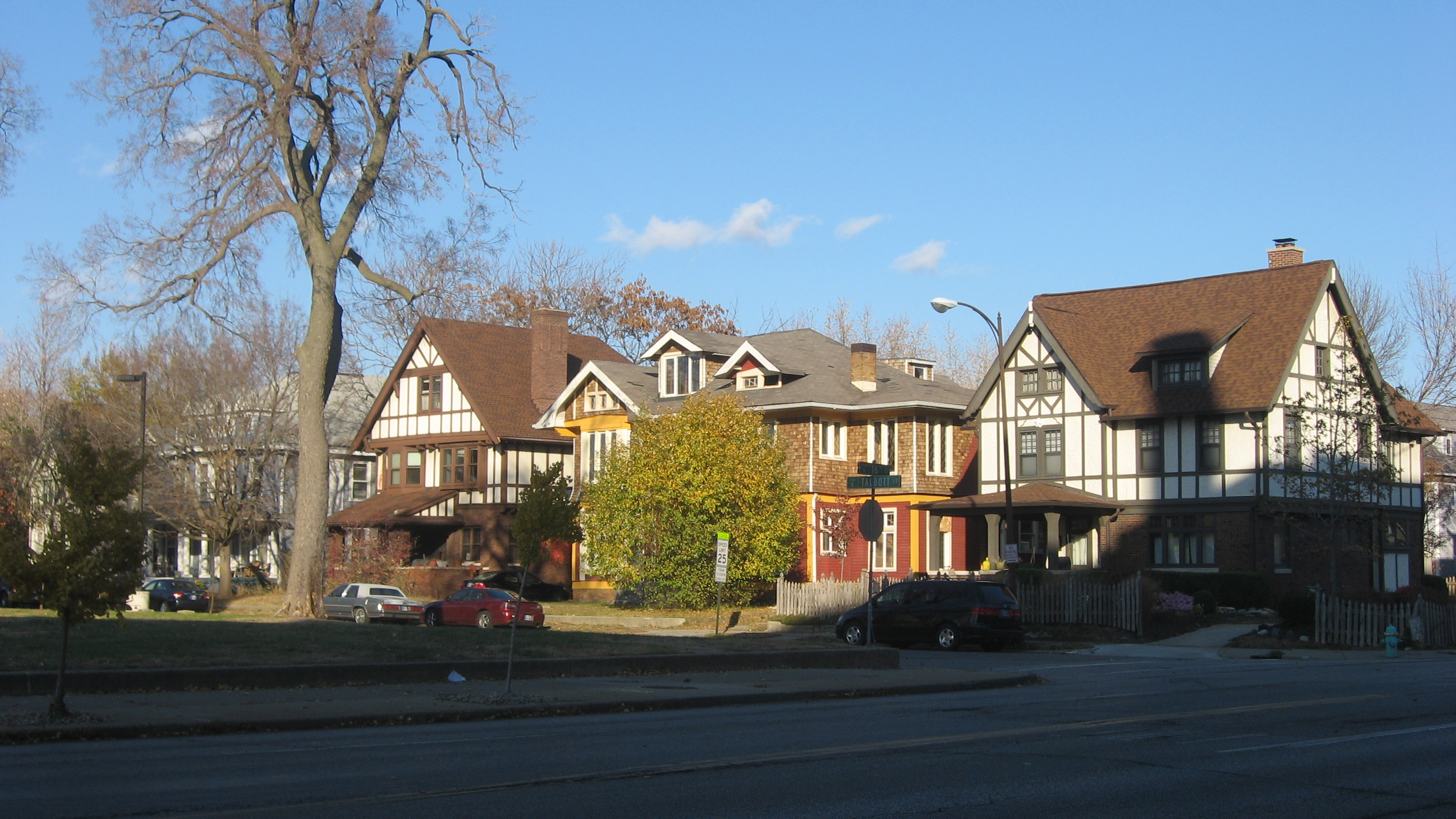
- Talbott Street in the southwestern part of the district

- Location within Indianapolis Location within Indiana Location within the United States
- Location: Roughly bounded by Central Ave., 16th, Pennsylvania, and 22nd Sts., Indianapolis, Indiana
- Coordinates: 39°47′34″N 86°9′9″W
- Area: 147 acres (59 ha)
- Built: 1822
- Architect: Multiple
- Architectural style: Classical Revival, Queen Anne, Tudor Revival
- NRHP reference No.: 83000131
- Added to NRHP: June 16, 1983

Herron–Morton Place is an affluent historic district in Indianapolis, Indiana, United States. The boundaries of the neighborhood are East 16th Street on the south, East 22nd Street on the north, North Pennsylvania Street on the west, and Central Avenue on the east. Historically recognized as one of the city's most prestigious addresses, the district is celebrated for its stately late 19th- and early 20th-century architecture and its role as a cultural anchor for the city's elite.

Herron–Morton Place Historic District is known for its collection of late 19th- and early 20th-century residential architecture. Many north–south streets in Herron—Morton (including Delaware, Alabama, and New Jersey streets) originally featured large esplanades down the center, adding to the spacious feeling of the lots and large homes. Only New Jersey Street retains the original esplanades, providing an example of what the northern half of the neighborhood looked like.

The neighborhood is notable as one of the city's earliest centers for LGBTQ culture, previously home to several gay bars and nightclubs, including the Club Betty K, 21 Club, Johnnie's Place, Harlow's, and Talbott Street. Herron-Morton is home to the building which once housed the United States' first barbershop owned by an African-American woman.

== History ==
=== 19th century ===
The area that makes up Herron-Morton Place was originally part of a 160-acre (65 ha) land patent granted to Thomas O’Neal in November 1822. In 1835, O'Neal sold the land to Samuel Henderson, the first Indianapolis postmaster and later, first mayor (1847–1849). The land was largely undeveloped, except for a 36-acre (15 ha) wooded tract, bounded roughly by what are now 19th, Talbott, and 22nd streets and Central Avenue. In the middle of the 19th century, it had become a popular picnic spot known as Henderson's Grove. In 1850, Henderson sold the land. Eighty acres (32 ha) west of Delaware Street were purchased by Elizabeth Tinker (the namesake of Tinker Street), and the area east of Delaware Street was purchased by William Otis.

In 1859, the Indiana State Board of Agriculture purchased the land, which was still largely undeveloped, as a home for the Indiana State Fair.

At the start of the American Civil War, the area was used as an induction center for the Indiana Volunteer Infantry. Later in the war, it served as Camp Morton, a prisoner of war camp for Confederate soldiers that was named after Indiana's governor at the time, Oliver P. Morton. After the Civil War, it went back to being the state fairgrounds. A new exhibition building designed by Edwin May (later architect of the second, and current Indiana Statehouse) was constructed in 1873. The State Fair was held annually on the site until the current fairgrounds site on 38th Street was created in 1890.

After the relocation of the fairgrounds, the site was purchased by three local businessmen, Willard Hubbard, Edward Claypool, and Elijah Martindale, who divided the property into 280 residential lots named Morton Place. It was designed as an upper-class residential neighborhood, boasting amenities such as esplanades, including those still present on North New Jersey Street.

Indiana Impressionist artists T.C. Steele and William Forsyth founded the Hoosier Group art school in Morton Place in 1888. In 1895, John Herron's bequest of $200,000 (equivalent to $7,700,000 in 2026) founded the John Herron Art Institute and funded new construction of a new main building and an art museum in Morton Place. The Herron Museum later became the Indianapolis Museum of Art.

As Indianapolis expanded outward at the end of the 1800s, the area directly north of 16th Street was considered one of the city's most elegant residential neighborhoods and was home to many celebrated politicians, lawyers, physicians, business leaders, artists, and architects.

=== 20th century ===
The proliferation of the automobile and subsequent expansion of Indianapolis lured the well-to-do further away from the heart of the city and thus, from Herron-Morton. The esplanades on Delaware and Alabama Streets were removed in the 1920s because they slowed traffic flow in and out of the city. When the Great Depression began, many of the large single-family homes were divided into multi-family dwellings, causing the neighborhood to further lose its appeal. Between 1950 and 1970, a considerable amount of housing stock was lost to fires and demolitions.

Revitalization efforts began in the 1970s, largely with graduates of the Herron School of Art choosing to stay in the neighborhood and buy and renovate homes. In 1976, Herron–Morton Place Neighborhood Association was founded. The association spearheaded attempts to renovate homes, reduce crime, and rebuild the neighborhood spirit. Herron-Morton was listed on the National Register of Historic Places in 1983, making structures in the district eligible for tax incentives, and became a historic preservation district in 1986.

=== 21st century ===
Public and private revitalization efforts have continued throughout the past several decades. Herron-Morton is again one of Indianapolis's most highly developed neighborhoods, and many homes that had been converted into multiple units in the 1930s, 1940s, and 1950s have now been converted back into single-family homes. The historic district is notable for its "outstanding collection" of architecture, and encompasses 574 contributing buildings in representative examples of Classical Revival, Queen Anne, and Tudor Revival style architecture.

Herron School of Art and Design relocated to new buildings on the Indiana University-Purdue University Indianapolis campus in 2000 and 2005. The original Herron School of Art buildings now house Herron High School, a top-ranked public charter school serving grades 9–12, and Herron Preparatory Academy, serving grades K-8. They are contributing properties to the historic district.

The Willard and Josephine Hubbard House was individually listed on the National Register of Historic Places in 2016.

As of 2026, Herron-Morton Place is experiencing a significant surge in property values, largely driven by its proximity to the $4.3 billion IU Health downtown hospital expansion and the newly established Indy Health District. According to Realtor.com's Herron-Morton Market Summary, the median listing home price was $899,900 in late 2025, which reflected a 63% year-over-year increase from the previous year's listing trends, among the highest in the United States. Sources rank the Herron-Morton neighborhood as more expensive than 96.1% of neighborhoods in Indiana and 76.1% of neighborhoods in the U.S.

== Community ==
Since 1956, Herron–Morton Place has hosted the Talbot Street Art Fair, an annual juried art fair held on Talbott Street in June of each year, attracting over 60,000 visitors annually. The Herron–Morton Place Neighborhood Association was formed in 1976 to spearhead the renovation of homes, encourage new residential development, reduce crime, and rebuild community spirit.

The Herron–Morton Place Neighborhood Foundation raises funds to maintain a historic neighborhood park in the 1900 block of North Alabama Street, and other beautification efforts throughout the neighborhood. The foundation plans several events each year that raise money for the neighborhood park, the most notable of which are the annual Oktoberfest in late September, the bi-annual home tour (offering an opportunity to view the interior craftsmanship of the district's most significant private residences), and the year Rock 'N' Romp for families.

== Notable residents ==
- Samuel Ralston: governor of Indiana (1913–1917) and U.S. senator
- Albert J. Beveridge: U.S. senator and Pulitzer Prize-winning biographer
- John W. Kern: U.S. senator and Senate Majority Leader
- Frederic M. Ayres: president of L. S. Ayres & Co. department store
- William H. Bloch: founder of the William H. Block Co. department store
- William N. Wishard: physician and pioneer in urology
- T. C. Steele and William Forsyth: Impressionist painters of the "Hoosier Group"

== See also ==
- List of gay villages
- List of neighborhoods in Indianapolis
- National Register of Historic Places listings in Center Township, Marion County, Indiana
