= Bust of Richard Owen =

Public artwork by American artist Belle Kinney Scholz

Coordinates: 39.768651°N 86.162664°W

Colonel Richard Owen
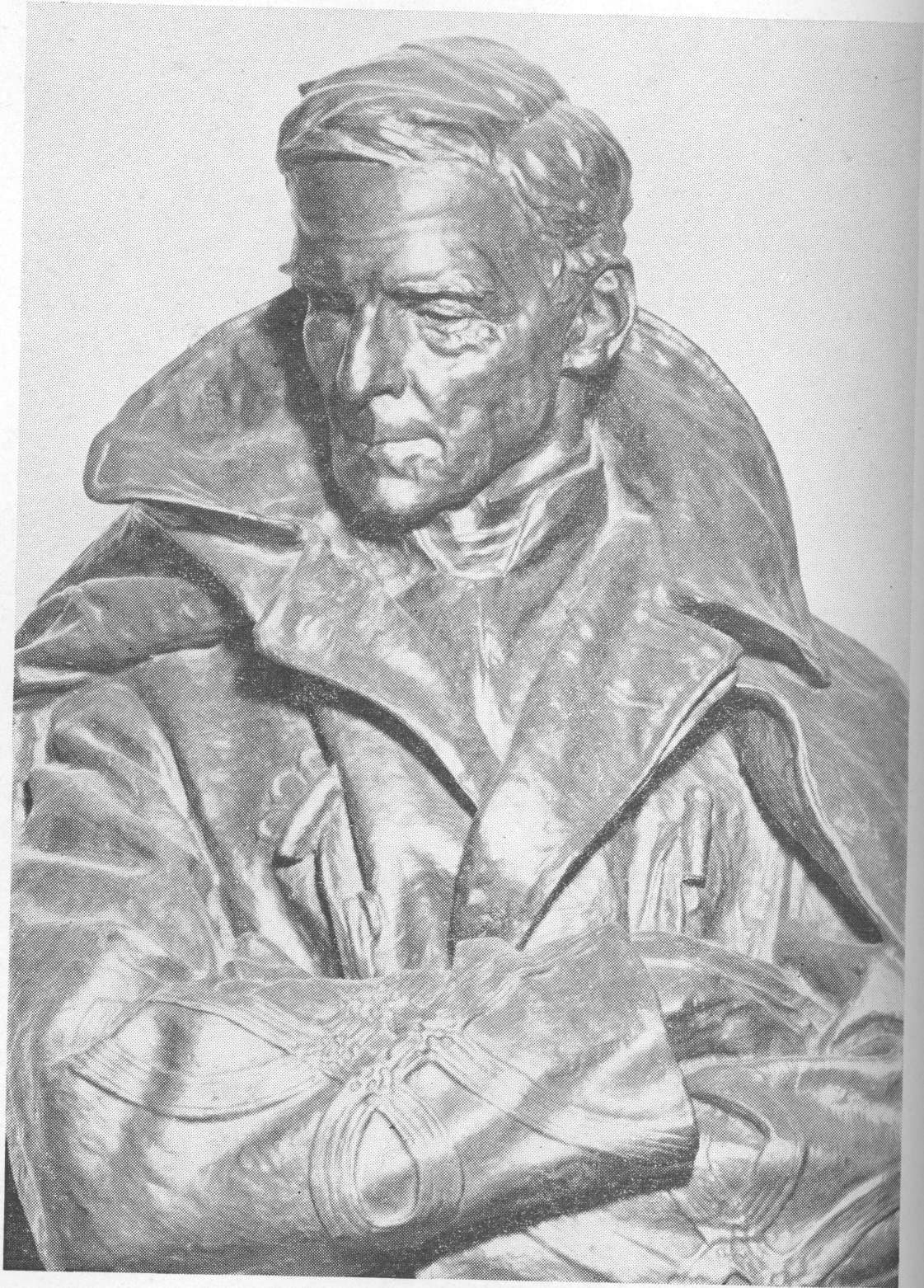
- Artist: Belle Kinney Scholz
- Year: 1913
- Type: Bronze on limestone base
- Dimensions: 180 cm × 100 cm (70 in × 40 in)
- Location: Indiana Statehouse, Indianapolis, IN
- Owner: State of Indiana

The Colonel Richard Owen bust is a public artwork by American artist Belle Kinney Scholz and is located in the Indiana Statehouse in Indianapolis, Indiana. The bronze bust was dedicated in 1913 as a memorial to U.S. Army Colonel Richard Owen. It was funded by contributions from individuals and Confederate veteran associations in recognition of Owen's courtesy to Confederate prisoners of war while he was commandant of Camp Morton, a prison camp in Indianapolis, during the American Civil War. The bust is approximately 70 inches (180 cm) tall (including base), 40 inches (100 cm), and 21 inches (53 cm).

== Description ==
The bronze bust rests on a three-part limestone base. The sculpture depicts Owen from the waist up wearing a Union military uniform with a cape-like overcoat. Owen's arms are folded across his chest and he gazes down to the proper right. The bottom, proper left side of the bust has an inscription that reads, "Belle Kinney/NY". The upper base has a wave motif carved into a border. The center base contains an inscription written with affixed bronze letters:

Colonel Richard Owen
Commandant
Camp Morton Prison 1862
Tribute by Confederate Prisoners
of War and Their Friends
for his Courtesy and Kindness.

Beneath the inscription, thirteen bronze stars (each approximately 3/4 inches wide) are arranged in a single horizontal line. On the top proper left side of the center base as inscription references the sculptor: "Belle Kinney, Sc". The bottom base is bordered by a row of leaves carved into the stone. In 2006 the Indiana State Museum listed the piece in excellent condition.

== Historical information ==
In February 1862, after the fall of Fort Donelson, Indiana Governor Oliver P. Morton agreed to hold Confederate prisoners of war at Camp Morton in Indianapolis. Morton summoned Owen's regiment, the 60th Indiana Volunteers, and others to Indiana to guard the camp's 3,700 prisoners. Owen assumed command of the camp on 24 February 1862 and remained in charge until his regiment was transferred to General Halleck's command in Kentucky on 26 May 1862. Owen left Indianapolis with his regiment on 20 June 1862. As commandant of Camp Morton, Owen established new rules for prisoner conduct and was known for his generosity and fair treatment of the camp's prisoners.

Fifty years later, in 1911, S. A. Cunningham, a longtime editor of the Confederate Veteran magazine wanted to commission a memorial to Owen. Cunningham was imprisoned at Camp Morton while it was under Owen's supervision. To obtain state government approval for a memorial, William W. Spencer, a member of the Indiana House of Representatives, put forth a resolution to authorized its creation:

Be it resolved by the House of Representatives, the Senate concurring therein, that the Governor of this State be authorized to permit the surviving Confederate prisoners who were confined in Camp Morton during the War between the States to erect a tablet to the memory of Col. Richard Owen for the kindness shown said Confederate prisoners, and that the Governor be authorized to designate the spot where said tablet shall be placed, either in the Statehouse, on the grounds of the Statehouse, or on the soldiers' monument in the city of Indianapolis.

The bill was approved unanimously by both houses. Initially, Cunningham planned to commission a memorial tablet and asked for donations in the Confederate Veteran from anyone who had been under Owen's command at the camp. Cunningham received more than $1,100 in contributions and had Belle Kinney Scholz, a sculptor and the daughter of a Confederate soldier, create a bronze bust instead of a tablet. The bust was dedicated at the Indiana Statehouse in June 1913, with Civil War veterans from both sides in attendance. The sculpture was called, "a bond between North and South."

Two replicas of the Owen bust were cast in 1933. One is installed in the Indiana Memorial Union at Indiana University in Bloomington; the other replica is in the Purdue Memorial Union at Purdue University, West Lafayette, Indiana.

== Artist ==
Regarding the Owen bust, Kinney Scholz said:

It was my aim to portray such a man as he might look while pondering over the meaning of the great struggle in which he was then taking part – his sympathetic heart touched by the suffering it caused, yet realizing its necessity...no work I have ever done gave me as much pleasure as the Owen bust.
