= United States Post Office (Angola, New York) =

- US Post Office--Angola
- U.S. National Register of Historic Places
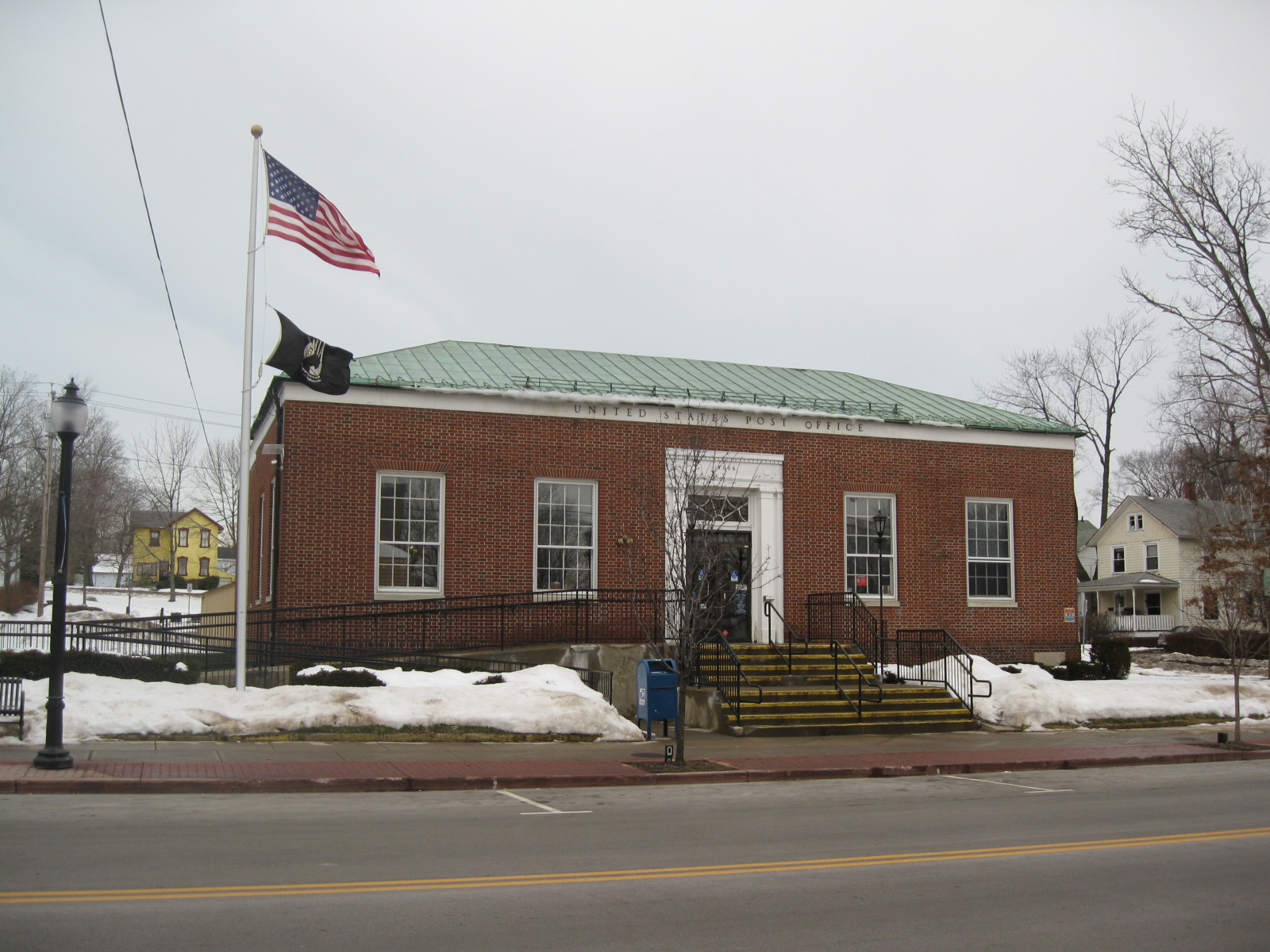
- U.S. Post Office, January 2010

- Location within New York Location within the United States
- Interactive map showing the location of the U.S. Post Office, Angola
- Location: 80 N. Main St., Angola, New York
- Coordinates: 42°38′23″N 79°1′42″W
- Built: 1938
- Architect: Simon, Louis A.; Scholz, Leopold
- Architectural style: Colonial Revival
- MPS: US Post Offices in New York State, 1858-1943, TR
- NRHP reference No.: 88002452
- Added to NRHP: November 17, 1988

US Post Office—Angola is a historic post office building located at Angola in Erie County, New York. It was designed and built 1938–1939, and is one of a number of post offices in New York State designed by the Office of the Supervising Architect of the Treasury Department, Louis A. Simon. The building is in the Colonial Revival style. The interior features a cast-stone relief sculpture by Leopold Scholz executed in 1940 and titled A Pioneer Woman's Bravery.

It was listed on the National Register of Historic Places in 1989.
