= Statue of Andrew Jackson (U.S. Capitol) =

Statue by Belle Kinney Scholz and Leopold Scholz

Andrew Jackson
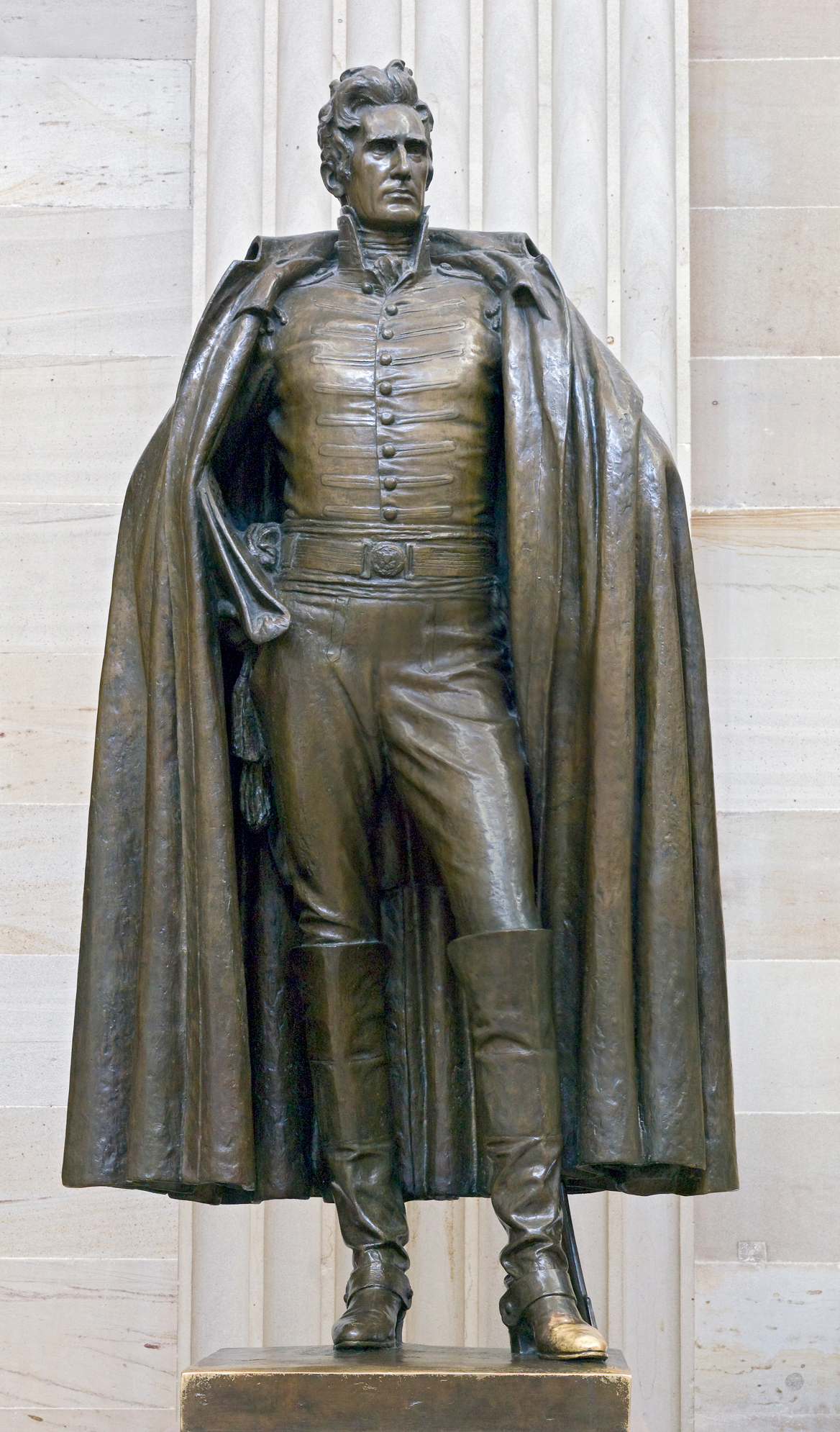
- Artist: Belle Kinney Scholz; Leopold Scholz
- Year: 1928
- Medium: Bronze sculpture
- Subject: Andrew Jackson
- Location: Washington, D.C., U.S.

Andrew Jackson is a 1928 bronze sculpture of Andrew Jackson by Belle Kinney Scholz and Leopold Scholz, installed in the United States Capitol, in Washington D.C., as part of the National Statuary Hall Collection. It is one of two statues donated by the state of Tennessee. The statue was accepted into the collection by Senator Kenneth McKellar on April 16, 1928.

== See also ==
- 1928 in art
- Equestrian statue of Andrew Jackson, Lafayette Square, Washington, D.C.
- List of sculptures of presidents of the United States
