= Leopold Scholz =

American sculptor

Leopold Scholz (1877–1946) Austrian born American sculptor best known for his works in the National Statuary Hall Collection housed in the US Capitol in Washington D.C.

In 1921 Scholz married sculptor Belle Kinney Scholz and much of his best known work was executed with her.

IN 1938 Scholz created a statue for the United States post office in Chattanooga, Tennessee. The statue, a bust from the waist up, portrays a postman dressing in the 1930s uniform, with a look of determination on his face that reminds us that the mail will be delivered no matter what the obstacles might be.

== Work ==
The Mail Carrier (1938), Scholz's cast aluminum bust for the Joel W. Solomon Federal Building and United States Courthouse in Chattanooga, Tennessee, was commissioned by the Section of Painting and Sculpture.

- Andrew Jackson statue, National Statuary Hall Collection, U.S. Capitol, Washington D.C., with Belle Kinney 1927
- John Sevier statue, National Statuary Hall Collection, U.S. Capitol, with Belle Kinney, 1931
- Bronx Victory statue, Bronx Victory Column & Memorial Grove World War I Memorial in Pelham Bay Park, New York City, with Belle Kinney, 1933
- Victory statue, War Memorial Auditorium, Legislative Plaza, Nashville, with Belle Kinney, 1929
- Pediment sculptures of the Nashville Parthenon, with Belle Kinney, 1920-30
- Postman, Chattanooga Post Office, Chattanooga, Tennessee, 1938
- A Pioneer Woman's Bravery, a cast stone bas relief, WPA project for the USPO, Angola, New York, 1940
