= Statue of John Sevier =

Statue in the U.S. Capitol

John Sevier
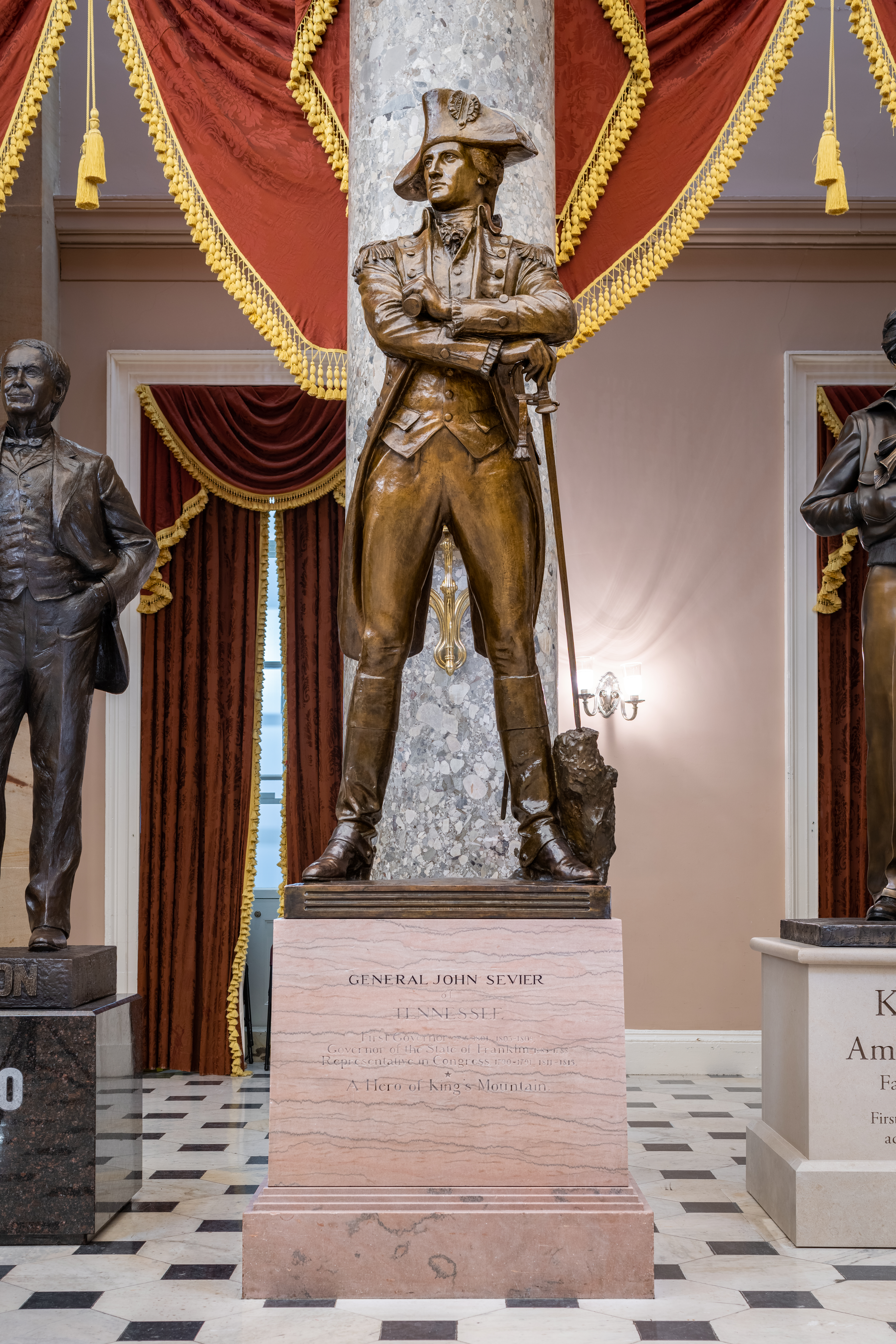
- The statue at the National Statuary Hall in 2023
- Artist: Belle Kinney; Leopold Scholz
- Medium: Bronze sculpture
- Subject: John Sevier
- Location: Washington, D.C., United States

John Sevier is a bronze sculpture depicting the American politician of the same name by Belle Kinney and Leopold Scholz, installed in the United States Capitol's National Statuary Hall, in Washington, D.C., as part of the National Statuary Hall Collection. The statue was gifted by the U.S. state of Tennessee in 1931.
