= Battle of Pogue's Run =

Battle of the American Civil War

- Part of the American Civil War
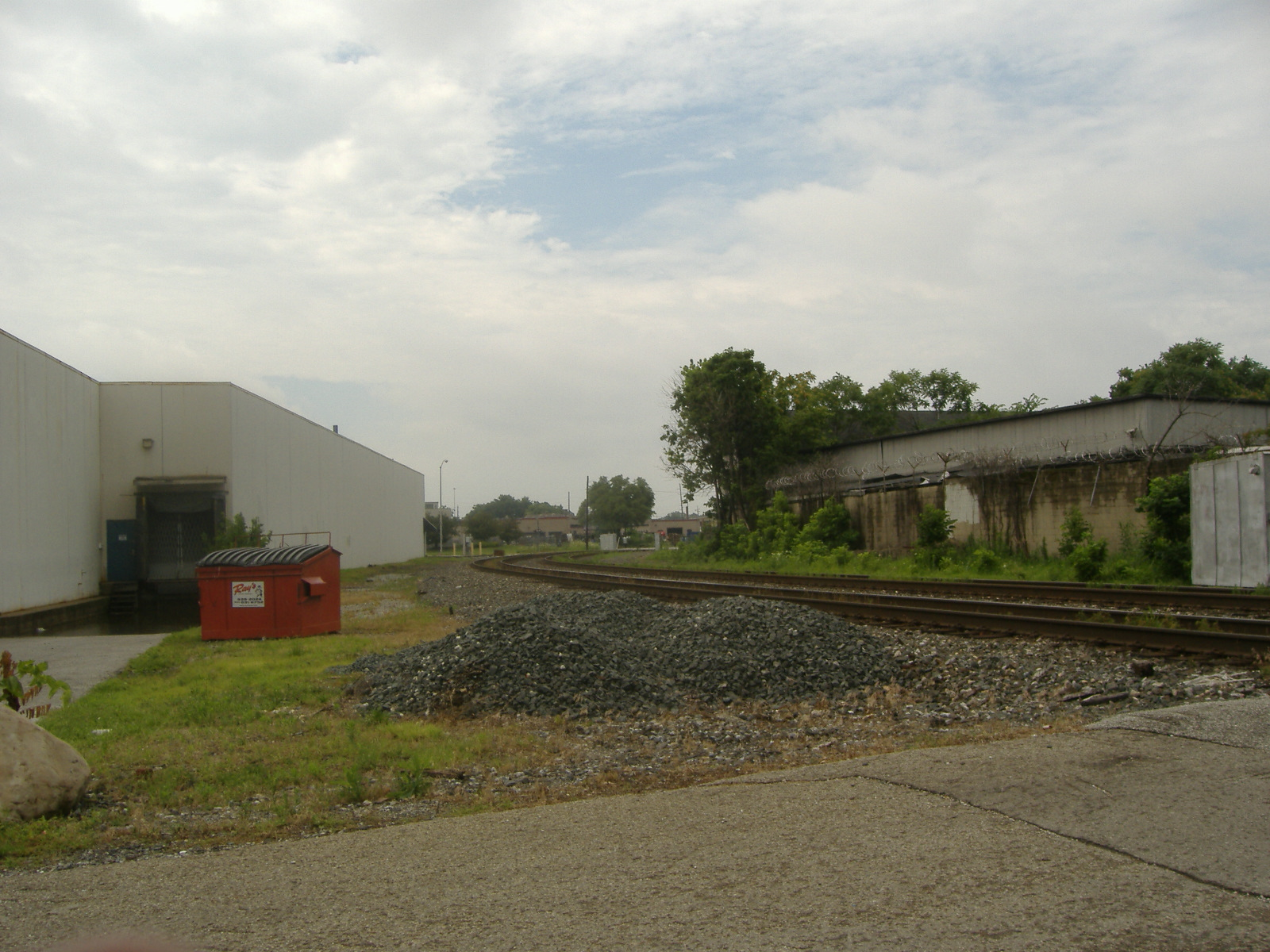
- Site of the so-called "battle" in modern-day Indianapolis.
Date	May 20, 1863
Location	Indianapolis, Indiana, U.S. 39°46′16.75″N 86°8′25.04″W

The "Battle" of Pogue's Run took place in Indianapolis, Indiana, on May 20, 1863, during the American Civil War. It was believed that many of the delegates to the Indiana Democrats state convention were carrying firearms in the hope of inciting a rebellion. Union soldiers entered the hall in which the convention took place and found personal weapons on many of the delegates. Afterwards, Union soldiers stopped trains carrying delegates to their home areas, causing many of the delegates to throw weapons into Pogue's Run, thereby giving the event its name.

== Origin ==
Indiana governor Oliver Morton, a Republican, heard that the Knights of the Golden Circle were planning to overthrow the Indiana government during the Democratic State Convention. He had placed Union troops at the convention specifically to intimidate the delegates to the convention.

== Convention ==
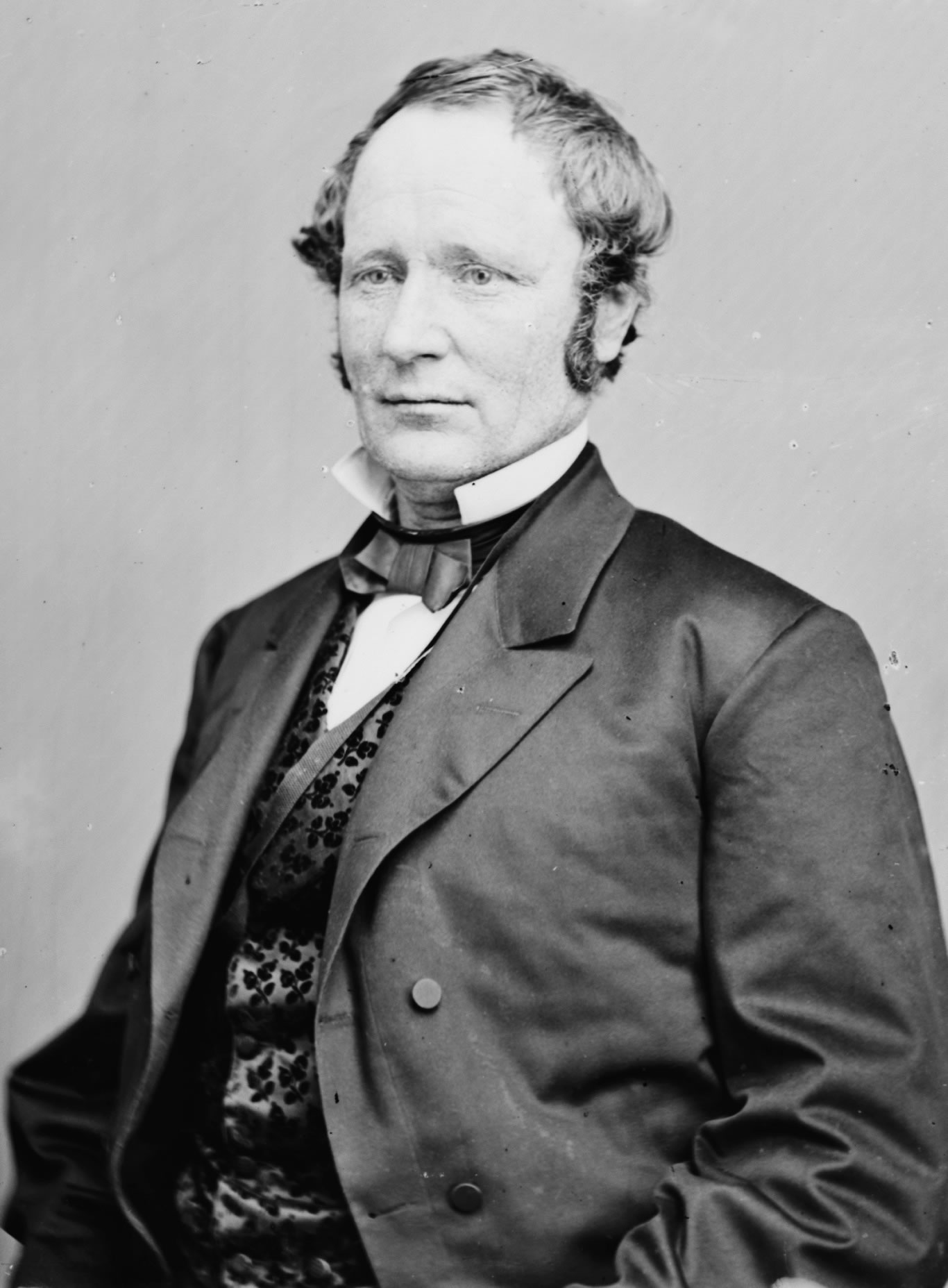
Thomas A. Hendricks

About four o'clock in the afternoon, while Thomas A. Hendricks was addressing the 10,000 participants at the Democrat state convention, some eight or ten Union soldiers with bayonets fixed and rifles cocked entered the crowd and advanced slowly toward the stand, causing a great uproar. The crowd scattered in every direction. A high fence on the east side of the Statehouse square was pushed down by the rushing crowd. A squad of cavalry galloped along Tennessee Street (now named Capitol Avenue), adding to the tumult. The soldiers, who were moving towards the stand, were ordered to halt by Colonel Coburn, who had been guarding the quartermaster's stores north of the Statehouse but came out when he heard the disturbance. He asked what they were doing. They said they were "going for Tom Hendricks" because Hendricks had said too much, and they intended to kill him. Coburn expostulated with them, and they desisted. There was much confusion on the speaker's stand. Hendricks closed his remarks prematurely, suggesting that the resolutions be read and the meeting dismissed. The resolutions declared that the Federal government had two wars upon its hands, one against the rebels and one against the constitution. The Republicans in the most recent General Assembly, who had broken the quorum, were denounced, and the convention declared that the Governor could not clear himself from complicity, except by taking steps to prevent repudiation.

Toward the close of the day, some young soldiers walked through the crowd, and, when they heard anyone speak against the war, seized the individual and marched him up the street with a great rabble following. In many cases, after they had marched some the person a few blocks and thoroughly frightened him, they either slipped away or told him that if he would behave himself, they would let him go. A number of men were taken to the police court and charged with carrying concealed weapons, and about forty pistols were taken from those arrested.

== Train stops ==
Later on, the night of May 20, many of the Democratic delegates took trains departing from Indianapolis. When the meeting was over and the trains were leaving the city, a great number of shots were fired from the cars on the trains going to Lafayette, Indiana, and Terre Haute, Indiana. The intention to create an armed disturbance, although unaccomplished, now seemed clear, and the soldiers determined to teach the remaining "butternuts" a lesson. When the Indiana Central Railroad train left the station, a gun was placed in front of it on the track. The train stopped. A small body of soldiers were collected under General Hascall, and a policeman, accompanied by a few of these soldiers, demanded the surrender of all firearms by the passengers. Nearly two hundred weapons were given up.

The train to Cincinnati, Ohio, was also stopped and many revolvers were confiscated while a large number were thrown by their owners into Pogue's Run at the side of the track. Pistols had also been given to many of the women in the mistaken belief that they would not be searched. Seven were found upon a single woman. A knife nearly two feet (0.6 m) long was also discovered in the stove in one of the cars. In all, about 500 loaded revolvers were taken from those who had attended the meeting.

== Aftermath ==
The Indianapolis Sentinel described the event as: "It is with feelings of sorrow, humiliation and degradation that we witnessed the scenes of yesterday. . .. Indiana is as completely under military rule as France, Austria or Russia". But to those who supported Morton's action, it seemed to them that would-be insurrectionists would be too cowardly to actually rebel.

The term "Battle of Pogue's Run" was derisively given to the event by the Republican Party, who praised the soldiers involved as "halt(ing) a meeting of traitors to the Union cause". The Democrats, on the other hand, called the event "still more assaults upon constitutional rights" by those supporting Abraham Lincoln and Governor Morton.

== See also ==
- Indianapolis in the American Civil War
