= Belle Kinney Scholz =

American sculptor

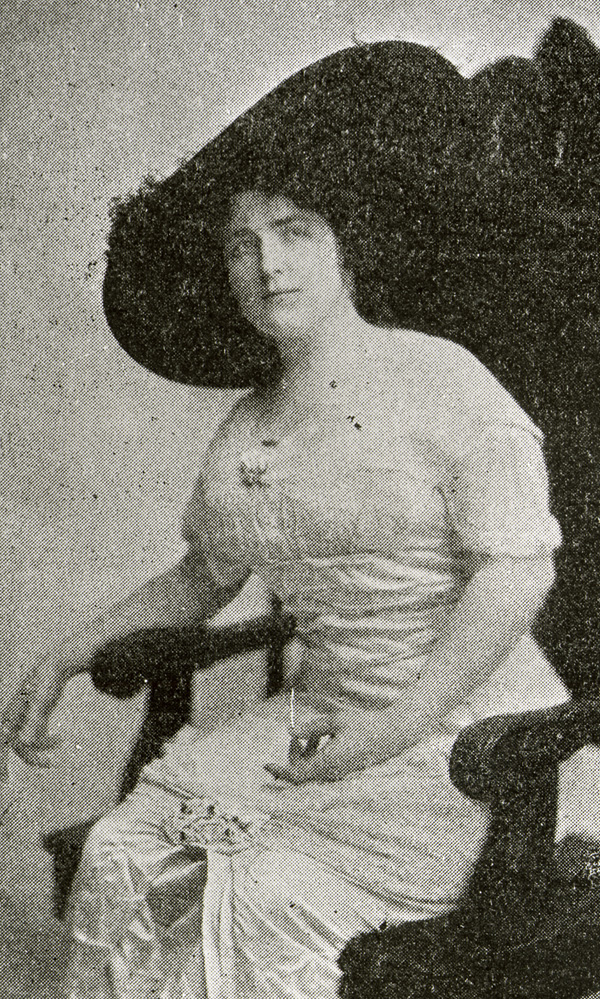
- Born: Belle Marshall Kinney; 1890; Nashville, Tennessee
- Died: 1959 (aged 68–69)
- Education: Art Institute of Chicago
- Known for: sculpture
- Spouse: Leopold Scholz

Belle Marshall Kinney Scholz (1890–1959) was an American sculptor, born in Tennessee who worked and died in New York state.

== Early life ==
Belle Kinney was one of four children born to Captain D.C. Kenny and Elizabeth Morrison Kenny. She was born in Nashville, Tennessee. During the 1897 Tennessee Centennial Exposition, she won a special award for modelling in clay for a bust of her father displayed in the Children's Building.

== Sculpting career ==
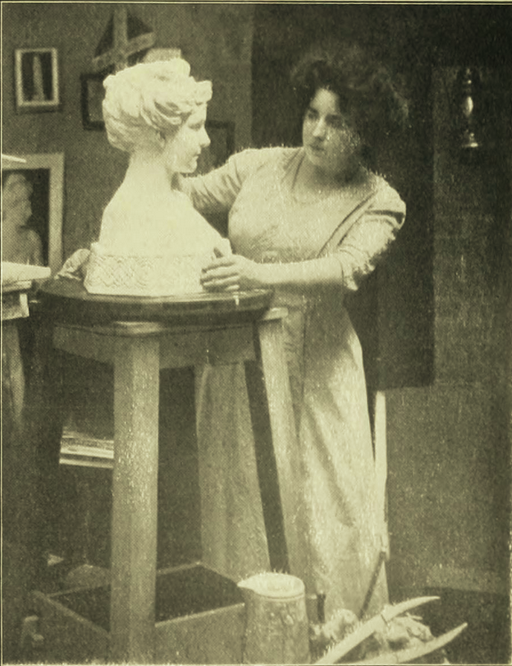
Belle Kinney (ca. 1911)

At age 15, Belle Kinney was awarded a scholarship to the Art Institute of Chicago, where she studied with Lorado Taft. In 1907, at age 17, she received her first commission, to sculpt the statue of Jere Baxter, organizer of the Tennessee Central Railway. Following her work at the Art Institute, Kinney maintained a studio in Greenwich Village, during which time she met Austrian-born sculptor Leopold F. Scholz (1877–1946). They married in 1921, and completed several other works together, including the Victory statue in the War Memorial Building court at Legislative Plaza, Nashville (1929) and the bronze figure of Victory for the World War I Memorial in Pelham Bay Park, Bronx, New York City (1933). They also created both works representing Tennessee in the National Statuary Hall Collection in the US Capitol in Washington D.C.

By 1948, Kinney was maintaining a studio in Chattanooga, Tennessee. Kinney died on August 27 or 28, 1959 at age 69 in Boiceville, Ulster County, New York.

== Work ==
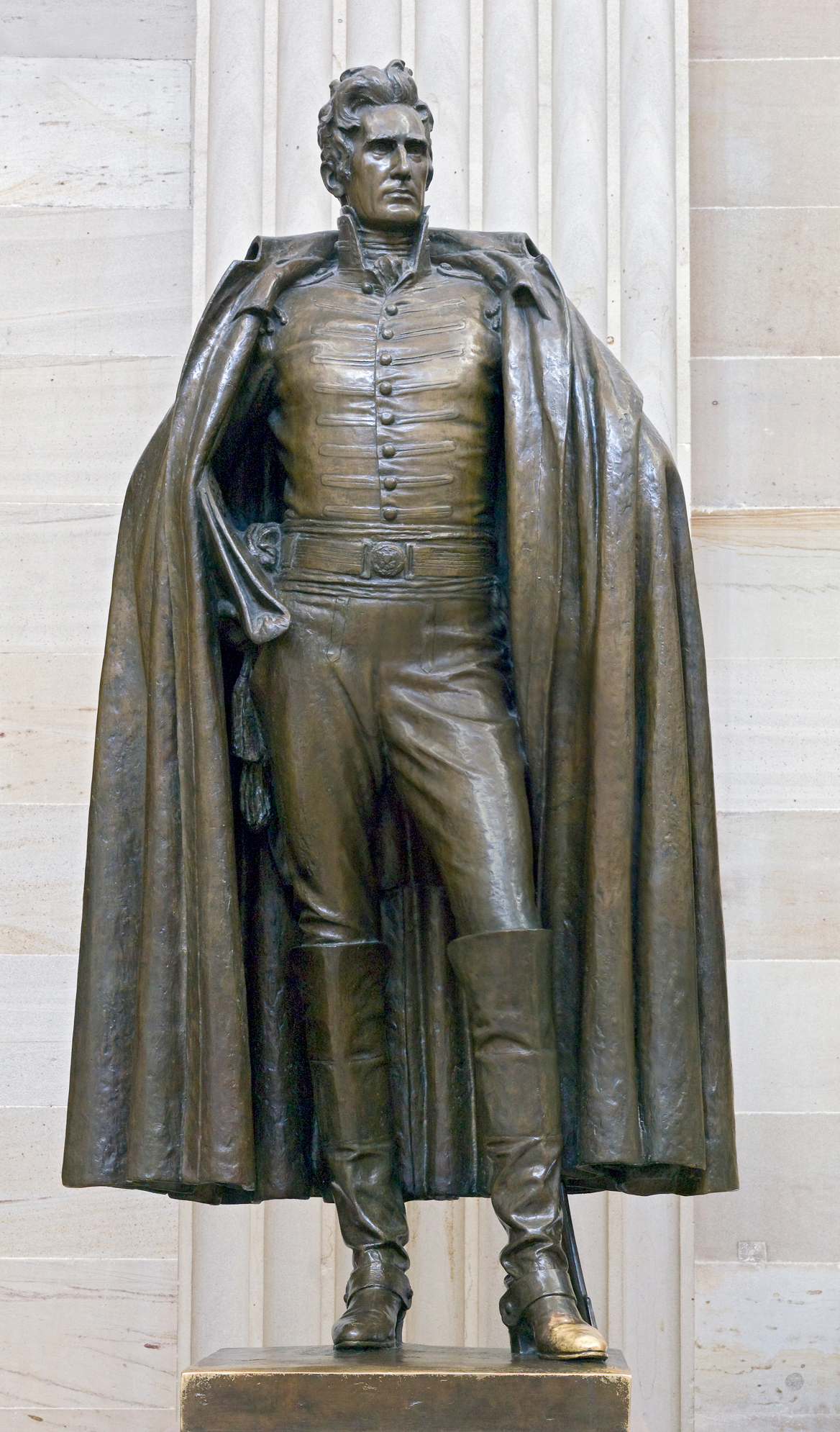
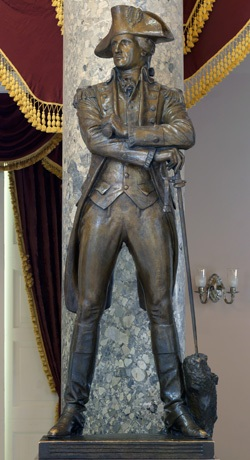
Andrew Jackson (1927) and John Sevier (1931) at the U.S. Capitol, executed with Leopold Scholz
- Bust of Richard Owen, Indianapolis 1913 (replica at Indiana University, Bloomington, Indiana)
- Women of the Confederacy, Jackson, Mississippi (1917)
- Tennessee Monument to the Women of the Confederacy, Nashville, Tennessee (1926)
- Jere Baxter statue, Jere Baxter School, Nashville (1907)
- Andrew Jackson statue, National Statuary Hall Collection, U.S. Capitol, Washington D.C. (1927)
- John Sevier statue, National Statuary Hall Collection, U.S. Capitol (1931)
- General Joseph E. Johnston statue, Dalton, Georgia (1912)
- Admiral Albert Gleaves bust, Annapolis, Maryland (1938)
- Andrew Jackson bust, Tennessee State Capitol, Nashville
- James K. Polk bust, Tennessee State Capitol, Nashville
- John Ross bust, Hamilton County Courthouse, Chattanooga, Tennessee (1958)
- Alexander P. Stewart bust, Hamilton County Courthouse, Chattanooga, Tennessee (1911)
- Victory statue, Bronx County World War I Memorial in Pelham Bay Park, New York City, with Leopold Scholz (1933)
- Victory statue, War Memorial Auditorium, Legislative Plaza, Nashville, with Leopold Scholz (1929)
- Pediment sculptures of the Nashville Parthenon, with Leopold Scholz (1920–30)
- Bronze bust of David Crockett, Trenton, Tennessee (1950)
