= List of neighborhoods in Indianapolis =

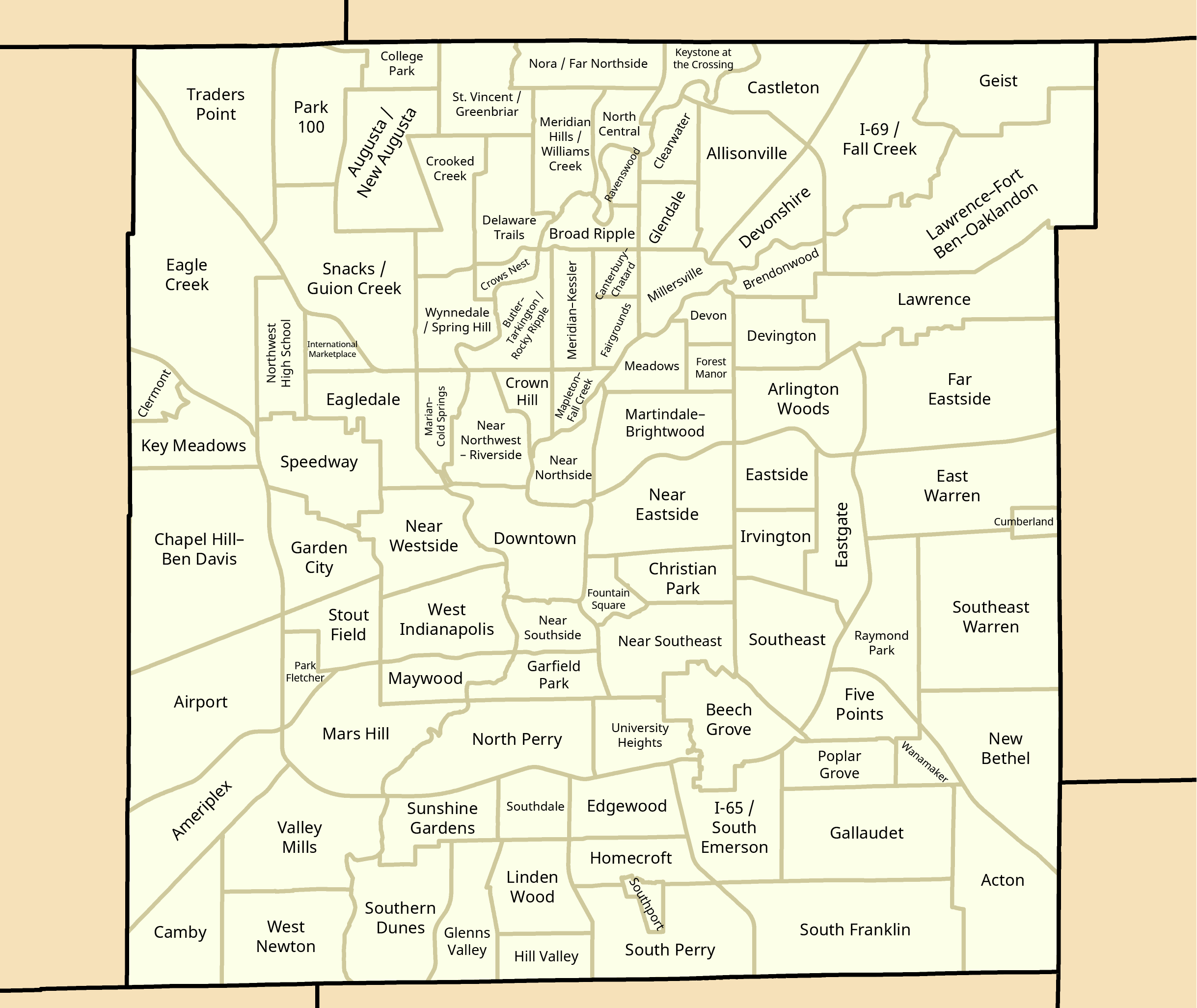
A map of Indianapolis–Marion County neighborhood areas labeled

This list of Indianapolis neighborhoods provides a general overview of neighborhoods, districts, and subdivisions located in the city of Indianapolis, Indiana, United States. Nine townships form the broadest geographic divisions within Marion County and Indianapolis. For statistical purposes, the consolidated city-county is organized into 99 smaller "neighborhood areas", some of which overlap township boundaries. Most neighborhood areas contain numerous individual districts, subdivisions, and some semi-autonomous towns. In total, some 500 self-identified neighborhood associations are registered in the City's Registered Community Organization system.

Typical of American cities in the Midwest, Indianapolis urbanized in the late-19th and early-20th centuries, resulting in the development of relatively dense, well-defined neighborhoods clustered around streetcar corridors, especially in Center Township. The economic attainability of private automobiles influenced the city's development patterns through the mid-20th century. In 1970, the governments of Indianapolis and Marion County consolidated, expanding the city from 82 square miles (210 km^{2}) to more than 360 square miles (930 km^{2}) overnight. As a result, Indianapolis has a unique urban-to-rural transect, ranging from dense urban neighborhoods, to suburban tract housing subdivisions, to rural villages.

== History ==
=== Annexations ===
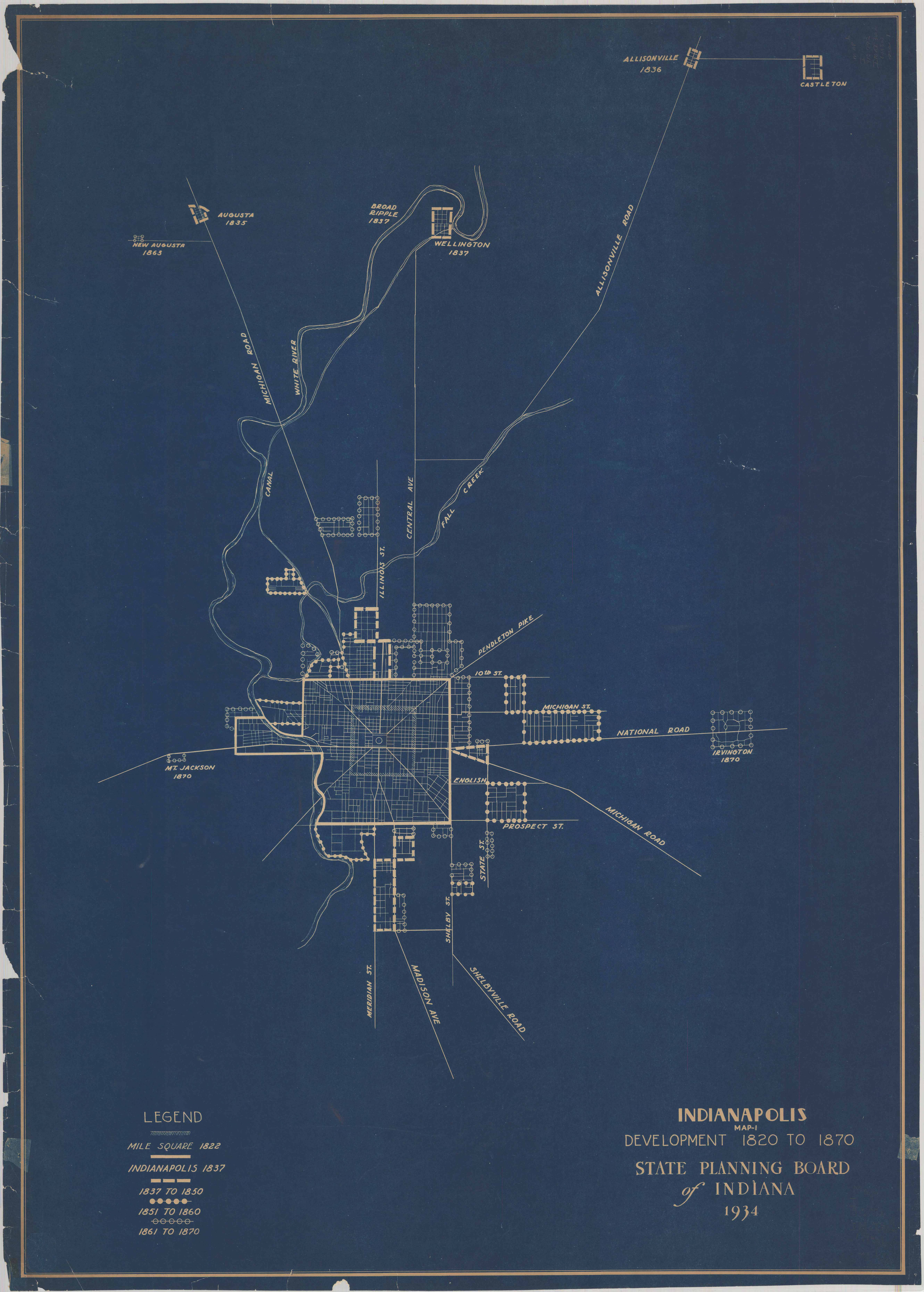
1820 to 1870

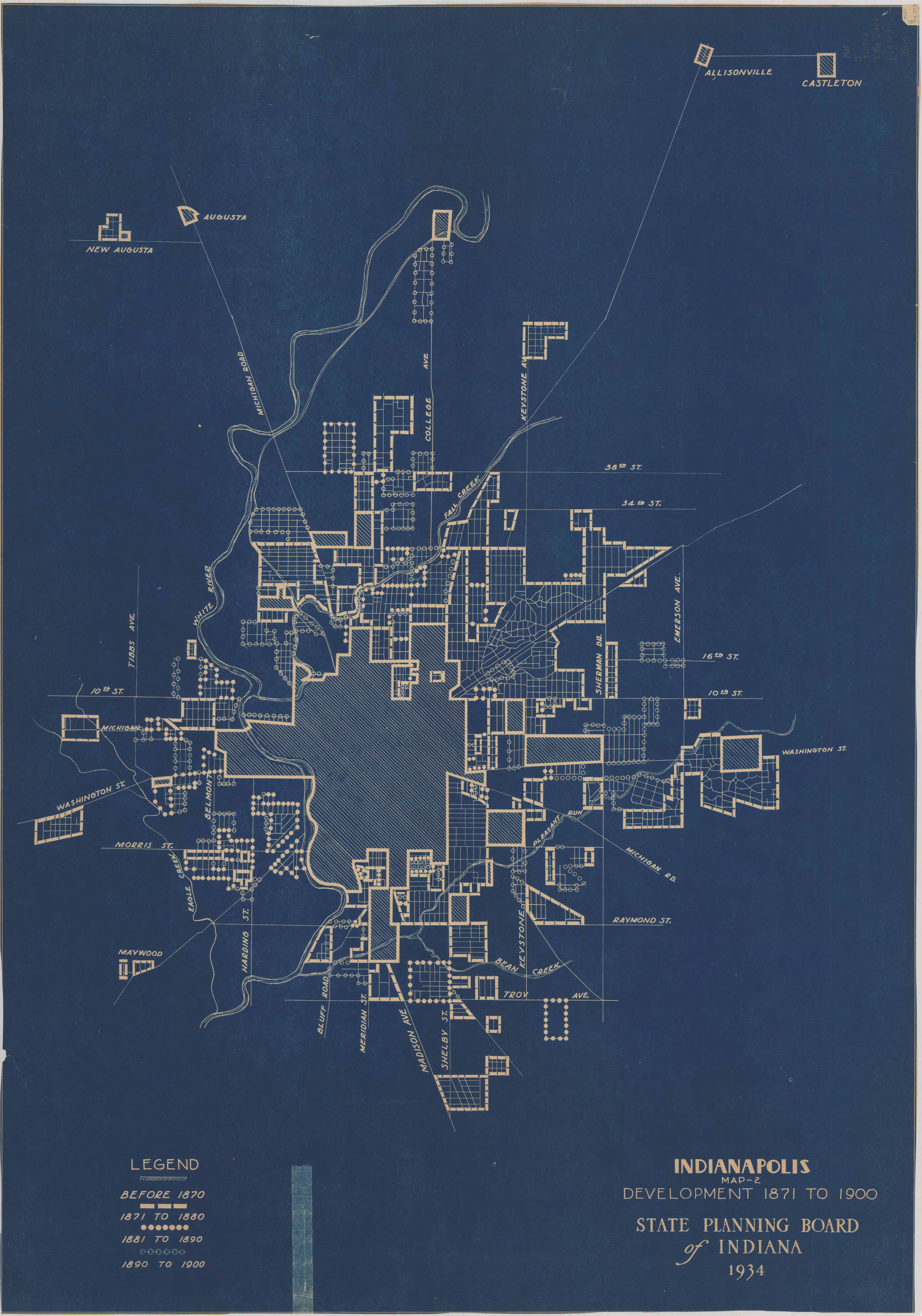
1871 to 1900

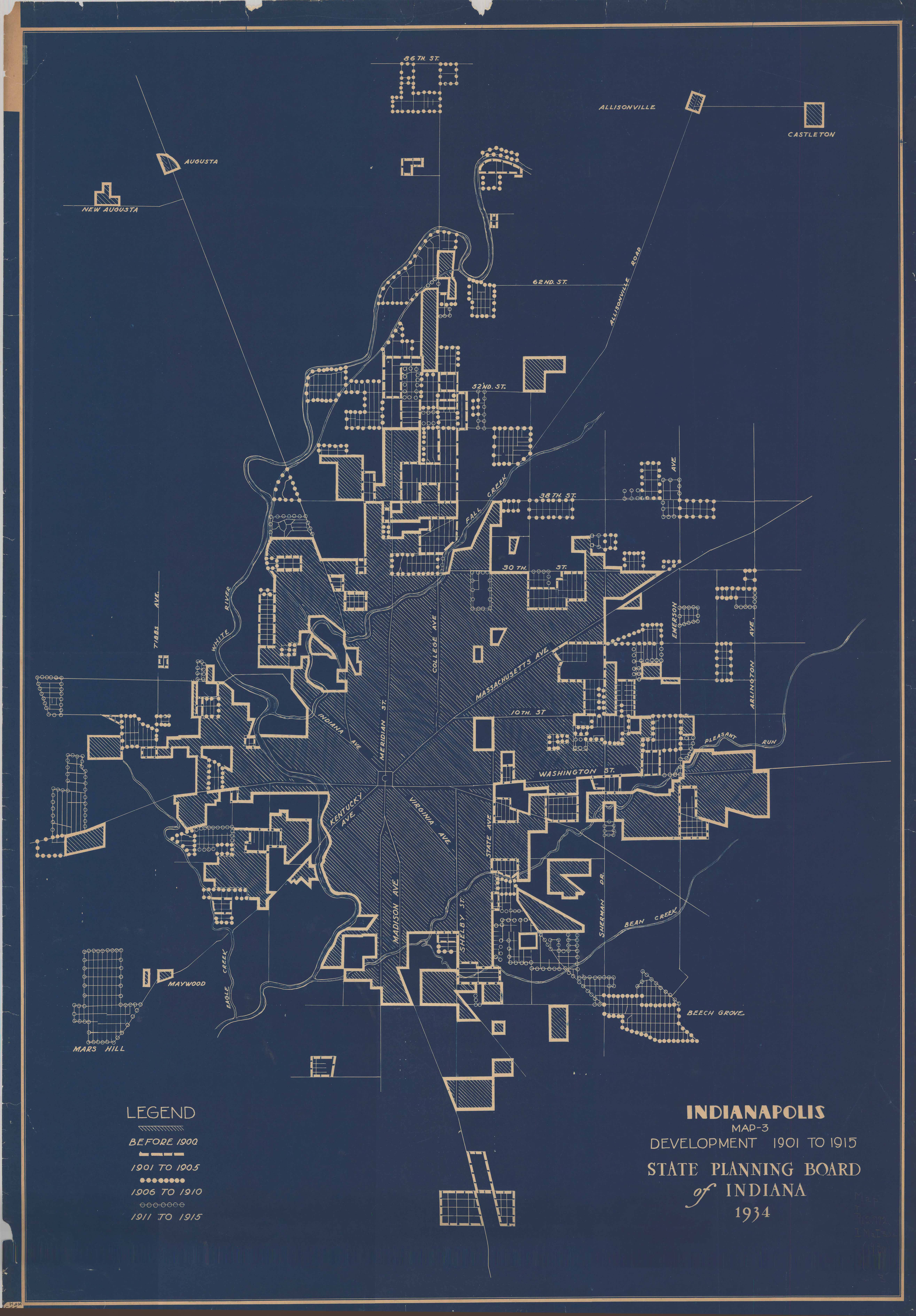
1901 to 1915

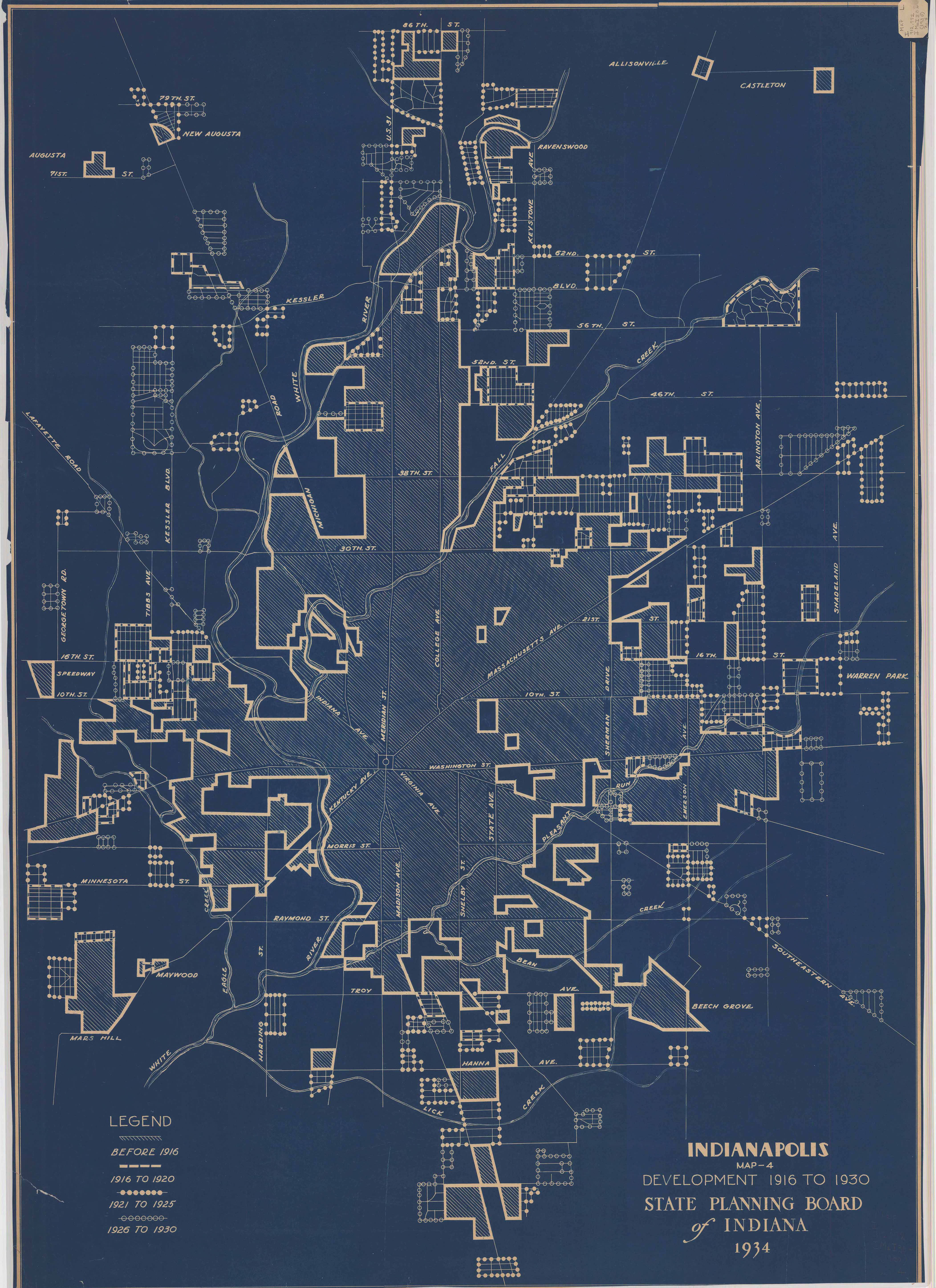
1916 to 1930

Series of maps from the State Planning Board of Indiana depicting Indianapolis development from 1820 to 1930

Since its founding in 1821, Indianapolis' outward development was measured, with few annexations. By 1891, revisions to the city charter incorporated provisions that strengthened the city's annexation powers. The controversial provision was mired in litigation until 1895 when the Indiana General Assembly effectively endorsed the city's position by state statute. In 1897, Indianapolis responded with the annexation of five suburbs: Brightwood, Haughville, Mount Jackson, North Indianapolis, and West Indianapolis. Between 1890 and 1900, the city's land area had more than doubled from 12.4 square miles (32 km^{2}) to 27.21 square miles (70.5 km^{2}).

The expansion of the city's streetcar and interurban systems at the turn of the 20th century allowed workers to live further from the economic center of Indianapolis, establishing streetcar suburbs on the city's periphery. These included towns as far east as Irvington (annexed in 1902) and as far south as University Heights (annexed in 1923). The town of Broad Ripple, which had itself absorbed neighboring Wellington in 1884, was annexed into the city of Indianapolis in 1922. By the end of the 1950s, the city had appointed an annexation director and completed several major annexations adding 28,000 residents. Woodruff Place was annexed in 1962.

=== Unigov ===
On January 1, 1970, the city-county consolidation of Indianapolis and Marion County (Unigov) resulted in the partial annexation of 16 towns, known as "included towns". Under state statute, included towns retain some limited autonomy; however, they are legally considered part of the Consolidated City of Indianapolis and Marion County, subject to its laws and government. As of 2021, eleven towns retain their status as "included towns", (Note: "Included towns" include the towns of Clermont, Crows Nest, Cumberland (partial), Homecroft, Meridian Hills, North Crows Nest, Rocky Ripple, Spring Hill, Warren Park, Williams Creek, and Wynnedale. For more information, see Unigov#Included towns.) while five have fully dissolved: Highwoods, Lynhurst (1988), Ravenswood (1989), Shore Acres (1991), and Castleton (1992). Of the dissolved towns, Castleton and Ravenswood have retained some local identity, as evidenced by the continued use of those names for two of Indianapolis' official neighborhood areas.

By default, several unincorporated communities in outlying townships were absorbed into Indianapolis as a result of Unigov. Most had been established in the 19th century as rural outposts or early railroad stations. These included Valley Mills and West Newton in Decatur Township; Acton, Five Points, and Wanamaker in Franklin Township; Edgewood in Perry Township; Augusta in Pike Township; Julietta in Warren Township; Allisonville in Washington Township; and Ben Davis, Bridgeport, and Maywood in Wayne Township. Many of these unincorporated places have retained the appearance of rural villages well into the 21st century and continue to be referenced by their bygone names, as evidenced by several designated neighborhood areas that have appropriated names based on relative geography.

== List ==
| City-designated "neighborhood areas" | Subdivisions and districts covered | Population (2020) (Note: Population figures for individual neighborhood areas can be accessed in two ways via IndyVitals.org: first, by hovering over the interactive map and selecting the neighborhood area, or by selecting the neighborhood area from the dropdown menu on the left side of the webpage.) | Population rank | Locator map |
|---|---|---|---|---|
| Acton | Bloomfield Lakes Estates · Harmony | 3,714 | 78th | |
| Airport | | 123 | 98th | |
| Allisonville | Arrowhead Estates · Beaumont on the Green · Eastwood · High Gate · Ivy Hills · Roland Park · Steinmeier Estates · Steinmeier Village · Sycamore Springs · Tanglewood | 10,207 | 38th | |
| Ameriplex | Stone Ridge · Valley Brook | 4,037 | 75th | |
| Arlington Woods | Audubon Gardens | 8,291 | 45th | |
| Augusta / New Augusta | Augusta Green · Branch Creek at Pike · Brentwood Springs · Bretton Wood · Cooper Pointe · Crooked Creek Villages · Faith Knoll · Lloyd Meadows · New Augusta Woods · Northpointe Village | 18,813 | 14th | |
| Beech Grove (Note: "Excluded cities" include the cities of Beech Grove, Lawrence, Southport, and the town of Speedway. For more information, see Unigov#Excluded cities and town.) | Carrington · Carrington Woods · Park Meadow · South Grove Woods | 14,646 | 23rd | |
| Brendonwood | Brendon Park · Brendonridge · Brendonshire · Windridge | 3,264 | 83rd | |
| Broad Ripple (Note: Designated cultural districts include Broad Ripple Village, Canal and White River State Park, Fountain Square, Indiana Avenue, Market East, Mass Ave, and the Wholesale District. For more information, see Indianapolis Cultural Districts.) | Dawnbury–Keystone (Note: Dawnbury–Keystone straddles two neighborhood areas—Broad Ripple and Ravenswood.) · Warfleigh | 7,461 | 50th | |
| Butler–Tarkington / Rocky Ripple | | 10,899 | 35th | |
| Camby | Groves at Camby Village · Harvard Green at Camby Village · Heartland Crossing | 7,308 | 51st | |
| Canterbury–Chatard | | 4,145 | 74th | |
| Castleton | Autumn Woods · Avery Pointe · Bayside Woods · Berkley Place · Castlebridge · Castle Creek · Castle Knoll Farms · Castlewood Estates · Charter Pointe · Hearth Stone · Lakeshore · The Masters · The Preserve on Allisonville · Riverbend · Scandia · Spinnaker Cove · Steeplechase · Woodbridge of Castleton · Woodbrook · Woods Edge | 11,198 | 33rd | |
| Chapel Hill–Ben Davis | Arbor Woods · Avon Creek Estates · Berkshire Lakes · Berkshire Woods · Bridgeport · Bridgeport Commons · Cameron Meadows · Chapel Bend · Chapel Glen · Country Meadows · Countryside · Farley · Heatherwood Estates · Lake of the Pines · Mariwood · New Heritage · Parc Estates · Parc Estates North · Salem Creek Meadows · Sungate · Sunset Lake · West Glen Village · West Wayne Woods · Westwood | 34,670 | 2nd | |
| Christian Park | Twin Aire | 9,179 | 42nd | |
| Clearwater | Harbour Club · Somerset Bay · Sylvan Ridge · Sylvan Ridge Lakes | 3,413 | 81st | |
| Clermont | | 2,330 | 87th | |
| College Park | College Park Estates · Waterbury | 3,559 | 79th | |
| Crooked Creek | Harcourt Springs | 13,226 | 25th | |
| Crown Hill | Highland Vicinity | 4,506 | 72nd | |
| Crows Nest | North Crows Nest | 339 | 97th | |
| Cumberland | | 2,453 | 86th | |
| Delaware Trails | Brackenwood · Countrybrook North · Delaware Trails North · Delaware Trails South · Foxhill Acres Estates · Fox Hill Estates · Lions Head | 7,514 | 49th | |
| Devington | Devon Hills | 11,925 | 30th | |
| Devon | Devon Hills · Devon Ridge · Devon Woods (Note: Devon Woods straddles two neighborhood areas—Devon and Meadows.) · Ladywood Estates | 1,951 | 91st | |
| Devonshire | Avalon Estates · Avalon Hills · Kessler Commons · Lake Kesslerwood · Spruce Knoll · Wynterway Estates | 6,256 | 60th | |
| Downtown | 16 Tech Innovation District · Babe Denny · Canal and White River State Park · Chatham–Arch · Cole–Noble · Fayette Street · Flanner House Homes · Fletcher Place · Indiana Avenue · Lockefield Gardens · Lockerbie Square · Market East · Mass Ave · Ransom Place · Renaissance Place · St. Joseph · Wholesale District | 22,412 | 10th | |
| Eagle Creek | Aspen Ridge · Bayhead Village · Bay Landing · Bay Point · Center Point · Chesapeake Landing · Cobble Stone · Coppermill at the Park · Deer Cross · Eagle Bay · Eagle Chase · Eagle Creek Woods · Eagle Pointe · Eagles Crossing · Eagles Landing · Eagles Watch · Eagles Way · Fox Orchard · Heather Ridge · Hickory Square · Idlewood · Malibu Mills · Oaks of Eagle Creek · The Park at Eagle Creek · The Preserve at Eagle Creek · Reflections · Spinnaker · Summerfield · Timberview at Eagle Creek · The Trees · Trophy Club · Twin Oaks · Waterwood at Eagle Creek · Westbay · Wind Drift | 17,355 | 16th | |
| Eagledale | Highwoods · Rolling Meadows · Venerable Flackville · Westview | 23,365 | 8th | |
| Eastgate | English Crossing · Shiloh Estates · Sycamore Heights · Warren Park (Note: Warren Park straddles three neighborhood areas—Eastgate, Eastside, and Irvington.) | 6,235 | 61st | |
| East Warren | Autumn Glen · Bradford Trace · Braeburn Village · BrookWood · Hartman Village · Heather Hills · Maple Creek · Park Valley Estates · RossWood · Tealpoint · Valley Creek · Warren Lakes · Washington Place · Wellington Park | 23,854 | 7th | |
| Eastside | Community Heights · Warren Park · Windsor Village | 11,496 | 32nd | |
| Edgewood | Drakeshire · Longacre · Mary Knoll | 9,553 | 39th | |
| Fairgrounds | Bellaire · Keystone–Monon · Montrose | 4,615 | 71st | |
| Far Eastside | Briarbrook Village · Franklin Heights · Homewood Park · Northeastwood · Pine Crest · West Eastwood | 40,647 | 1st | |
| Five Points | Adler Grove · Hanover · Wildwood Farms at Becker Estates · Wildwood Farms at Moeller Estates | 6,610 | 57th | |
| Forest Manor | | 3,497 | 80th | |
| Fountain Square | Irish Hill · North Square · Prospect Falls | 5,989 | 63rd | |
| Gallaudet | Amber Ridge · Ashland Pointe · Buck Creek Woods · Burton Crossing · Carriage Courts · Edgewood Trace · Glen Ridge · The Pointe Dimond Ridge · The Point Emerald Ridge · Southport Green · Spring Oaks · Stone Pointe · Thompson Park · Village of New Bethel · Waters Edge · Wildcat Park · Wildcat Run · Woodland Trace | 13,031 | 26th | |
| Garden City | Lynhurst Gardens · Mickleyville · Speedway Woods | 16,595 | 17th | |
| Garfield Park | Germania Creek · South Village | 5,213 | 69th | |
| Geist | Admirals Bay · Admirals Pointe · Admirals Sound · Beam Reach · Feather Bay · Feather Cove I, II, III · The Hamptons at Geist · Harbour Pines · Harbour Pines North · Lighthouse Cove · Masthead of Geist Harbours · The Moorings · The Preserve at Fall Creek · ShoreWalk · Vineyards of Fall Creek · Windsong | 9,083 | 43rd | |
| Glendale | Chatham Pointe · Terra Vista · Westmore Heights | 3,979 | 76th | |
| Glenns Valley | Arbors on Bluff · Aspen Lakes · Dakota Ridge · Emerald Highlands at Killarney Hill · Hunter's Run · Killarney Hill at Murphy's Landing · Maple Grove · Monteo Village · Murphy's Landing · Perry Commons · Ridge Hills Trails · Shannon Lakes at Murphy's Landing · Sonesta · Southwinds at Murphy's Landing · Southwinds Circle · Southwinds Villas · Valley Ridge Farms · Valley View Farms | 9,540 | 40th | |
| Hill Valley | Buffalo Creek · Classic View · Hill Valley Estates · The Magnolia | 7,205 | 52nd | |
| Homecroft | Perry Manor · Perry Woods Estates | 5,555 | 67th | |
| I-65 / South Emerson | Arlington Meadows · Bradford Place · Buck Creek Meadows · Coventry Park · Epler Trace · Farhill Downs · Farhill Woods · Franklin Lake in the Woods · Garden Park South · Gray Arbor · Gray Fox Commons · Greystone · Highgate Estates · Maple Glen · Moss Creek · Perry Pines · Quail Creek · Southport Trace · Stone Mill · White Oak Farms · White Oak Woods · Woodlands & Meadows | 14,692 | 21st | |
| I-69 / Fall Creek | Avalon Hill East · Beechler Estates · Bolander Woods · Cardinal Cove · Castillia · Castlebrook · Castle Cove · Castle Ridge · Castleton Estates ·Castleton Farms · Copperfield · Creek Ridge · De Ville Place · Eagle Nest · Front Gate · Geist Landing · Glastonbury Court · Harbour Pines · Harrison Run · Heritage Park · Hunters Ridge · Knollwood · Knollwood Creek · Lake Castleton · Lantern Hills · Pinegrove · Pine Ridge Estates · Pinesprings · The Pines of Fall Creek · The Preserve at Fall Creek · The Sanctuary · Sargent Creek · Sargent Manor · Sargent Woods · Scarborough Village · Shadeland Station · Shadow Ridge · Summerwood · Village Manor · The Villages (Cape Cod Village · Champions Village · Fountain Village · Village Gate · Village Woods) · Yorkshire | 18,233 | 15th | |
| International Marketplace | Moller Village | 720 | 95th | |
| Irvington | Warren Park | 11,038 | 34th | |
| Key Meadows | Country Club Pines · Country Club Place · Country Village · Eagle Valley · The Islands · Liberty Oak · Mallard Green · Parc Estates North · Robey · Robey Glen · Sunningdale Commons · Tansel Creek · Tansel Crossing · Tansel Grove · Tansel Park · The Villages at Drake Landing · The Waterfront · Windham Lake | 10,276 | 37th | |
| Keystone at the Crossing | Crystal Lake · Lakes at the Crossing · River Crossing · River Ridge | 2,661 | 85th | |
| Lawrence | Benjamin Square · Briar Creek · Briar Run · Eagles at Winding Ridge · Greenbriar (mobile home community) · Harrison Park · North Lawrence Park · Northstone at Winding Ridge · Parkwood · Quail Creek · Spring Run at Winding Ridge · Spring Valley · Traditions · Winding Ridge · Wynfield | 26,478 | 6th | |
| Lawrence–Fort Ben–Oaklandon | Admirals Cove · Admirals Landing · Bay Ridge · Bradford Creek · Bradford Pointe · Carroll Crossing · Chesapeake · Cobblestone · Crossing South of Geist Harbours · Crystal Pointe · Eagle Pines · Echo Pointe · Fort Benjamin Harrison · Fountain Springs · Foxpointe · Geist Valley Estates · Glen Cove · Harrison Ridge · Hidden Oak · The Highlands at Geist · Indian Lake · Indian Pointe · Kensington Commons · Kensington Farms · Laurel Oaks · Lawrence Woods · Maple Bluffs · Maplewood · The North Woods at Geist · Oakland Hills · Oakland Woods · Oaklandon Meadows · Parkside Crossing · Pebblebrooke at Geist · Persimmon Creek · Persimmon Ridge · Ridge Creek Pines · River Oaks · Rosehaven · Seven Oaks · Sparrowood · Standish Estates at Fort Harrison · Sunnybrooke · Sunset Cove · Timber Ridge · Trilobi Hills · Watson Farms · Winona Place · Woods at Indian Lake | 23,068 | 9th | |
| Linden Wood | Carriage Estates · Cheyne Walk · Creekbend · Deerfield Village · Foothill Farms · Forrest Commons · Fox Ridge · Huddleston Estates · Meridian Woods Manor · Meridian Woods Park · Orchard Village · Parke Place · Southern Oaks · The Villages of Cobblestone (Berkley · Cambridge · Dartmouth · Oxford · Stanford) | 11,786 | 31st | |
| Mapleton–Fall Creek | | 6,829 | 54th | |
| Marian–Cold Springs | Cold Spring Estates · Kessler Wides at 30th Street | 3,242 | 84th | |
| Mars Hill | High Manor · Mann Village · Maywood Manor · Seerley Creek | 15,364 | 19th | |
| Martindale–Brightwood | | 12,578 | 27th | |
| Maywood | | 392 | 96th | |
| Meadows | Devon Woods | 6,561 | 58th | |
| Meridian Hills / Williams Creek | Arden · Beechwood Farm · Windcombe | 5,007 | 70th | |
| Meridian–Kessler | | 13,386 | 24th | |
| Millersville | Allison Commons · Brockton · Creekview Estates · Fall Creek Manor · Lake Maxinhall Estates · North Kessler Manor · Rolling Ridge · Wides Addition | 7,604 | 48th | |
| Near Eastside | Bosart Brown · Brookside · Cottage Home · Emerson Heights · Englewood · Fletcher–Lippencott · Forest Manor Park · Grace Tuxedo Park · Holy Cross · Hollywood Place · Little Flower · Otterbein · Rivoli Park · Robson–Voorhees · Rural–Sherman · St. Clair Place · Spades Park · Springdale · Westminster/St. Philip Neri · Willard Park · Woodruff Place | 30,356 | 3rd | |
| Near Northwest – Riverside | Golden Hill | 7,856 | 47th | |
| Near Northside | Fall Creek Place · Herron–Morton Place · Kennedy–King · Meridian Highland · Monon Yard · Old Northside · Reagan Park | 10,779 | 36th | |
| Near Southeast | Barrington · Bean Creek · Beech Crest · Norwood · Red Maple Grove | 15,871 | 18th | |
| Near Southside | Bates–Hendricks · Old Southside | 6,102 | 62nd | |
| Near Westside | 58/Bahr at Central State · Bolton Square at Central State · Fairfax · Haughville · Hawthorne · Stringtown · Westside | 19,054 | 11th | |
| New Bethel | Fox Hollow · Hunters Crossing · Indigo Run · Sagebrook · Wolf Run | 3,948 | 77th | |
| Nora / Far Northside | Belle Meade · Cedar Knolls · College Commons · Driftwood Hills · Sherwood Forest · Willowood | 8,314 | 44th | |
| North Central | Muir Woods · Mystic Bay · Oxbow · Shore Acres · Solana at the Crossing | 3,311 | 82nd | |
| North Perry | Frog Holler · Marquis Manor · Meridian Gardens | 6,809 | 55th | |
| Northwest High School | Eagles Knoll · Falcons Nest · Gateway West · Hidden Bay · Lakeside Manor · The Willows · Woodland Place | 18,915 | 12th | |
| Park 100 | | 94 | 99th | |
| Park Fletcher | | 788 | 94th | |
| Poplar Grove | Arlington Commons · Ashland · Big Run · Chessington Grove · Churchman Estates · Churchman Manor · Copper Grove · Crystal Lake · Franklin Crossing · Hickory Knoll · Newberry Glen · Spring Lake | 5,898 | 65th | |
| Ravenswood | Dawnbury–Keystone | 1,799 | 92nd | |
| Raymond Park | Brookfield Place · Greythorne · Mayfair at Raymond Park · Raymond Park Village · Willow Lakes · The Woods at Liberty Park | 5,268 | 68th | |
| Snacks / Guion Creek | Augusta Meadows · Bradford Meadows · Brookstone · Cheswick Place · Countrybrook · Country Farms · Deer Creek Estates · Eagle Creek North · Eagle Trace Village · Falcon Lakes · Fieldstone · Georgetown Crossing · Guion Lakes · Guion Pointe Kessler Greene · Liberty Creek North and South · Morningside · Northern Estates · Oakforge · The Pines · Robertson Village · Saddlebrook · Shadow Pointe · Spring Creek · Stratford Glen · Twin Creek · Wood Creek | 29,592 | 4th | |
| South Franklin | Abbey Road · Abbington · Bel Moore · Bentley Commons · Bentley Estates · Bentley Farms · Birchwood Park · Brookston · Crossroads at Southport · Edenwilde · Feather Run · Feather Trace · Flat Branch Estates · Franklin Meadows · Franklin Parke Estates · Ironstone · Keeneland Crest · Lakeland Trails · McGregor Highlands · Meadowbend · Misty Woods · Pine Lake · Princeton Lakes · Red Fox Woods · Smithfield · Southern Lakes · Southern Ridge · Southern Springs · Southern Trails · Stone Briar · Stone Bridge · Stone Creek · Sycamore Run · Timberfield · Timberlakes · Westbrooke | 18,915 | 12th | |
| South Perry | Averly Park · Grand View Acres and Southgate Farms · Gray Farm Estates · Greenbrooke · Harvard Square · LaScala Villas · The Maples · McFarland Farms · Pleasant Lake Estates · Richmond Hill · Sherman Commons · Sherman Oaks · Southridge Square · Southwood · The Springs · Sterling Ridge · Summer Walk · Whitaker Valley · Whitaker Valley Estates · Winchester Village | 26,675 | 5th | |
| Southdale | Bluff Manor · Crosscreek · Meridian Place · Orchard Park · Orchard View Estates · Rosebrock Estates | 5,570 | 66th | |
| Southeast | Addison Meadows · Foxfire · Franklin Gardens · Wallace Crossing · Woodland Trails | 6,540 | 59th | |
| Southeast Warren | Bade Woods · Cedar Springs · Creekside Meadows · Creekside Woods · Creekwood Hills · Forest Creek · Grassy Creek · Grassy Village · Hamptons · Hidden Lake Estates · Irongate · Lakes at Grassy Creek · Muesing Farms · Paddock · Stable Chase · Treyburn Green · Washington Trail · Whispering Pines · The Woods at Grassy Creek · Woodsong | 9,206 | 41st | |
| Southern Dunes | Arrowhead at Southern Dunes · Bayberry Village · Buck Creek Village · Cedar Park · Cheyenne Lakes at Southern Dunes · Chippewa Lakes at Southern Dunes · Governors Pointe · Hudson Bay at Southern Dunes · Huron Lakes at Southern Dunes · Pawnee Ridge at Southern Dunes · The Villas at Lake Lakota · Whispering Falls · Wichita Falls at Southern Dunes | 7,974 | 46th | |
| Southport | Justus Southern Manor Estates | 2,123 | 89th | |
| Speedway | | 15,136 | 20th | |
| St. Vincent / Greenbriar | Alverna · Bridgefield · Eden Woods · Golden Oaks · Homestead Lakes · Mayfield · Northbrook · North Willow Farms · Pickwick Commons · Pickwick Drive · Pickwick Farms · Somerset Hills · Tamarack · Williamshire · Williston Green | 14,674 | 22nd | |
| Stout Field | Drexel Gardens | 5,930 | 64th | |
| Sunshine Gardens | Bluff View Meadow | 1,393 | 93rd | |
| Traders Point | Chestnut Hills · Eagle Creek Manor · Hunters Green · Huntington · Normandy Farms · Pike Wood · Woods at Traders Point | 6,661 | 56th | |
| University Heights | Carson Heights · Rosedale Hills | 12,452 | 29th | |
| Valley Mills | Cardinal Village · Copeland Mills Estates · Decatur Commons · Decatur Ridge · Emerald Village · River Run · Timberleaf · Wedgewood | 12,460 | 28th | |
| Wanamaker | Marlin Meadows | 2,210 | 88th | |
| West Indianapolis | The Valley | 7,056 | 53rd | |
| West Newton | Crossfield · Oak Trace | 2,030 | 90th | |
| Wynnedale / Spring Hill | | 4,273 | 73rd | |
| Marion County | — | 977,203 | Total | |

== See also ==
- Indianapolis Cultural Districts
- Indianapolis Historic Preservation Commission
- Unigov
