= Warren Park, Indiana =

- Town
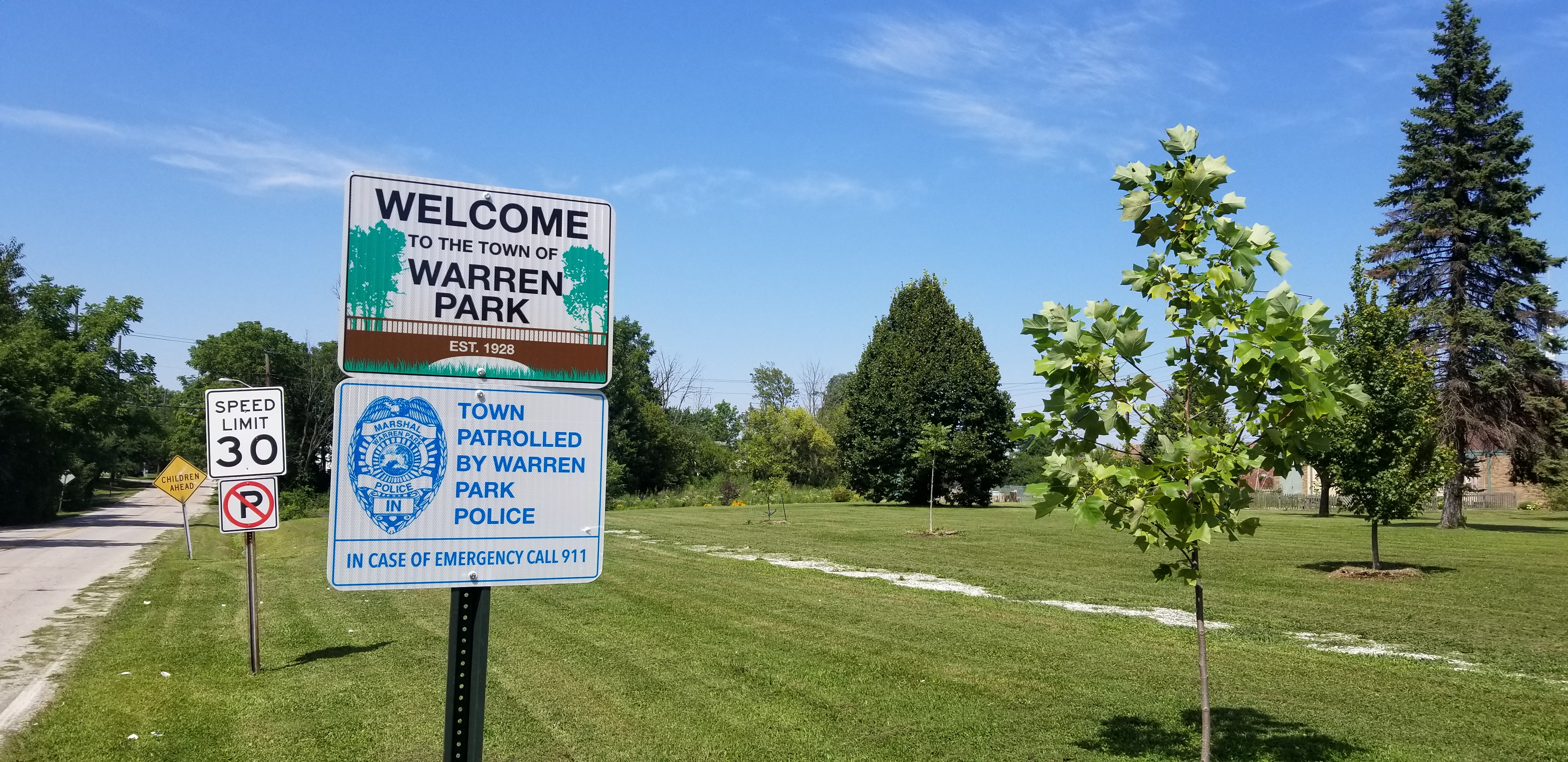

- Location in Marion County, Indiana
- Coordinates: 39°47′00″N 86°03′06″W
- Country: United States
- State: Indiana
- County: Marion
- Township: Warren

Area
  - Total: 0.45 sq mi (1.17 km^{2})
  - Land: 0.45 sq mi (1.17 km^{2})
  - Water: 0 sq mi (0.00 km^{2})
- Elevation: 824 ft (251 m)

Population (2020)
  - Total: 1,490
  - Density: 3,293/sq mi (1,271.4/km^{2})
- Time zone: UTC-5 (Eastern (EST))
  - Summer (DST): UTC-4 (EDT)
- ZIP code: 46219
- Area codes: 317 and 463
- FIPS code: 18-80234
- GNIS feature ID: 2397724

Warren Park is a town in Warren Township, Marion County, Indiana, United States. Its borders reach into the Eastgate, Eastside, and Irvington neighborhoods. The north is bordered by 16th Street, Shadeland Avenue and North Edmondson Avenue to the east, North Ridgeview Drive and East Pleasant Parkway South Drive to the west, and Perry Drive borders the south. The population was 1,490 at the 2020 census. It has existed as an "included town" since 1970, when it was incorporated into Indianapolis as part of Unigov. It is part of Indianapolis, but retains a functioning town government under IC 36-3-1-11.

== History ==
Warren Park is named after American Founding Father, Joseph Warren and was platted in 1913. It was a small farming community at the time it was platted, eventually growing to a residential area.

== Geography ==
Warren Park is located in eastern Marion County and is 6 miles (10 km) east of downtown Indianapolis.

According to the U.S. Census Bureau, Warren Park has a total area of 0.45 square miles (1.17 km^{2}), all of it recorded as land. Pleasant Run Creek flows through the west side of the town, running southwest to join the White River south of downtown Indianapolis.

== Demographics ==
Historical population
Census	Pop.	Note	%±
1930	164		—
1940	237		44.5%
1950	336		41.8%
1960	852		153.6%
1970	1,887		121.5%
1980	1,803		−4.5%
1990	1,763		−2.2%
2000	1,656		−6.1%
2010	1,480		−10.6%
2020	1,490		0.7%
U.S. Decennial Census

=== 2020 census ===
As of the 2020 census, Warren Park had a population of 1,490. The median age was 53.8 years. 16.6% of residents were under the age of 18 and 31.7% of residents were 65 years of age or older. For every 100 females there were 80.2 males, and for every 100 females age 18 and over there were 76.2 males age 18 and over.

100.0% of residents lived in urban areas, while 0.0% lived in rural areas.

There were 798 households in Warren Park, of which 19.7% had children under the age of 18 living in them. Of all households, 24.1% were married-couple households, 22.9% were households with a male householder and no spouse or partner present, and 47.4% were households with a female householder and no spouse or partner present. About 52.1% of all households were made up of individuals and 36.6% had someone living alone who was 65 years of age or older.

There were 965 housing units, of which 17.3% were vacant. The homeowner vacancy rate was 2.5% and the rental vacancy rate was 19.5%.

Racial composition as of the 2020 census
Race	Number	Percent
White	938	63.0%
Black or African American	375	25.2%
American Indian and Alaska Native	1	0.1%
Asian	10	0.7%
Native Hawaiian and Other Pacific Islander	2	0.1%
Some other race	54	3.6%
Two or more races	110	7.4%
Hispanic or Latino (of any race)	130	8.7%

=== 2010 census ===
As of the census of 2010, there were 1,480 people, 814 households, and 307 families living in the town. The population density was 3,288.9 inhabitants per square mile (1,269.9/km^{2}). There were 1,023 housing units at an average density of 2,273.3 per square mile (877.7/km^{2}). The racial makeup of the town was 78.6% White, 16.1% African American, 0.1% Native American, 0.2% Asian, 3.0% from other races, and 1.9% from two or more races. Hispanic or Latino of any race were 7.3% of the population.

There were 814 households, of which 17.2% had children under the age of 18 living with them, 23.0% were married couples living together, 11.3% had a female householder with no husband present, 3.4% had a male householder with no wife present, and 62.3% were non-families. 58.1% of all households were made up of individuals, and 39.5% had someone living alone who was 65 years of age or older. The average household size was 1.82 and the average family size was 2.93.

The median age in the town was 50.5 years. 18.4% of residents were under the age of 18; 5.7% were between the ages of 18 and 24; 18.1% were from 25 to 44; 27.4% were from 45 to 64; and 30.5% were 65 years of age or older. The gender makeup of the town was 41.9% male and 58.1% female.

=== 2000 census ===
As of the census of 2000, there were 1,656 people, 915 households, and 373 families living in the town. The population density was 3,683.3 inhabitants per square mile (1,422.1/km^{2}). There were 996 housing units at an average density of 2,215.3 per square mile (855.3/km^{2}). The racial makeup of the town was 92.15% White, 4.47% African American, 0.24% Native American, 0.91% Asian, 0.60% from other races, and 1.63% from two or more races. Hispanic or Latino of any race were 1.45% of the population.

There were 915 households, out of which 16.2% had children under the age of 18 living with them, 28.5% were married couples living together, 9.5% had a female householder with no husband present, and 59.2% were non-families. 56.0% of all households were made up of individuals, and 44.6% had someone living alone who was 65 years of age or older. The average household size was 1.81 and the average family size was 2.77.

In the town, the population was spread out, with 17.9% under the age of 18, 5.4% from 18 to 24, 21.3% from 25 to 44, 18.5% from 45 to 64, and 37.0% who were 65 years of age or older. The median age was 50 years. For every 100 females, there were 67.3 males. For every 100 females age 18 and over, there were 60.8 males.

The median income for a household in the town was $25,185, and the median income for a family was $46,384. Males had a median income of $41,607 versus $25,658 for females. The per capita income for the town was $24,836. About 4.9% of families and 6.2% of the population were below the poverty line, including 1.7% of those under age 18 and 9.6% of those age 65 or over.

== Education ==
It is in the Warren Township Metropolitan School District. The zoned elementary school is Hawthorne Elementary School.

The comprehensive high school is Warren Central High School.

== See also ==
- List of cities surrounded by another city
- List of neighborhoods in Indianapolis
