= Homecroft, Indiana =

- Town
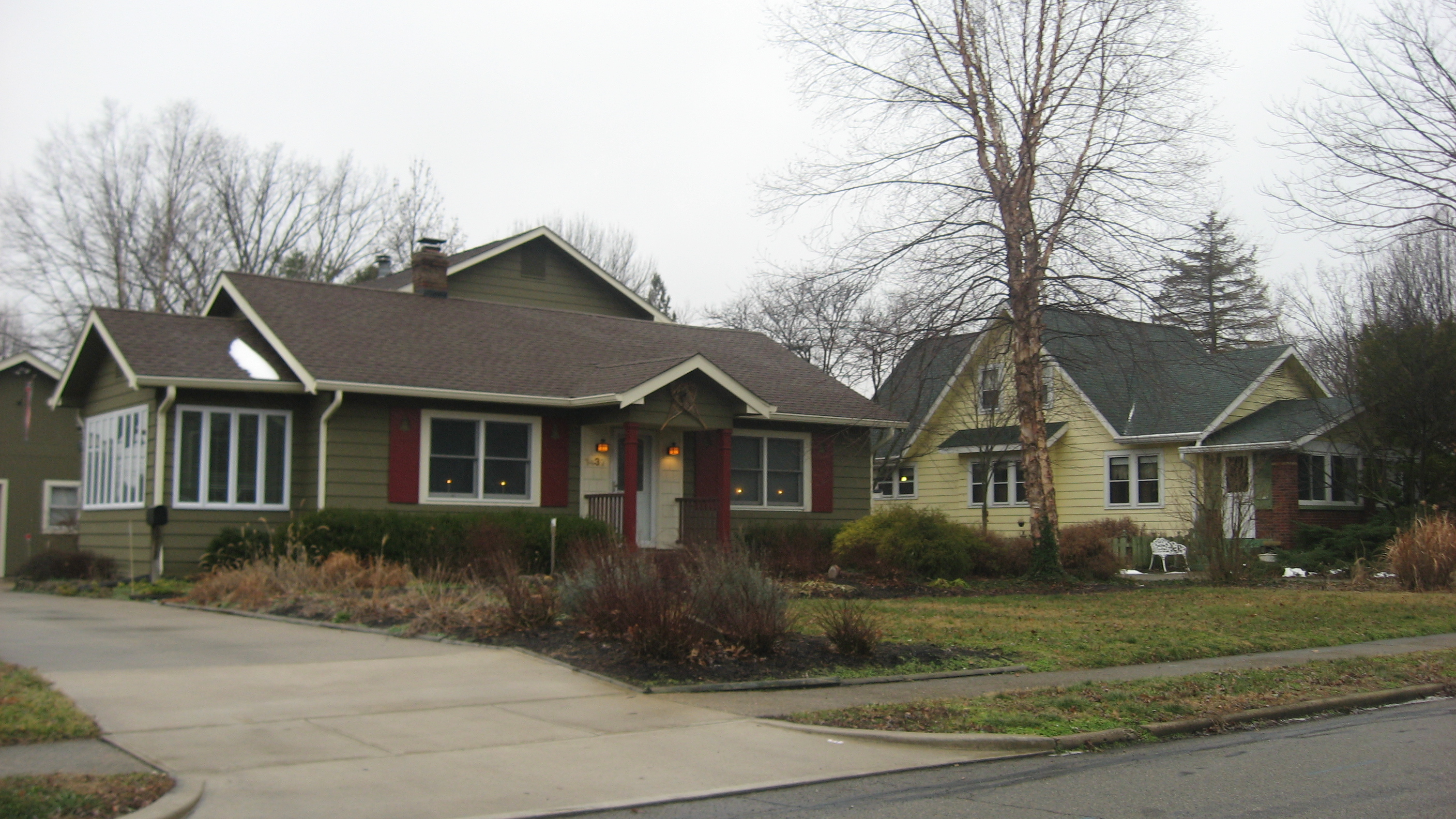
- Houses on Maynard Drive

- Logo

- Location in Marion County, Indiana
- Coordinates: 39°40′08″N 86°07′42″W
- Country: United States
- State: Indiana
- County: Marion
- Township: Perry
- Founded: 1923
- Incorporated: 1949
- Consolidation with Unigov: 1970

Area
  - Total: 0.24 sq mi (0.62 km^{2})
  - Land: 0.24 sq mi (0.62 km^{2})
  - Water: 0 sq mi (0.00 km^{2})
- Elevation: 755 ft (230 m)

Population (2020)
  - Total: 752
  - Density: 3,132.4/sq mi (1,209.42/km^{2})
- Time zone: UTC-5 (EST)
  - Summer (DST): UTC-4 (EDT)
- ZIP Code: 46227
- Area codes: 317/463
- FIPS code: 18-34420
- GNIS feature ID: 2396999
- Website: www.townofhomecroftin.gov

Homecroft is a town in Perry Township, Marion County, Indiana, United States. The population was 752 at the 2020 census. Incorporated in 1949, it has existed as an included town since 1970, when it was incorporated into Indianapolis as part of Unigov. It is part of Indianapolis, but retains a functioning town government under IC 36-3-1-11.

== History ==
Homecroft began in 1923 when Frank Gates and his son Oliver bought 150 acres (61 ha) and, after working with the Works Progress Administration in the early 1930s to install storm sewers to drain the swampy area, started selling lots on 80 acres (32 ha). The development's location close to the interurban line in the 1930s and 1940s, and, as the automobile became prominent, to Madison Avenue in the 1950s and 1960s, made it popular for prospective suburban homeowners.

The town was incorporated in 1949. Two additional sections of 40 acres (16 ha) and 30 acres (12 ha), respectively, were developed in the early 1950s.

The town was designed to be exclusively residential, although a few commercial establishments have been built along Madison Avenue. A large portion of the town has been recognized on the National Register of Historic Places as the Homecroft Historic District.

== Geography ==
Homecroft is located in southern Marion County. It is bounded roughly by Banta Road, the Louisville and Indiana Railroad tracks, Tulip Drive and Shelby Street. The town of Southport borders the south side of Homecroft.

According to the U.S. Census Bureau, Homecroft has a total area of 0.24 square miles (0.62 km^{2}), all land.

== Government ==
The Homecroft town council has five elected members. Besides passing ordinances, resolutions, orders and motions for the town's government, the council also controls the city's property and finances.

The chief of police is appointed by the council. James D. Leonard is the current chief.

== Demographics ==
Homecroft, Indiana – Racial and ethnic composition Note: the US Census treats Hispanic/Latino as an ethnic category. This table excludes Latinos from the racial categories and assigns them to a separate category. Hispanics/Latinos may be of any race.
Race / Ethnicity (NH = Non-Hispanic)	Pop 2000	Pop 2010	Pop 2020	% 2000	% 2010	% 2020
White alone (NH)	737	688	630	98.14%	95.29%	83.78%
Black or African American alone (NH)	1	5	9	0.13%	0.69%	1.20%
Native American or Alaska Native alone (NH)	0	5	0	0.00%	0.69%	0.00%
Asian alone (NH)	3	5	55	0.40%	0.69%	7.31%
Native Hawaiian or Pacific Islander alone (NH)	0	0	1	0.00%	0.00%	0.13%
Other race alone (NH)	0	1	0	0.00%	0.14%	0.00%
Mixed race or Multiracial (NH)	4	10	20	0.53%	1.39%	2.66%
Hispanic or Latino (any race)	6	8	37	0.80%	1.11%	4.92%
Total	751	722	752	100.00%	100.00%	100.00%

Historical population
Census	Pop.	Note	%±
1880	388		—
1890	324		−16.5%
1900	285		−12.0%
1910	352		23.5%
1920	458		30.1%
1930	521		13.8%
1940	549		5.4%
1950	730		33.0%
1960	892		22.2%
1970	2,342		162.6%
1980	2,266		−3.2%
1990	1,969		−13.1%
2000	1,852		−5.9%
2010	1,712		−7.6%
2020	2,123		24.0%
U.S. Decennial Census

Historical population
Census	Pop.	Note	%±
1950	659		—
1960	959		45.5%
1970	964		0.5%
1980	831		−13.8%
1990	758		−8.8%
2000	751		−0.9%
2010	722		−3.9%
2020	752		4.2%
U.S. Decennial Census

=== 2010 census ===
At the 2010 census, there were 722 people, 308 households and 214 families living in the town. The population density was 3,008.3 per square mile (1,161.5/km^{2}). There were 323 housing units at an average density of 1,345.8 per square mile (519.6/km^{2}). The racial make-up of the town was 95.7% White, 0.8% African American, 0.7% Native American, 0.7% Asian, 0.6% from other races and 1.5% from two or more races. Hispanic or Latino of any race were 1.1% of the population.

There were 308 households, of which 28.2% had children under the age of 18 living with them, 55.2% were married couples living together, 11.7% had a female householder with no husband present, 2.6% had a male householder with no wife present and 30.5% were non-families. 26.3% of all households were made up of individuals, and 8.5% had someone living alone who was 65 years of age or older. The average household size was 2.34 and the average family size was 2.82.

The median age was 41.2 years. 21.6% of residents were under the age of 18, 6.4% were between the ages of 18 and 24, 27.2% were from 25 to 44, 32.2% were from 45 to 64 and 12.7% were 65 years of age or older. The sex make-up of the town was 46.7% male and 53.3% female.

=== 2000 census ===
As of the 2000 census, there were 751 people, 310 households and 227 families living in the town. The population density was 3,243.5 per square mile (1,252.3/km^{2}). There were 316 housing units at an average density of 1,364.8 per square mile (527.0/km^{2}). The racial make-up of the town was 98.67% White, 0.13% African American, 0.40% Asian, 0.27% from other races and 0.53% from two or more races. Hispanic or Latino of any race were 0.80% of the population.

There were 310 households, of which 26.8% had children under the age of 18 living with them, 63.9% were married couples living together, 7.4% had a female householder with no husband present and 26.5% were non-families. 22.6% of all households were made up of individuals, and 8.4% had someone living alone who was 65 years of age or older. The average household size was 2.42 and the average family size was 2.81.

21.8% of the population were under the age of 18, 6.4% from 18 to 24, 29.2% from 25 to 44, 29.0% from 45 to 64 and 13.6% were 65 years of age or older. The median age was 41 years. For every 100 females, there were 101.3 males. For every 100 females age 18 and over, there were 92.5 males.

The median household income was $60,156 and the median family income was $70,859. Males had a median income of $51,563 and females $38,194. The per capita income was $28,888. About 1.3% of families and 2.1% of the population were below the poverty line, including 1.3% of those under age 18 and none of those age 65 or over.

== Education ==
It is in the Perry Township Schools. Zoned schools include Homecroft Kindergarten, Homecroft Elementary School, Southport Middle School, and Southport High School.

== See also ==
- List of cities surrounded by another city
- List of neighborhoods in Indianapolis
