= Warren Township, Marion County, Indiana =

Warren Township Marion County
- Township
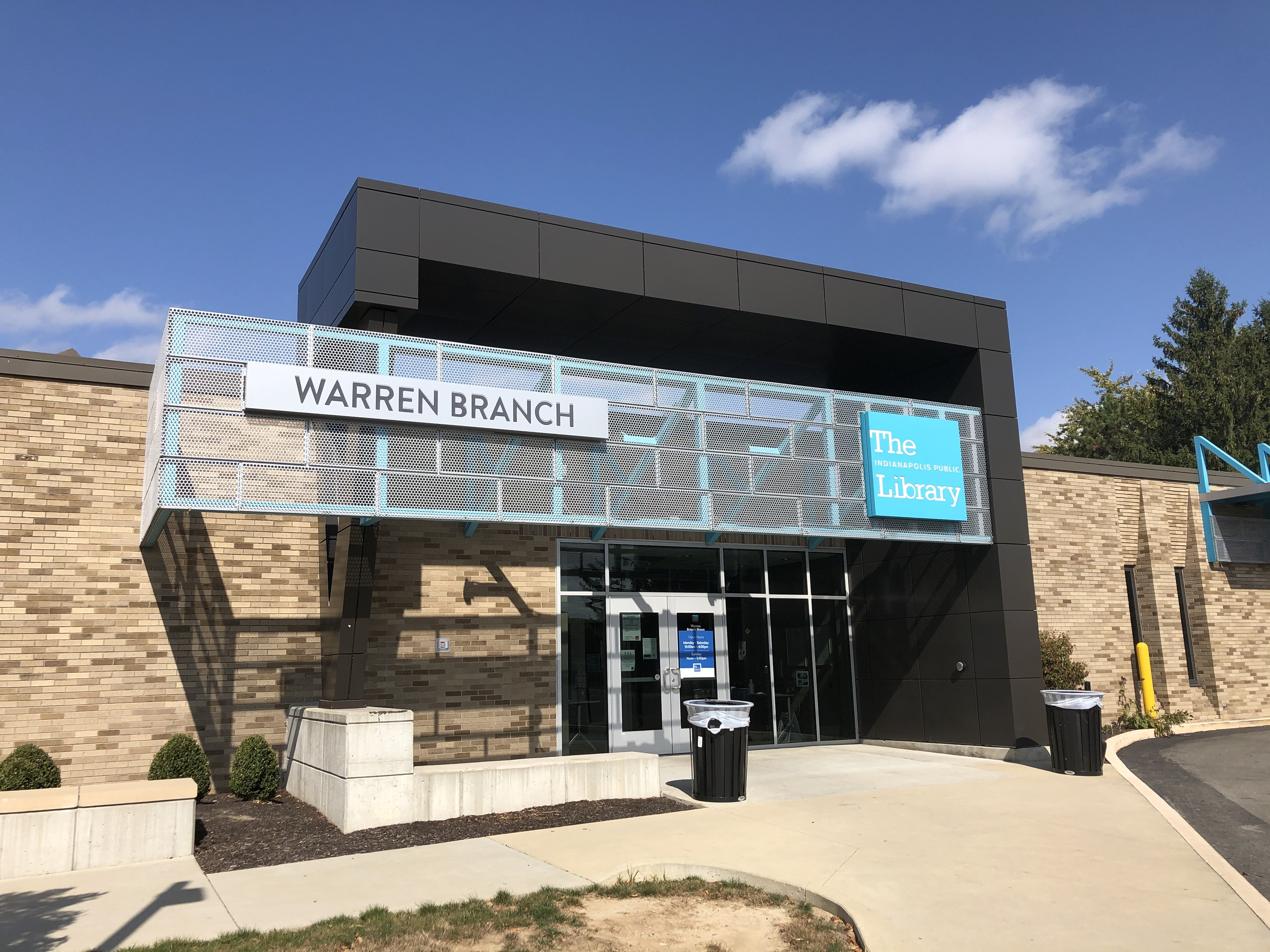
- Indianapolis Public Library Warren Branch

- Coordinates: 39°46′30″N 86°01′02″W
- Country: United States
- State: Indiana
- County: Marion
- Named for: Joseph Warren

Government
  - Type: Indiana township

Area
  - Total: 48.44 sq mi (125.45 km^{2})
  - Land: 48.3 sq mi (125.2 km^{2})
  - Water: 0.097 sq mi (0.25 km^{2})
- Elevation: 860 ft (262 m)

Population (2020)
  - Total: 106,191
  - Density: 2,197/sq mi (848.2/km^{2})
- FIPS code: 18-80144
- GNIS feature ID: 453976
- Website: www.warrentownshiptrustee.org

Warren Township is one of nine townships in Marion County, Indiana. As of the 2020 census, its population was 106,191, up from 99,433 at 2010. Warren Township was named for Joseph Warren.

Warren Central High School, Creston Middle School, and Raymond Park Middle School are located within the township.

Historical population
| Census | Pop. | Note | %± |
|---|---|---|---|
| 1890 | 2,854 | | — |
| 1900 | 3,942 | | 38.1% |
| 1910 | 6,093 | | 54.6% |
| 1920 | 9,380 | | 53.9% |
| 1930 | 17,899 | | 90.8% |
| 1940 | 22,060 | | 23.2% |
| 1950 | 33,948 | | 53.9% |
| 1960 | 60,344 | | 77.8% |
| 1970 | 87,238 | | 44.6% |
| 1980 | 89,208 | | 2.3% |
| 1990 | 87,989 | | −1.4% |
| 2000 | 93,941 | | 6.8% |
| 2010 | 99,433 | | 5.8% |
| 2020 | 106,191 | | 6.8% |
Source: US Decennial Census

== Geography ==
=== Municipalities ===
- Beech Grove (small portion)
- Cumberland (west half)
- Indianapolis (partial)
- Warren Park

=== Communities ===
- Eastgate
- Irvington
