= Clermont, Indiana =

- Town
- Seal

- Location in Marion County, Indiana
- Coordinates: 39°48′59″N 86°19′14″W
- Country: United States
- State: Indiana
- County: Marion
- Township: Pike, Wayne

Area
  - Total: 0.67 sq mi (1.73 km^{2})
  - Land: 0.67 sq mi (1.73 km^{2})
  - Water: 0 sq mi (0.00 km^{2})
- Elevation: 833 ft (254 m)

Population (2020)
  - Total: 1,384
  - Density: 2,073/sq mi (800.3/km^{2})
- Time zone: UTC-5 (EST)
  - Summer (DST): UTC-4 (EDT)
- ZIP code: 46234
- Area code: 317
- FIPS code: 18-13492
- GNIS feature ID: 2396654
- Website: clermont.in.gov

Clermont is a town in Pike and Wayne townships of Marion County, Indiana, United States. The population was 1,384 at the 2020 census. It has existed as an "included town" since 1970, when it was incorporated into Indianapolis as part of Unigov. It is legally part of Indianapolis, while retaining a town government under IC 36-3-2-5. The city is known for hosting Lucas Oil Raceway at Indianapolis, consisting of one of the nation's premier short-track ovals and also the premier American drag racing event, the NHRA U.S. Nationals.

== History ==
The first post office at Clermont was established in 1831. Clermont was laid out in 1849, and was initially named "Mechanicsburg".

== Geography ==
Clermont is located in western Marion County. It is bordered to the west by the town of Brownsburg in Hendricks County. U.S. Route 136 (Crawfordsville Road) passes through the northern part of town, leading northwest 4 miles (6 km) to the center of Brownsburg and 34 miles (55 km) to Crawfordsville. Downtown Indianapolis is 10 miles (16 km) to the southeast of Clermont.

According to the U.S. Census Bureau, Clermont has a total area of 0.67 square miles (1.74 km^{2}), all land.

== Demographics ==
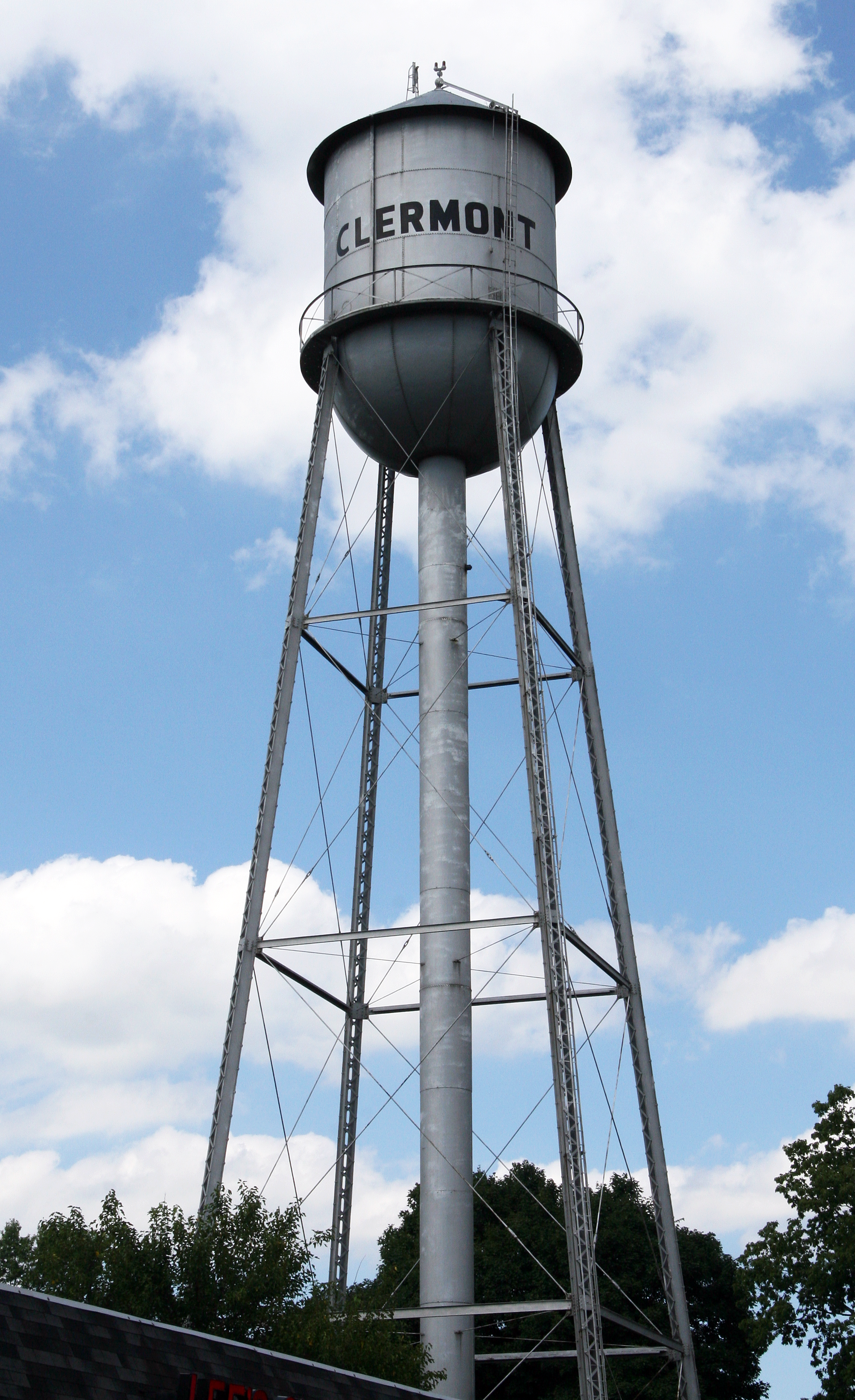
The old water tower

Historical population
| Census | Pop. | Note | %± |
|---|---|---|---|
| 1880 | 215 | | — |
| 1910 | 205 | | — |
| 1920 | 240 | | 17.1% |
| 1930 | 448 | | 86.7% |
| 1940 | 465 | | 3.8% |
| 1950 | 824 | | 77.2% |
| 1960 | 1,058 | | 28.4% |
| 1970 | 1,423 | | 34.5% |
| 1980 | 1,671 | | 17.4% |
| 1990 | 1,678 | | 0.4% |
| 2000 | 1,477 | | −12.0% |
| 2010 | 1,356 | | −8.2% |
| 2020 | 1,384 | | 2.1% |
U.S. Decennial Census

=== 2020 census ===
As of the 2020 census, Clermont had a population of 1,384. The median age was 46.0 years. 19.4% of residents were under the age of 18 and 20.4% of residents were 65 years of age or older. For every 100 females there were 96.0 males, and for every 100 females age 18 and over there were 87.1 males age 18 and over.

100.0% of residents lived in urban areas, while 0.0% lived in rural areas.

There were 587 households in Clermont, of which 27.4% had children under the age of 18 living in them. Of all households, 48.4% were married-couple households, 17.7% were households with a male householder and no spouse or partner present, and 25.7% were households with a female householder and no spouse or partner present. About 24.6% of all households were made up of individuals and 9.7% had someone living alone who was 65 years of age or older.

There were 629 housing units, of which 6.7% were vacant. The homeowner vacancy rate was 2.2% and the rental vacancy rate was 9.4%.

Racial composition as of the 2020 census
| Race | Number | Percent |
|---|---|---|
| White | 1,175 | 84.9% |
| Black or African American | 57 | 4.1% |
| American Indian and Alaska Native | 11 | 0.8% |
| Asian | 8 | 0.6% |
| Native Hawaiian and Other Pacific Islander | 0 | 0.0% |
| Some other race | 40 | 2.9% |
| Two or more races | 93 | 6.7% |
| Hispanic or Latino (of any race) | 92 | 6.6% |

=== 2000 census ===
As of the census of 2000, there were 1,477 people, 598 households, and 420 families residing in the town. The population density was 2,167.7 inhabitants per square mile (837.0/km^{2}). There were 626 housing units at an average density of 918.7 per square mile (354.7/km^{2}). The racial makeup of the town was 96.41% White, 1.62% African American, 0.07% Native American, 1.22% Asian, and 0.68% from two or more races. Hispanic or Latino of any race were 0.74% of the population.

There were 598 households, out of which 28.8% had children under the age of 18 living with them, 58.4% were married couples living together, 9.2% had a female householder with no husband present, and 29.6% were non-families. 22.7% of all households were made up of individuals, and 6.7% had someone living alone who was 65 years of age or older. The average household size was 2.47 and the average family size was 2.92.

In the town, the population was spread out, with 23.3% under the age of 18, 5.7% from 18 to 24, 30.5% from 25 to 44, 26.3% from 45 to 64, and 14.2% who were 65 years of age or older. The median age was 40 years. For every 100 females, there were 98.8 males. For every 100 females age 18 and over, there were 91.7 males.

The median income for a household in the town was $51,875, and the median income for a family was $64,464. Males had a median income of $40,500 versus $27,974 for females. The per capita income for the town was $25,149. About 4.0% of families and 6.8% of the population were below the poverty line, including 7.4% of those under age 18 and 12.8% of those age 65 or over.

== Notable people ==
- Tim Cindric – president of Team Penske Racing
- Eric Holcomb – 51st governor of Indiana
- Jim Hurtubise – racecar driver, 1960 Indianapolis 500 Rookie of the Year, drove in 10 Indianapolis 500s
- Mike Mosley – racecar driver, drove in 15 Indianapolis 500s
- Dick Simon – racecar driver and Dick Simon Racing team owner, drove in 17 Indianapolis 500s

== See also ==
- List of cities surrounded by another city
- List of neighborhoods in Indianapolis
