= Meridian Woods Park =

Neighborhood in Indianapolis, Indiana, US

Meridian Woods Park is a residential neighborhood located on the south side of Indianapolis, Indiana, United States. It is home to the Meridian Woods Marlins swim team. Children in the neighborhood attend the schools of the Metropolitan School District of Perry Township.

== See also ==
- List of neighborhoods in Indianapolis
