= Arden, Indianapolis =

Neighborhood in Indianapolis, Indiana, US

Coordinates: 39°52′53″N 86°08′55″W

Arden is an affluent residential neighborhood on the north side of Indianapolis, Indiana. The neighborhood is about a 15-minute drive from downtown Indianapolis. It is bounded by 71st Street on the north, Meridian Street on the west, College Avenue on the east, and the White River on the south. Arden is north of the Broad Ripple Village neighborhood and south of the community of Meridian Hills.

== History ==
Arden sits on acreage that was originally part of the Walter Johnson farm. In 1910, 14 acres (5.7 ha) were sold by the Johnsons to the Van Sants for their family estate. In 1922, the Van Sants platted a small subdivision on 12 acres (4.9 ha) and the Johnsons platted a larger subdivision on 112 acres (45 ha) of their farm. Both subdivisions failed and resulted in only a single house being built in 1927. Both subdivisions were vacated the following year.

In 1929, 126 acres (51 ha) were purchased from the Johnsons by the Arden Realty Group which then subdivided the property. The first home in the Arden development was constructed in 1929, but construction ceased during the Depression. In 1931, a new show home was built and in a couple of years construction resumed in the Arden neighborhood. Most homes were constructed during the neighborhood's first twenty years; however, there have been a handful of homes constructed more recently. Homes in Arden vary in size and are built in a mix of traditional styles and vary greatly in price from $175,000 for the most modest to nearly $3 million for the most grand.

Arden remains a quiet, established neighborhood where several residents have lived for two or more generations.

== See also ==
- List of neighborhoods in Indianapolis
