= Wayne Township, Marion County, Indiana =

Wayne Township Marion County
- Township
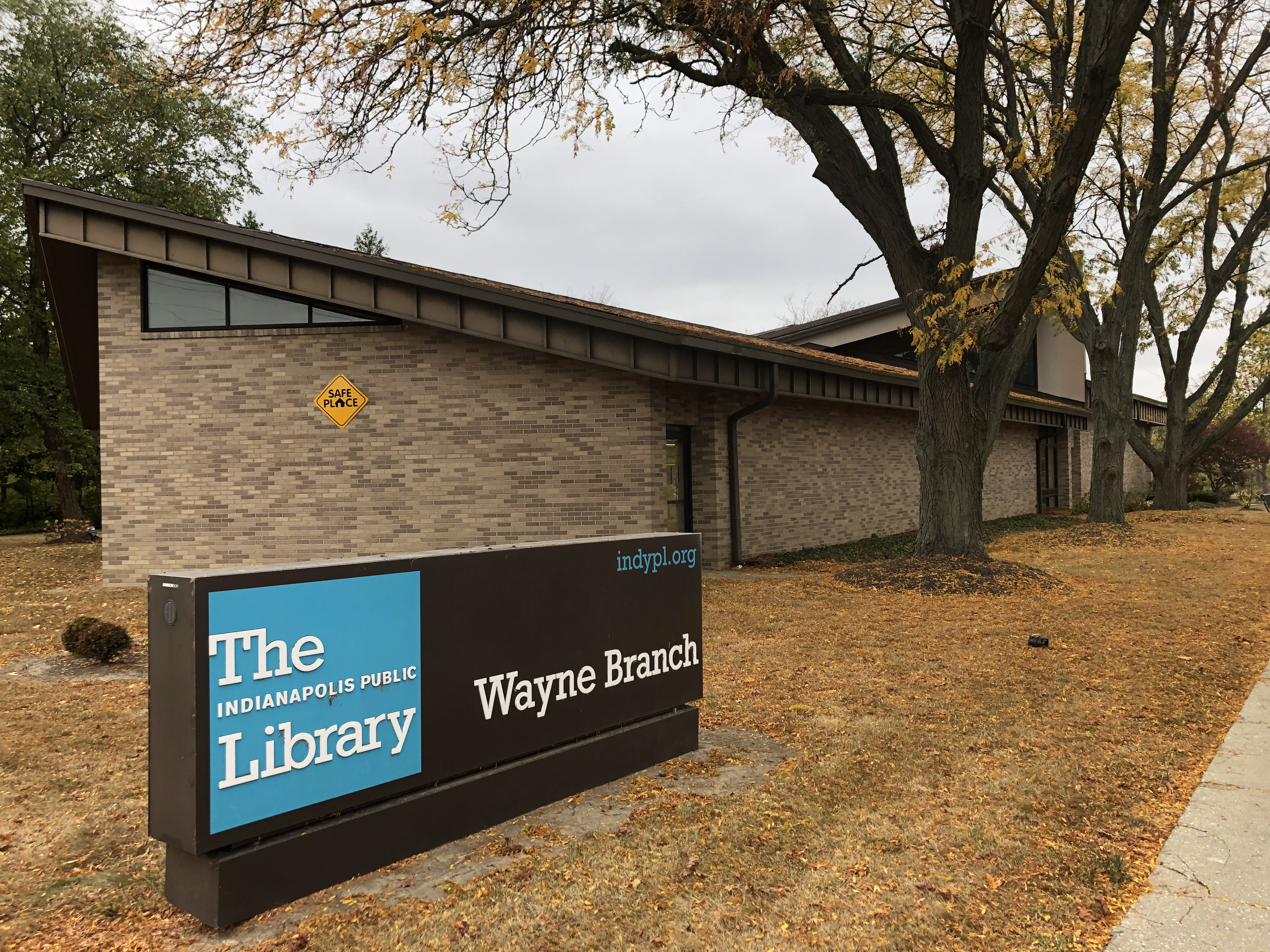
- Indianapolis Public Library Wayne Branch

- Coordinates: 39°46′16″N 86°15′41″W
- Country: United States
- State: Indiana
- County: Marion
- Named for: Anthony Wayne

Government
  - Type: Indiana township

Area
  - Total: 49.30 sq mi (127.68 km^{2})
  - Land: 48.90 sq mi (126.65 km^{2})
  - Water: 0.40 sq mi (1.04 km^{2})
- Elevation: 781 ft (238 m)

Population (2020)
  - Total: 148,444
  - Density: 3,035.7/sq mi (1,172.1/km^{2})
- FIPS code: 18-81800
- GNIS feature ID: 454035
- Website: www.waynetwp.org

Wayne Township is one of nine townships in Marion County, Indiana. As of the 2010 census, its population was 136,828. The school district is Metropolitan School District of Wayne Township.

Historical population
Census	Pop.	Note	%±
1890	7,949		—
1900	11,146		40.2%
1910	20,131		80.6%
1920	27,551		36.9%
1930	43,519		58.0%
1940	48,811		12.2%
1950	70,798		45.0%
1960	99,722		40.9%
1970	126,234		26.6%
1980	122,809		−2.7%
1990	125,699		2.4%
2000	133,461		6.2%
2010	136,828		2.5%
2020	148,444		8.5%
Source: US Decennial Census

== Geography ==
=== Municipalities ===
- Clermont (south half)
- Indianapolis (partial)
- Speedway

=== Communities ===
- Airport (north half)
- Avon Creek Estates
- Bridgeport
- Chapel Hill / Ben Davis
- Eagledale
- Haughville (vast majority)
- Mars Hill (partial)
- Park Fletcher
- Riverside (small portion)
