= Perry Township, Marion County, Indiana =

Perry Township Marion County
- Township
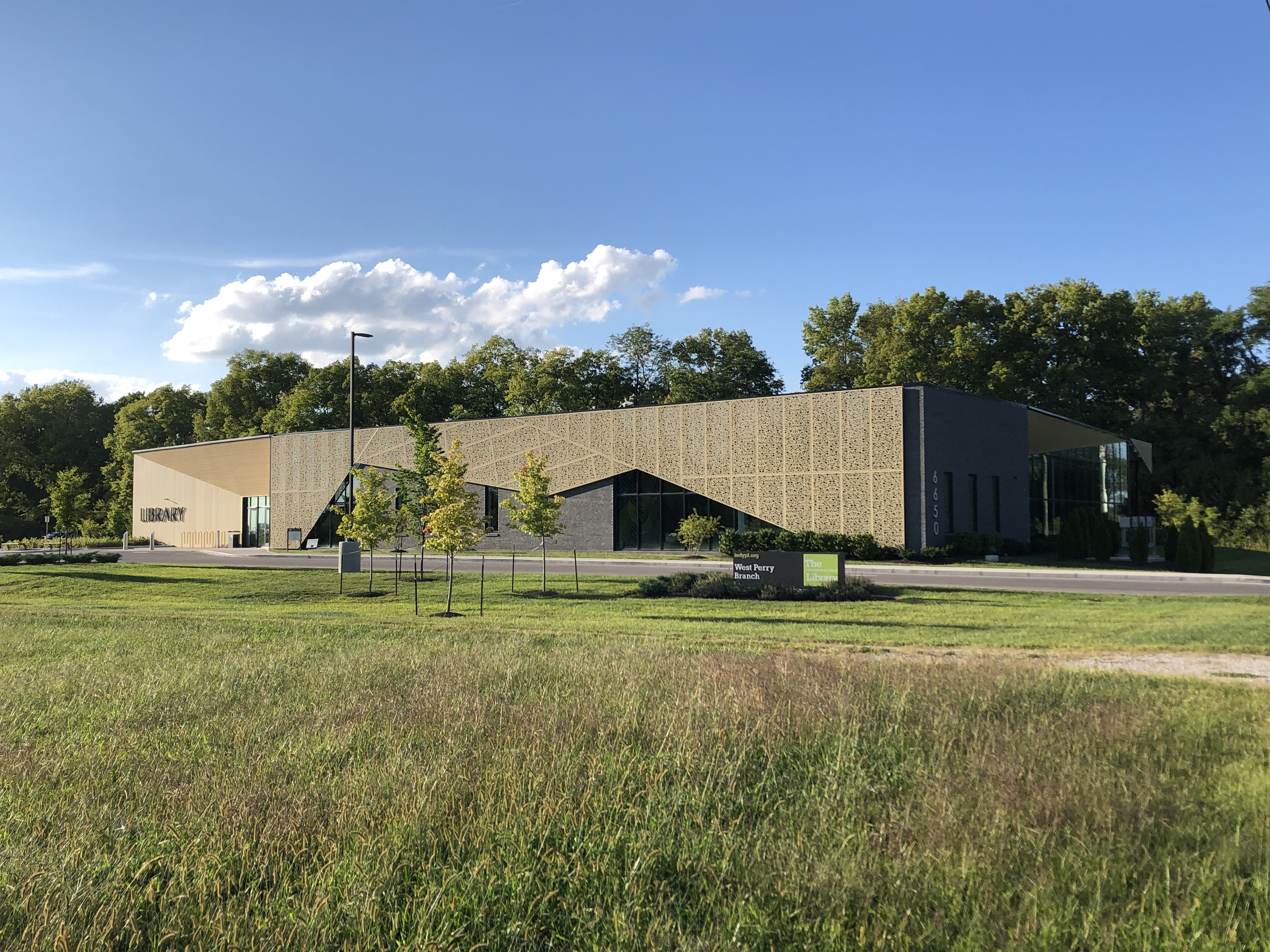
- West Perry branch of the Indianapolis Public Library in 2022

- Seal

- Coordinates: 39°40′54″N 86°8′4″W
- Country: United States
- State: Indiana
- County: Marion
- Named for: Oliver Hazard Perry

Government
  - Type: Indiana township

Area
  - Total: 45.8 sq mi (118.7 km^{2})
  - Land: 45.8 sq mi (118.5 km^{2})
  - Water: 0.077 sq mi (0.2 km^{2})
- Elevation: 735 ft (224 m)

Population (2020)
  - Total: 121,768
  - Density: 2,661/sq mi (1,028/km^{2})
- Time zone: UTC-5 (Eastern (EST))
  - Summer (DST): UTC-4 (EDT)
- FIPS code: 18-59058
- GNIS feature ID: 0453721
- Website: www.perrytownship-in.gov

Perry Township is one of the nine townships of Marion County, Indiana, United States, located in the south central part of the county. It was laid out in 1822 by the U.S. Army Corps of Engineers and named after Oliver Hazard Perry – a War of 1812 hero. The township population was 121,768 at the 2020 census, up from 108,972 at 2010. This includes the largest community of Burmese-Americans in the United States, numbering over 24,000. Through the White River, Perry and Decatur townships share the only water boundary among Marion County's townships.

== Demographics ==
Perry Township, Marion County, Indiana – Racial and ethnic composition Note: the US Census treats Hispanic/Latino as an ethnic category. This table excludes Latinos from the racial categories and assigns them to a separate category. Hispanics/Latinos may be of any race.
Race / Ethnicity (NH = Non-Hispanic)	Pop 2000	Pop 2010	Pop 2020	% 2000	% 2010	% 2020
White alone (NH)	86,747	89,855	77,388	93.44%	82.46%	63.55%
Black or African American alone (NH)	1522	4080	8075	1.64%	3.74%	6.63%
Native American or Alaska Native alone (NH)	150	240	191	0.16%	0.22%	0.16%
Asian alone (NH)	991	4,854	19,978	1.07%	4.45%	16.41%
Native Hawaiian or Pacific Islander alone (NH)	24	44	65	0.03%	0.04%	0.05%
Other race alone (NH)	97	186	525	0.10%	0.17%	0.43%
Mixed race or Multiracial (NH)	807	1,964	4,937	0.87%	1.80%	4.05%
Hispanic or Latino (any race)	2,500	7,749	10,609	2.69%	7.11%	8.71%
Total	92,838	108,972	121,768	100.00%	100.00%	100.00%

Historical population
Census	Pop.	Note	%±
1880	388		—
1890	324		−16.5%
1900	285		−12.0%
1910	352		23.5%
1920	458		30.1%
1930	521		13.8%
1940	549		5.4%
1950	730		33.0%
1960	892		22.2%
1970	2,342		162.6%
1980	2,266		−3.2%
1990	1,969		−13.1%
2000	1,852		−5.9%
2010	1,712		−7.6%
2020	2,123		24.0%
U.S. Decennial Census

Historical population
Census	Pop.	Note	%±
1890	2,448		—
1900	2,825		15.4%
1910	4,091		44.8%
1920	6,228		52.2%
1930	12,877		106.8%
1940	15,963		24.0%
1950	24,947		56.3%
1960	46,555		86.6%
1970	73,735		58.4%
1980	78,485		6.4%
1990	85,060		8.4%
2000	92,838		9.1%
2010	108,972		17.4%
2020	121,768		11.7%
Source: US Decennial Census

== Geography ==
=== Municipalities ===
- Beech Grove (southwest third)
- Homecroft
- Indianapolis (partial)
- Southport

=== Neighborhoods ===
- Meridian Woods Park
- University Heights

== Education ==
Schools in Perry Township include Roncalli, Perry Meridian and Southport high schools. Public K-12 education is provided by the Metropolitan School District of Perry Township.
