= Emerson Heights Historic District =

Historic district in Indiana, United States

- U.S. National Register of Historic Places
- U.S. Historic district
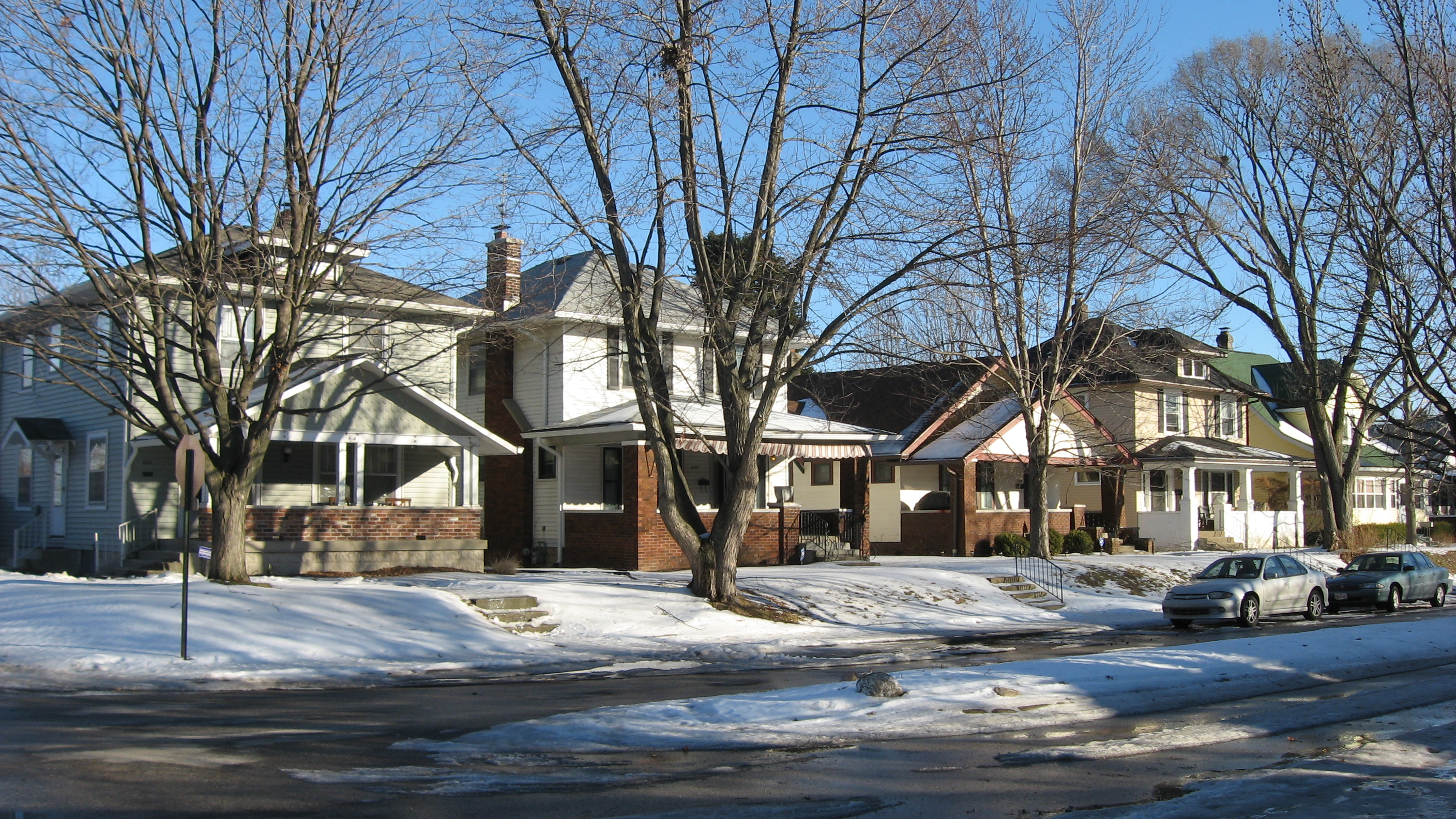
- Emerson Heights Historic District, February 2011

- Location within Indianapolis Location within Indiana Location within the United States
- Location: Roughly bounded by Emerson Ave., Linwood Ave., E. 10th and E. Michigan Sts., Indianapolis, Indiana
- Coordinates: 39°46′40″N 86°05′17″W
- Area: 143 acres (58 ha)
- Built: 1910
- Built by: Sears, Roebuck & Co.; et al.
- Architectural style: Late 19th And 20th Century Revivals, Bungalow/craftsman
- MPS: Historic Residential Suburbs in the United States, 1830-1960 MPS
- NRHP reference No.: 10000125
- Added to NRHP: March 31, 2010

Emerson Heights Historic District, also known as Emerson Heights Addition and Chas. M. Cross Trust Clifford Avenue Addition, is a national historic district located at Indianapolis, Indiana. The district encompasses 1,000 contributing buildings and 9 contributing structures in a predominantly residential section of Indianapolis. They include 659 houses, 334 garages, 7 commercial buildings, and 9 objects. It was developed between about 1910 and 1940, and includes representative examples of Colonial Revival, Tudor Revival, and Bungalow / American Craftsman style architecture. The houses are characteristically of frame construction with brick front porches, with some brick dwellings.

It was listed on the National Register of Historic Places in 2010.

== See also ==
- List of neighborhoods in Indianapolis
- National Register of Historic Places listings in Center Township, Marion County, Indiana
