= Ravenswood, Indianapolis =

Neighborhood in Indianapolis, Indiana, US

Coordinates: 39°53′24″N 86°07′54″W

Ravenswood is a neighborhood in Indianapolis, Indiana, United States. It is located on the city's north side, between 71st and 75th streets, Keystone Avenue, and the White River.

In the early 20th century, Ravenswood was a lively resort area with few permanent residents. In the mid-1940s, the local Volunteer Fire Department had an annual fish fry and weekly movies on the beach. Flooding is a continual problem for the neighborhood.

== See also ==
- List of neighborhoods in Indianapolis
