= Perry Meridian High School =

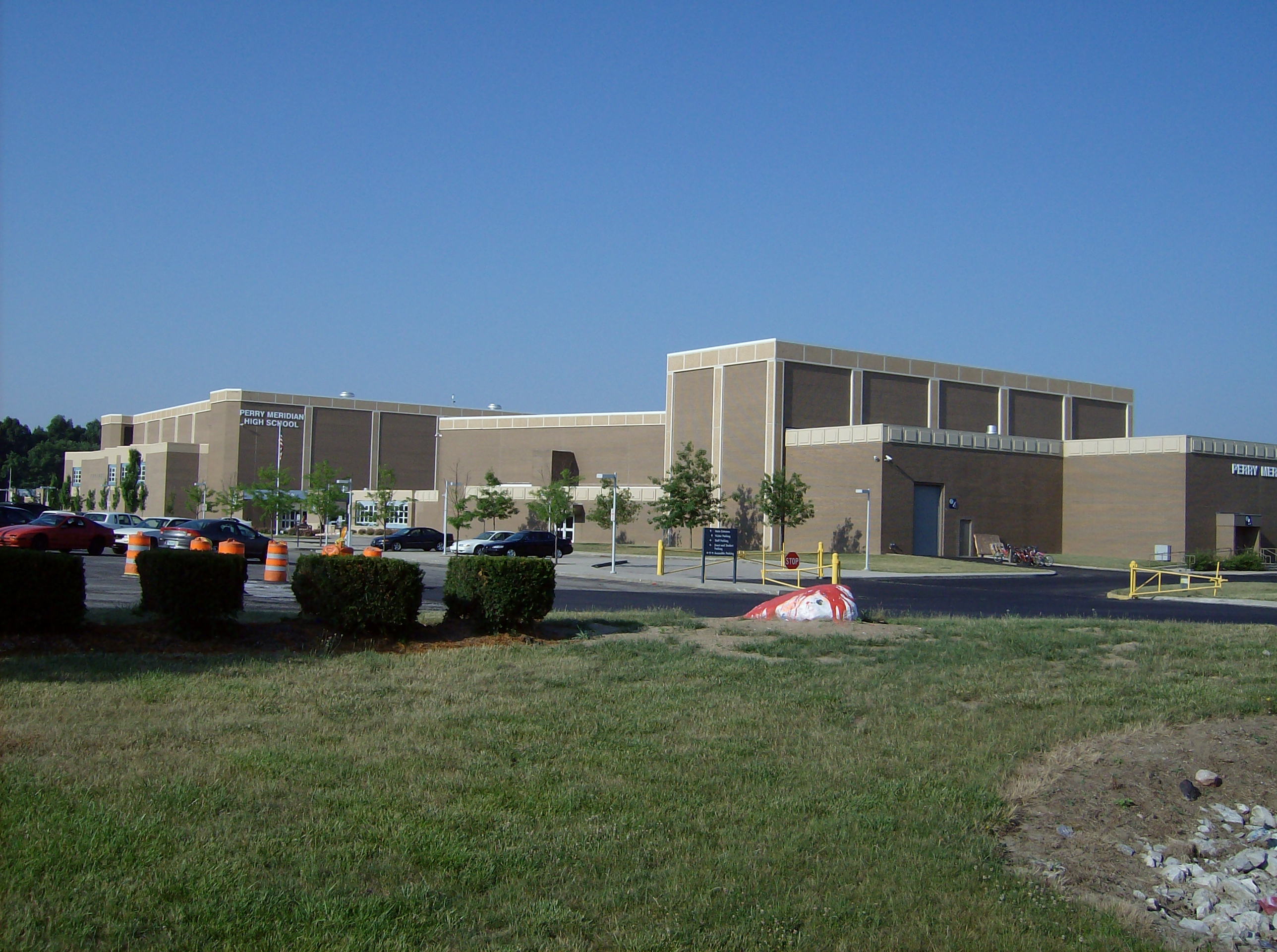

Location
- 401 West Meridian School Road; Indianapolis, Marion County, Indiana 46217; United States; 39°38′52″N 86°09′58″W

Information
- Type: Public high school
- Established: 1972
- NCES School ID: 180882001464
- Principal: Kert Boedicker
- Teaching staff: 129.33 (on an FTE basis)
- Grades: 9–12
- Enrollment: 2,373 (2023-24)
- Student to teacher ratio: 18.35
- Color
- Athletics conference: Mid-State Conference
- Team name: Falcons
- Rival: Southport High School
- Website: PMHS

Perry Meridian High School is a high school in Indianapolis, Indiana. It is one of two public high schools serving grades nine through twelve in the Perry Township, along with Southport High School. Enrollment surpassed 2,350 students during the 2019–2020 school year, with Asian, African-American, Hispanic and multi-racial students making up a slight majority of the high school population. More than 20,000 Burmese (Chin) refugees and extended family members have moved to the Southside since 2000, boosting Perry Meridian's Asian-American population above 25 percent overall by 201

Perry Meridian High School is part of Perry Township Schools.

The school colors are Navy Blue, Powder Blue and Silver. The school mascot is the Falcon.

== History ==
Perry Meridian opened its doors in the fall of 1973 under principal James Head. Students and teachers came from Southport High School, which had been the only high school in Perry Township. Perry Meridian only enrolled grades 9-11 during its first year. Southport students picked the school colors and mascot for Perry during the 1972–73 school year.

== Notable alumni ==
- Russ Bertram – National Championship diver for Indiana University and dive coach for Arizona State from 2006 to 2013 and at Denison University after 2013.
- Katie Douglas – professional basketball player
- Holli Hyche – American sprinter
- Mike Neu – former head football coach at Ball State University
- Andre Owens – professional basketball player
- Blair St. Clair – drag queen
- Dylan Windler – basketball player (Los Angeles Lakers)

== See also ==
- List of schools in Indianapolis
- List of high schools in Indiana
