= Indianapolis Old Southside Historic District =

Historic district in Indianapolis, Indiana, US

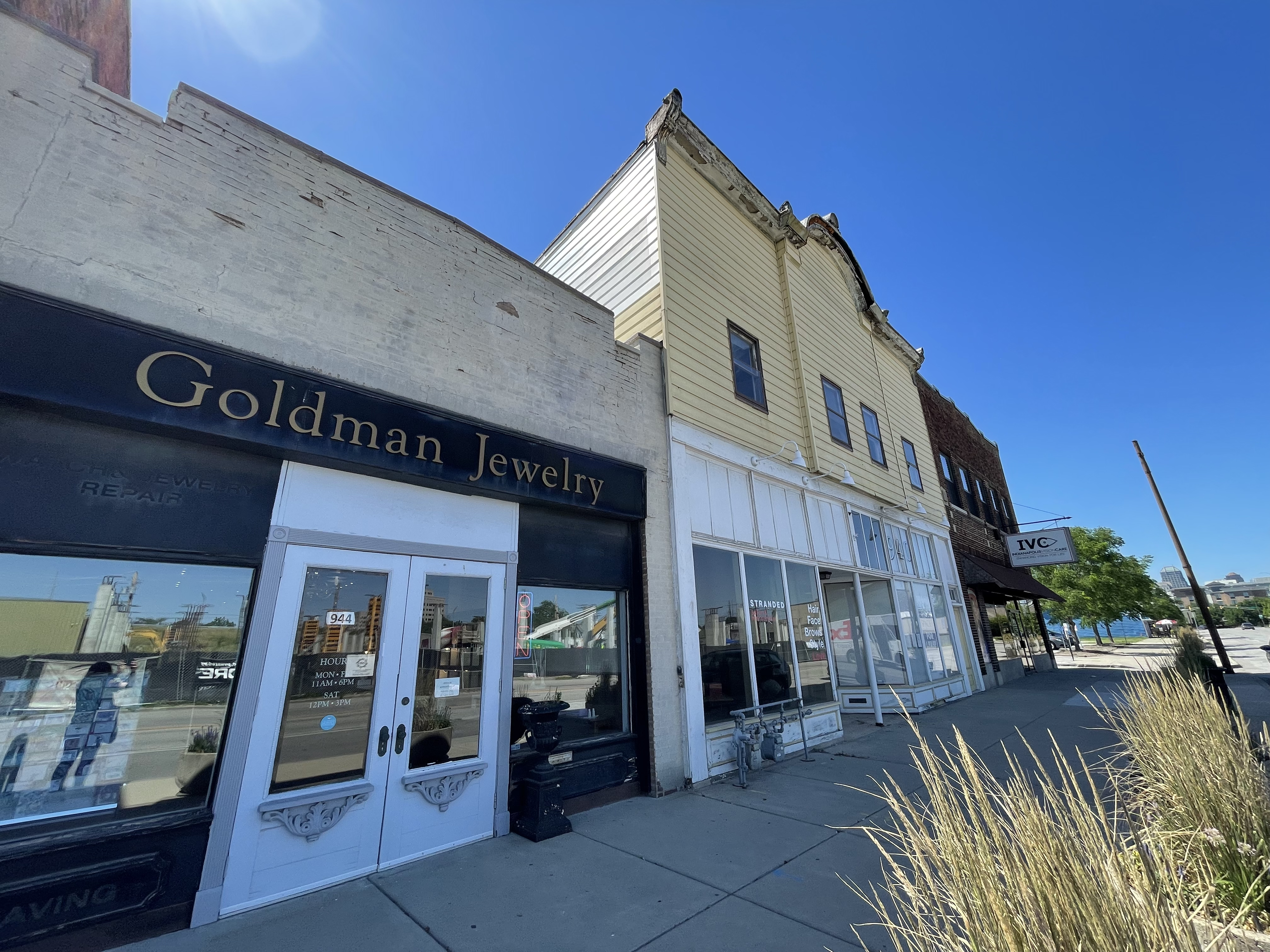
Businesses on Meridian Street in the Old Southside in 2022.

The Indianapolis Historic Old Southside is an historic neighborhood on just south of downtown Indianapolis, Indiana. It is bounded on the north by South Street, on the south by the CSX Railroad and Adler Street, on the east by Madison Avenue, and on the west by the White River.

== History ==
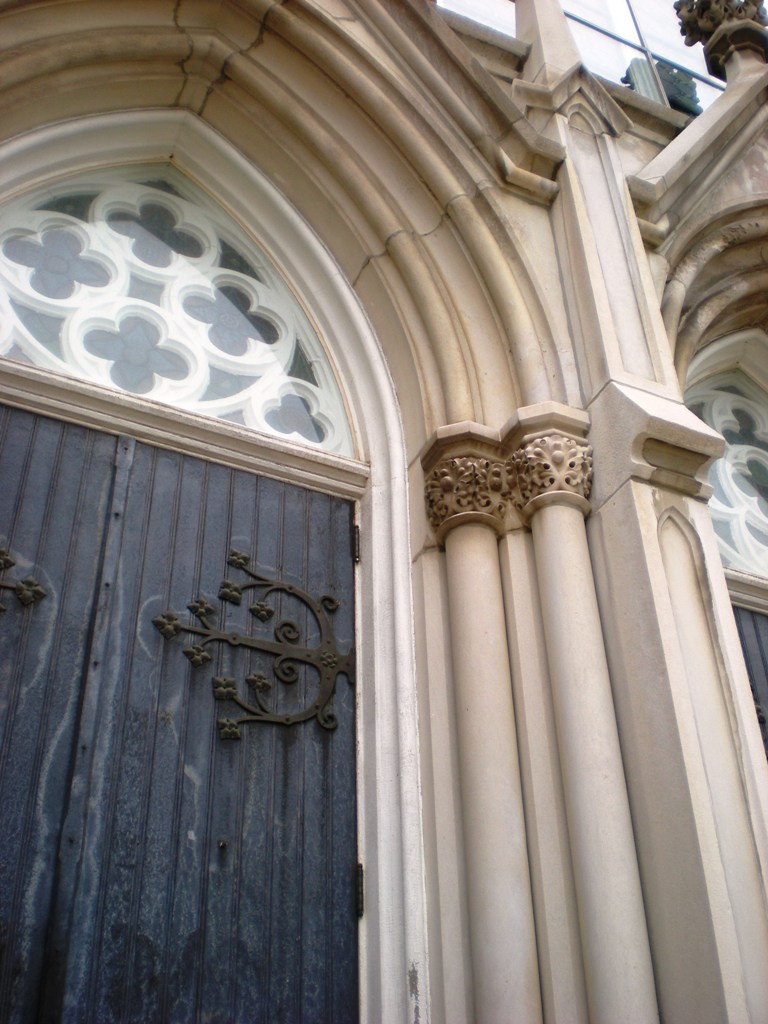
Entrance of Sacred Heart Catholic Church

By the early 1830s Irish and Germans arrived as builders of the Central Canal and workers on the National Road. Many of the early immigrants were of the Roman Catholic and Jewish faiths. St. John's was the first Catholic church built in the mid-1850s, followed by St. Mary's. However the need was growing for another church, so in 1875 nine lots were purchased on the northwest corner of Union and Palmer streets for Sacred Heart Catholic Church. This was a rural location with farmland north of Palmer and extending east to Madison Gravel Road.

An influx of African Americans into Indianapolis by the hundreds took place between the 1840s and 1850s. They settled on the south side and by 1875, South Calvary Baptist Church was erected for the spiritual encouragement and assistance with social and economic issues.

The influx of Jewish citizens into Indianapolis created a need for organizations designed to help them settle into their new urban homes. In 1856, the first Jewish congregation, the Indianapolis Hebrew Congregation, was organized. In 1914, the Jewish Federation built a settlement house on the Southside on Morris Street.

By 1890 Indianapolis' near south side was densely populated and had the highest percentage of foreign-born residents of any district in the city.

== See also ==
- List of neighborhoods in Indianapolis
- National Register of Historic Places listings in Center Township, Marion County, Indiana
