= Rocky Ripple, Indiana =

- Town
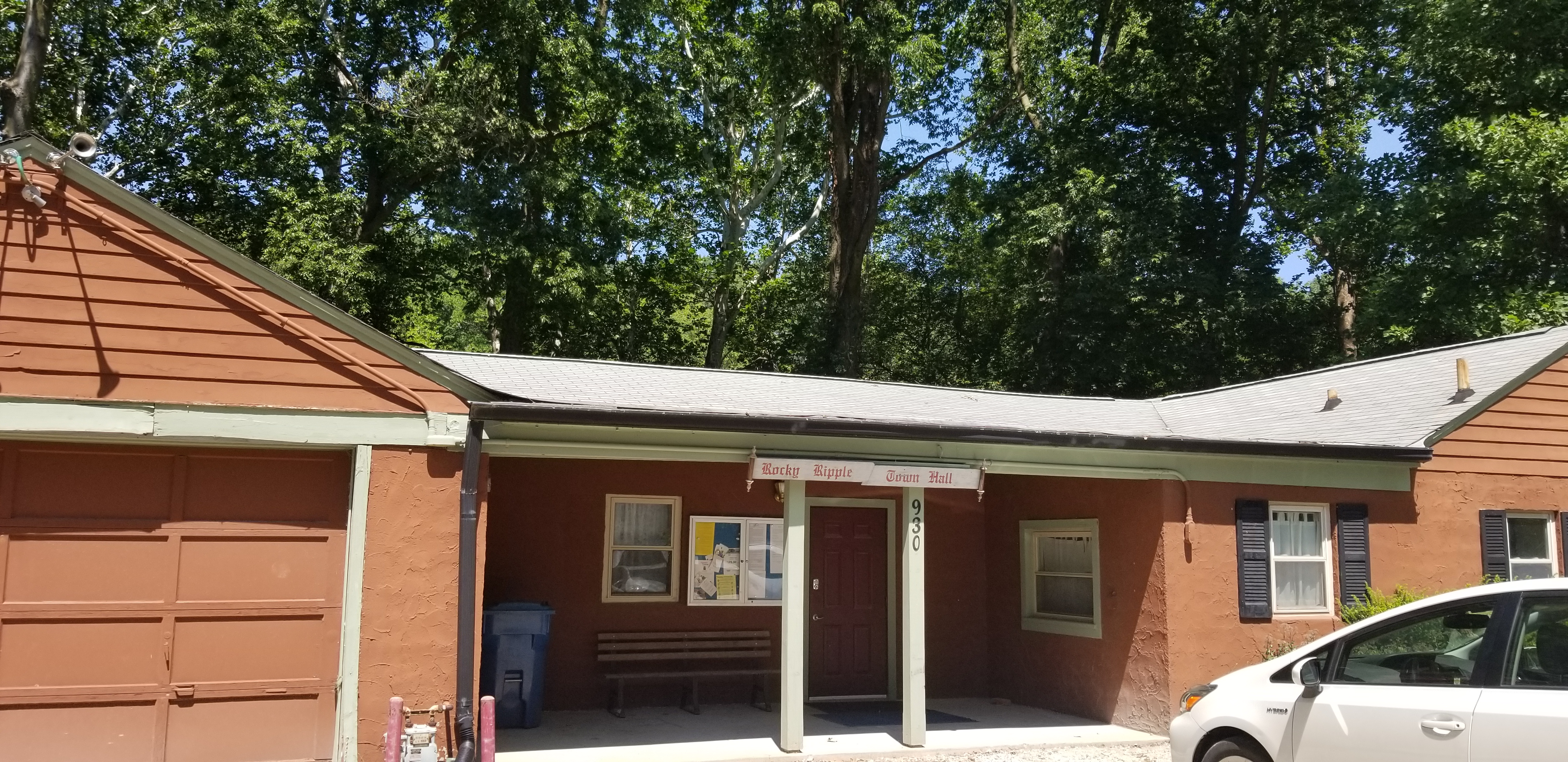

- Logo

- Location in Marion County, Indiana
- Coordinates: 39°50′54″N 86°10′23″W
- Country: United States
- State: Indiana
- County: Marion
- Township: Washington
- Founded: 1927

Area
  - Total: 0.30 sq mi (0.78 km^{2})
  - Land: 0.30 sq mi (0.78 km^{2})
  - Water: 0 sq mi (0.00 km^{2})
- Elevation: 705 ft (215 m)

Population (2020)
  - Total: 655
  - Density: 2,162.5/sq mi (834.94/km^{2})
- Time zone: UTC-5 (Eastern (EST))
  - Summer (DST): UTC-4 (EDT)
- ZIP code: 46208
- Area codes: 317/463
- FIPS code: 18-65556
- GNIS feature ID: 2396887
- Website: rockyripple.com

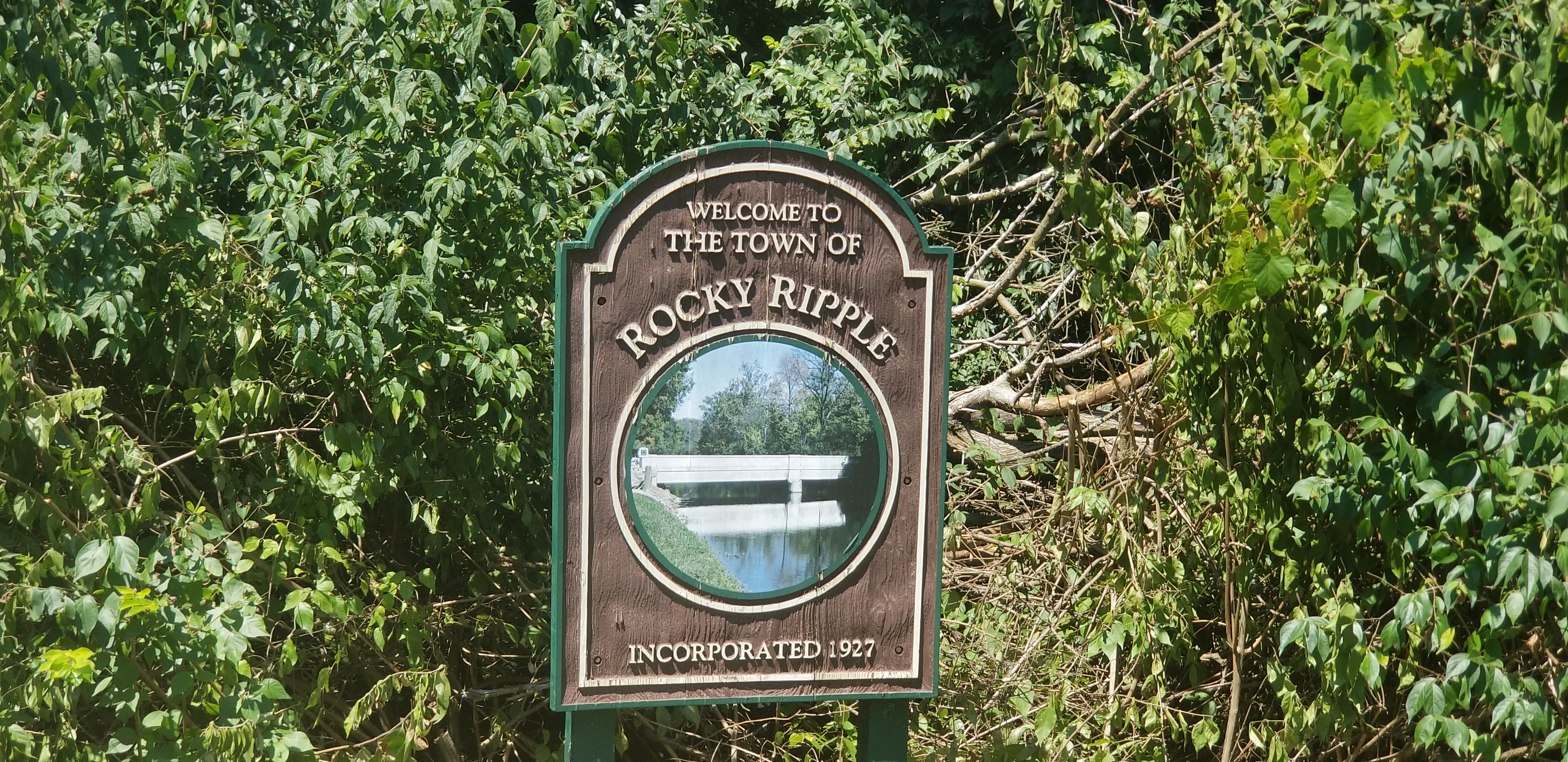
Sign welcoming people to Rocky Ripple

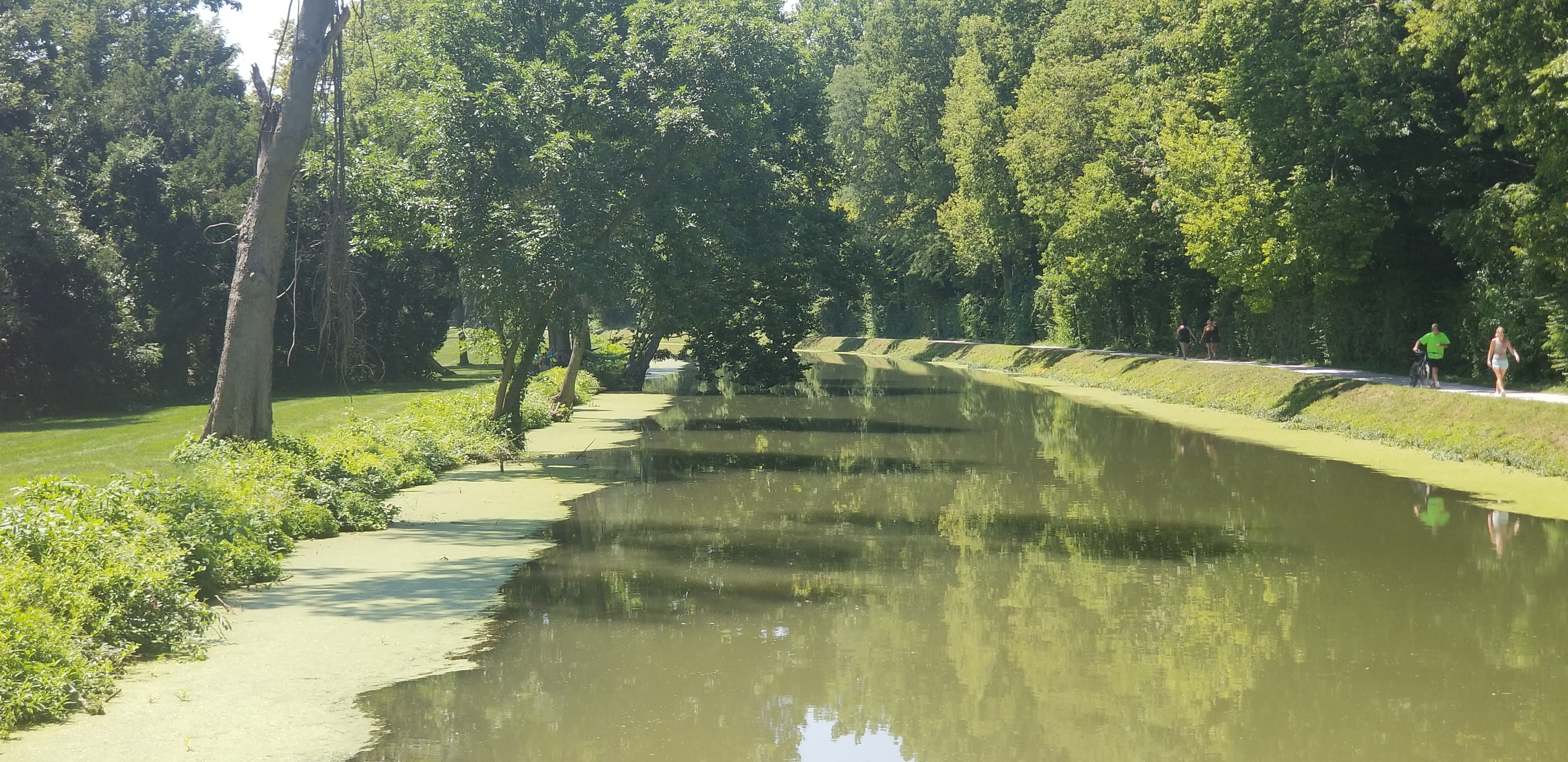
Indiana Central Canal facing south from the 53rd Street bridge in Rocky Ripple

Rocky Ripple is a town in Marion County, Indiana, United States. The population was 655 at the 2020 census. Founded in 1927, the town was incorporated as an "included town" as part of Unigov, the consolidated city-county government of Indianapolis and Marion County, in 1970; it also retains a separate functioning town government under IC 36-3-1-11. Although not far from the Indianapolis city center, Rocky Ripple is a somewhat isolated area, located between the Indiana Central Canal and the White River; only two traffic-supporting bridges over the canal provide access to the town.

== Geography ==
Rocky Ripple is located in northern Marion County. It is bordered to the north and west by the White River and to the southeast by the Indiana Central Canal. To the south it is bordered by athletic fields on the Butler University campus. The town is 6 miles (10 km) north of downtown Indianapolis.

According to the U.S. Census Bureau, Rocky Ripple has a total area of 0.30 square miles (0.78 km^{2}), all land.

The vast majority of Rocky Ripple is located in a floodplain of the White River. A 2017 study found the existing Rocky Ripple levee in seriously deteriorated condition, and estimated a 5% or greater annual chance of it overtopping and a 92% chance that it would be overtopped at least once over the following fifty years.

== Demographics ==
Historical population
Census	Pop.	Note	%±
1930	133		—
1940	315		136.8%
1950	528		67.6%
1960	967		83.1%
1970	1,192		23.3%
1980	778		−34.7%
1990	751		−3.5%
2000	712		−5.2%
2010	606		−14.9%
2020	655		8.1%
U.S. Decennial Census

=== 2010 census ===
As of the census of 2010, there were 606 people, 291 households, and 158 families living in the town. The population density was 2,020.0 inhabitants per square mile (779.9/km^{2}). There were 315 housing units at an average density of 1,050.0 per square mile (405.4/km^{2}). The racial makeup of the town was 89.1% White, 6.1% African American, 0.5% Native American, 0.8% Asian, 1.0% from other races, and 2.5% from two or more races. Hispanic or Latino of any race were 2.5% of the population.

There were 291 households, of which 23.7% had children under the age of 18 living with them, 37.1% were married couples living together, 11.0% had a female householder with no husband present, 6.2% had a male householder with no wife present, and 45.7% were non-families. 36.8% of all households were made up of individuals, and 9% had someone living alone who was 65 years of age or older. The average household size was 2.08 and the average family size was 2.75.

The median age in the town was 40.3 years. 18.2% of residents were under the age of 18; 6.7% were between the ages of 18 and 24; 30.2% were from 25 to 44; 31.2% were from 45 to 64; and 13.7% were 65 years of age or older. The gender makeup of the town was 49.3% male and 50.7% female.

=== 2000 census ===
As of the census of 2000, there were 712 people, 322 households, and 183 families living in the town. The population density was 2,338.5 inhabitants per square mile (902.9/km^{2}). There were 329 housing units at an average density of 1,080.6 per square mile (417.2/km^{2}). The racial makeup of the town was 87.64% White, 9.27% African American, 0.14% Native American, 0.42% Asian, 0.28% from other races, and 2.25% from two or more races. Hispanic or Latino of any race were 1.69% of the population.

There were 322 households, out of which 24.8% had children under the age of 18 living with them, 39.4% were married couples living together, 13.4% had a female householder with no husband present, and 42.9% were non-families. 33.9% of all households were made up of individuals, and 8.7% had someone living alone who was 65 years of age or older. The average household size was 2.21 and the average family size was 2.87.

In the town, the population was spread out, with 20.9% under the age of 18, 5.8% from 18 to 24, 33.0% from 25 to 44, 25.3% from 45 to 64, and 15.0% who were 65 years of age or older. The median age was 40 years. For every 100 females, there were 89.9 males. For every 100 females age 18 and over, there were 87.7 males.

The median income for a household in the town was $144,464, and the median income for a family was $150,500. Males had a median income of $62,500 versus $60,000 for females. The per capita income for the town was $52,691. About 1.1% of families and 2.4% of the population were below the poverty line, including none of those under age 18 and 3.3% of those age 65 or over.

== Education ==
Rocky Ripple is in the Metropolitan School District of Washington Township.

Zoned schools include: Fox Hill Elementary School, Westlane Middle School, and North Central High School (the sole comprehensive high school of the school district).

== Notable events and venues ==
Hohlt Park is near the center of the town, and Wahpihani Park is in the northwest, adjacent to the town hall and the White River.

The town hosts the annual Rocky Ripple Festival, a popular summer event that focuses on the arts and serves as the main fundraiser for the Rocky Ripple Community Association.

== See also ==
- List of cities surrounded by another city
- List of neighborhoods in Indianapolis
