= Bridgeport, Indianapolis =

Neighborhood in Indianapolis, Indiana, US

Bridgeport, Indianapolis, Indiana
- Neighborhood
- Location within Indiana Location within the United States
- Coordinates: 39.732°N 86.317°W
- Country: United States
- State: Indiana
- County: Marion
- Township: Wayne
- Time zone: Eastern (EST)
- ZIP code: 46231
- Area codes: 317 & 463

Bridgeport is a neighborhood located in Indianapolis, Marion County, Indiana. It was previously a small village with a post office and stores, but later became part of Indianapolis.

== History ==
Bridgeport was platted in 1831. It was also called West Parkview and Sunnyside. It was an early African-American community in Marion County. With the passing of Unigov in 1970, Bridgeport, like much of Marion County, was incorporated into Indianapolis.

== Geography ==
Bridgeport is located in Wayne Township near the intersection of Bridgeport Road and Washington Street (US 40).

== Gallery ==
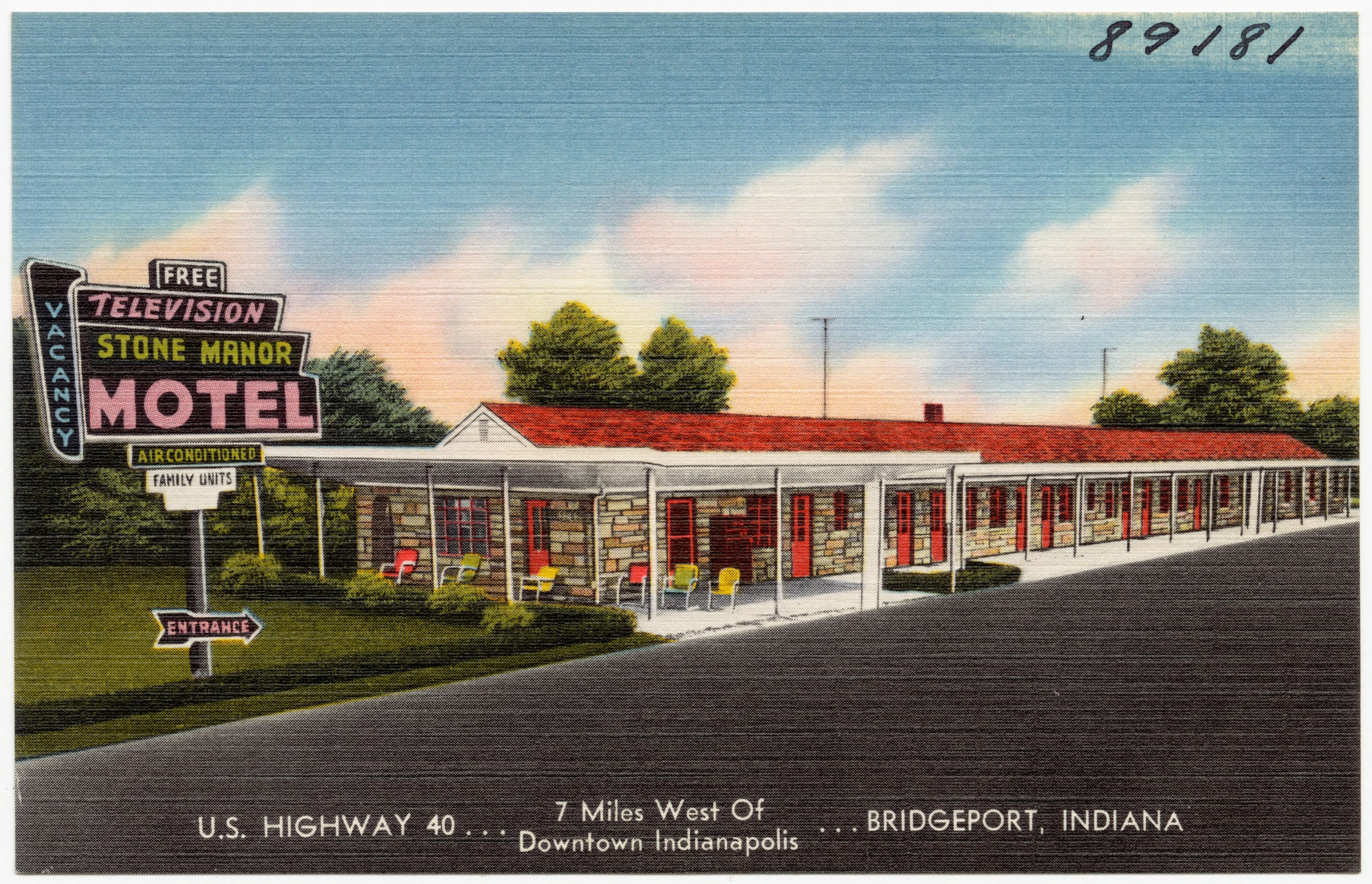
The former Stone Manor Hotel in Bridgeport

== See also ==
- List of African-American neighborhoods
- List of neighborhoods in Indianapolis
