= Southport High School =

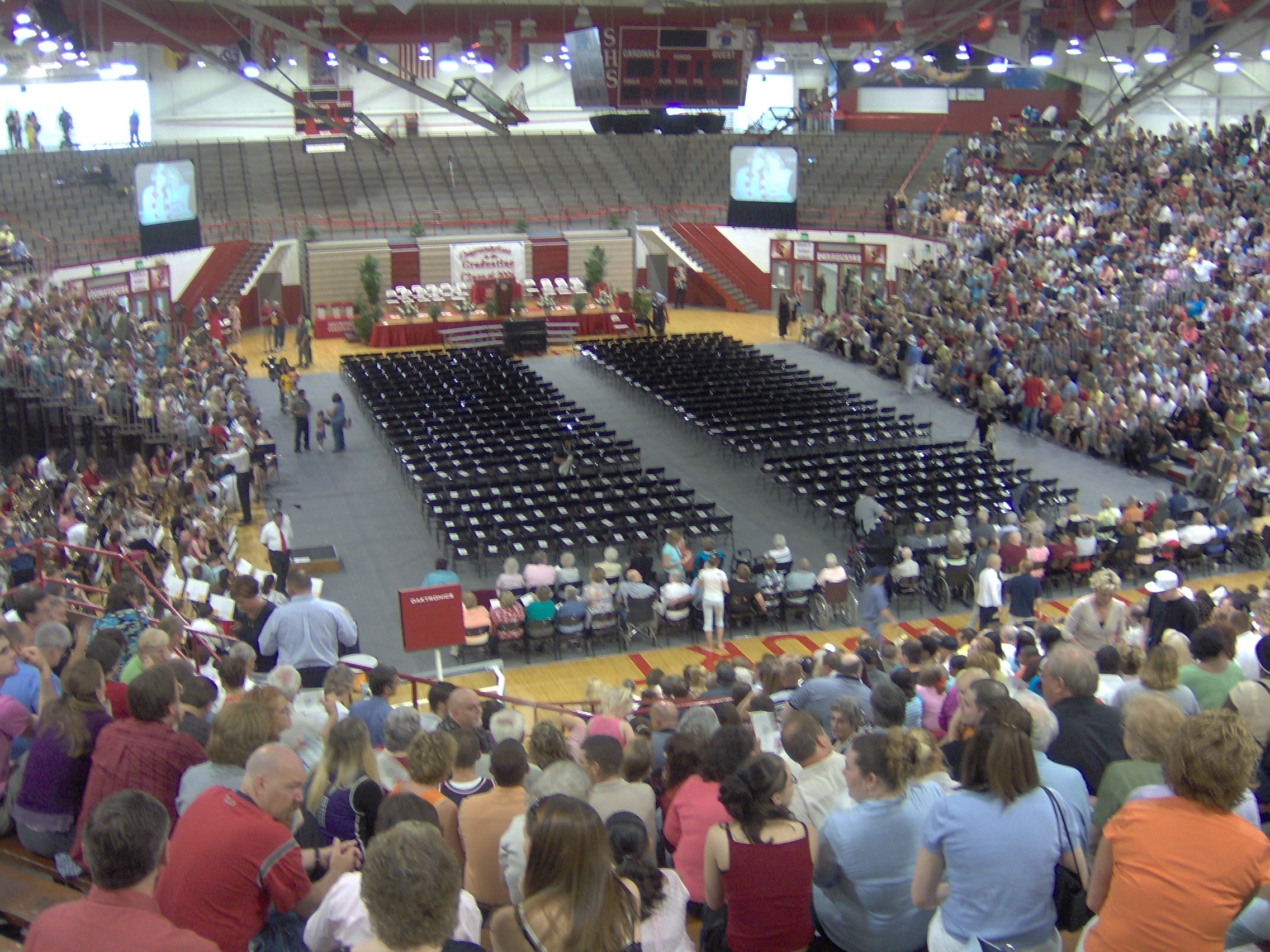

Location
- 971 East Banta Road; Indianapolis, Indiana 46227; United States; 39°40′15″N 86°08′30″W

Information
- Type: Public high school
- Established: 1891
- School district: Perry Township Schools
- NCES School ID: 180882001467
- Principal: Amy Boone
- Teaching staff: 133.50 (on an FTE basis)
- Grades: 9-12
- Enrollment: 2,431 (2024-25)
- Student to teacher ratio: 18.21
- Colors: Cardinal red and white
- Athletics conference: Conference Indiana
- Nickname: Cardinals
- Rival: Perry Meridian High School
- Website: www.perryschools.org/sh/

Southport High School is a public high school located in Indianapolis, Indiana, United States. Located in Perry Township, on the south side of the city, Southport is a part of the Perry Township Schools.

== Demographics ==
The demographic breakdown of the 2,368 students enrolled for 2025-26 was:

- Male - 52.0%
- Female - 48.0%
- Native Hawaiian/Pacific Islander - >0.1%
- Asian - 18.4%
- Black - 14.1%
- Hispanic - 26.9%
- White - 35.6%
- Multiracial - 4.9%

71% of the students were eligible for free or reduced-cost lunch. For 2025–26, Southport was a Title I school.

== Athletics ==
The Southport Cardinals compete in Conference Indiana. The school colors are cardinal red and white. The following Indiana High School Athletic Association (IHSAA) sanctioned sports are offered:

- Baseball (boys)
- Basketball (girls and boys)
  - Girls state champion - 1980
- Cross country (girls and boys)
  - Boys state champion - 1970, 1971, 1975
  - Girls state champion - 1981
- Football (boys)
- Golf (girls and boys)
- Soccer (girls and boys)
- Softball (girls)
- Swimming and diving (girls and boys)
- Tennis (girls and boys)
- Track and field (girls and boys)
- Unified track and field (co-ed)
- Volleyball (girls and boys)
- Wrestling (girls and boys)
  - State champion - 1940, 1951, 1954, 1955, 1964

== Notable alumni ==
- Louie Dampier – National Basketball Association player
- Chuck Klein – Major League Baseball player
- Terry Lester – actor
- Chris Lytle – mixed martial artist
- Robin Miller – motorsports journalist
- Cameron Perkins – Major League Baseball outfielder

== See also ==
- Old Southport High School, NRHP-listed former school building
- List of schools in Indianapolis
- List of high schools in Indiana
