= Eagledale, Indianapolis =

Neighborhood in Indianapolis, Indiana, US

Coordinates: 39°48′46″N 86°14′29″W

Eagledale is a neighborhood on the west side of Indianapolis, Indiana. Eagledale is primarily suburban in nature, consisting of ranch homes built in the 1950s and 1960s by National Homes, which was based out of Lafayette, Indiana. This is one of the few suburban neighborhoods that the city of Indianapolis annexed prior to the 1970 consolidation of city and county governments known as Unigov.

Eagledale is loosely defined as the region bounded to the north by 38th Street, to the west by High School Road, to the south by 25th Street (changed on July 4, 2010, from 30th St so as to include Eagledale Plaza), and to the east by Lafayette Road. The neighborhood includes the former Northwest High School, an Indianapolis Public School.

Eagledale is in close proximity to the Indianapolis Motor Speedway; as a result, it is not uncommon to see cars parked in the yards of homes in this neighborhood on or close to the date that the Indianapolis 500 or Brickyard 400 is being held.

== See also ==
- List of neighborhoods in Indianapolis
