= Eastgate, Indianapolis =

Neighborhood in Indianapolis, Indiana, US

Eastgate is a neighborhood on the east side of Indianapolis located within the I-465 loop, and bounded on the north by E. 16th Street, on the south by E. Washington Street, on the east by Franklin Road, and on the west by Shadeland Avenue. The neighborhood was best known as the site of the Eastgate Shopping Center (later renamed Eastgate Consumer Mall), the first mall in Indiana. In May 2008 the shopping center was sold to Lifeline Data Centers, who turned it into a colocation site. The shopping center has been converted into a data storage center, and also plays host to Indianapolis' Homeland Security Department as of Summer 2010.

The neighborhood is known for its mature trees, many well over 70 years old, and older homes with a diverse variety of architectural styles representative of the 1930s-1950s, when most of the homes were built. Few new constructions took place after 1965. Styles are predominantly bungalow, Cape Cod, and ranch with some Tudor Revival, mid-century modern, and craftsman. The neighborhood was once one of the more fashionable neighborhoods in Indianapolis in the 1960s and 70s due to the Eastgate Shopping Center, and its vicinity to the downtown area and manufacturing jobs. After the closing of several manufacturing plants, many residents were forced to look for work elsewhere and moved out. Current residents are predominantly employed in the professional fields, most with vocational or post-secondary educational degrees. More recently, the revitalization of the adjacent Irvington Historic District has bolstered home values, and increased local interest in the neighborhood.

The Eastgate neighborhood falls under the Metropolitan School District of Warren Township, whose high school has achieved an over 74% progression to post-secondary education, and a 90.1% graduation rate, where the national average graduation rate sits at 78%. The district's high school Warren Central High School is known for its outstanding football program, and has been ranked as high as number 2 in the nation in USA Today's Prep Top 25 poll. Along with this achievement, the school holds an extensive record of State Champion titles in areas such as cross country, track and field, men's gymnastics, speech and debate, theatre arts, wrestling. The school also achieved the rank of 3rd-best athletic program in the nation, and 1st among public schools by Sports Illustrated in 2007.

The neighborhood also plays host to the East Side Voice, an independent newspaper serving the east side of Indianapolis, with an estimated readership of over 25,000, the Ransburg YMCA, the Holy Spirit Catholic Church and School, and the Crossroads Bible College.

== See also ==
- List of neighborhoods in Indianapolis
