= Perry Township Schools =

School district in Marion County, Indiana, US

Address
- 6548 Orinoco Ave Indianapolis, Indiana, 46227; United States
- Coordinates: 39°40′N 86°8′W

District information
- Type: Public
- Grades: PK–12
- Schools: 21
- NCES District ID: 1808820

Students and staff
- Students: 16,243 (2025–2026)
- Teachers: 977.01 (on an FTE basis) (2025–2026)
- Staff: 1,041.00 (on an FTE basis) (2025–2026)
- Student–teacher ratio: 16.63 (2025–2026)

Other information
- Website: www.perryschools.org

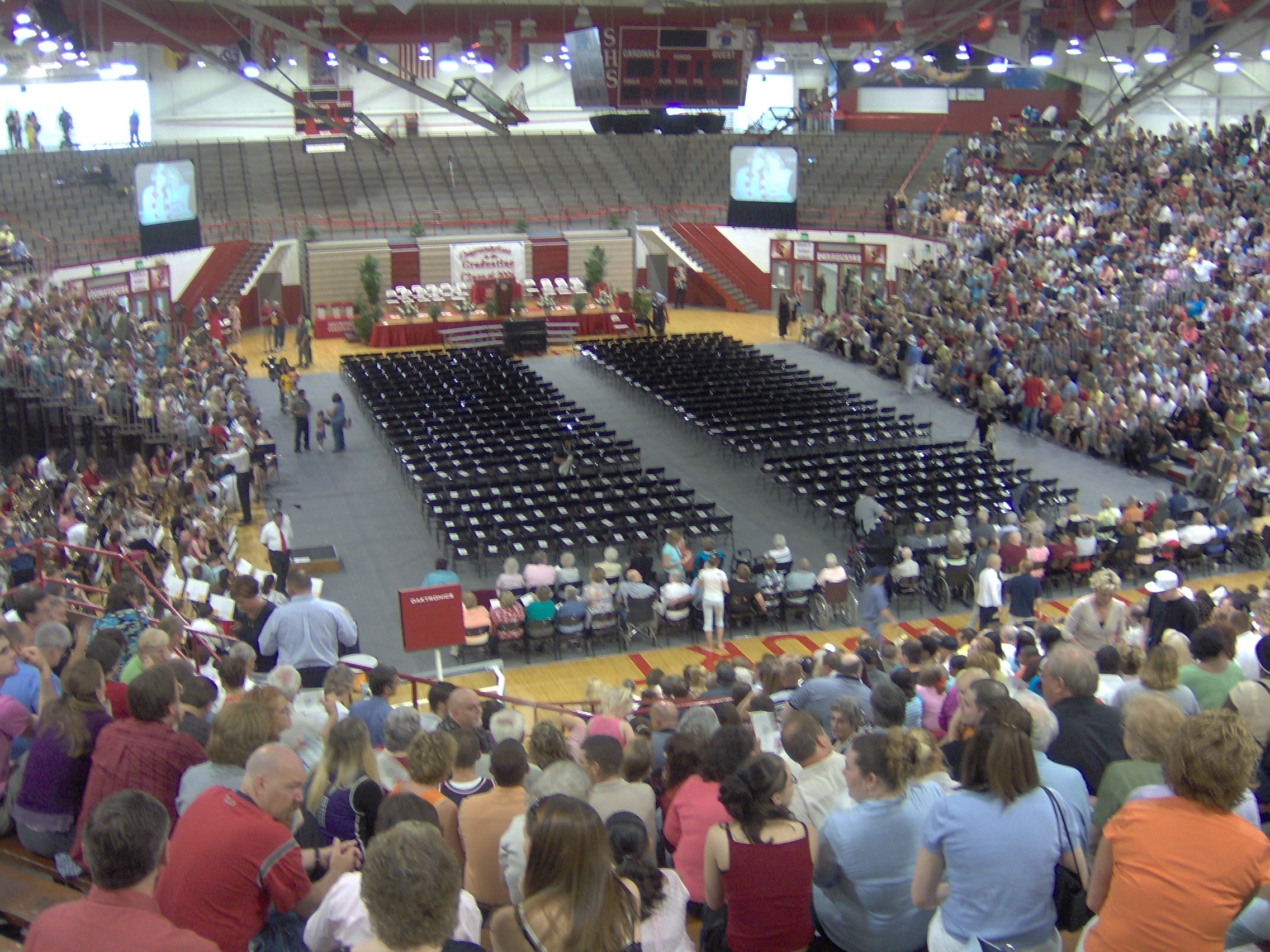
Gymnasium at Southport High School, the older of the two high schools in the district

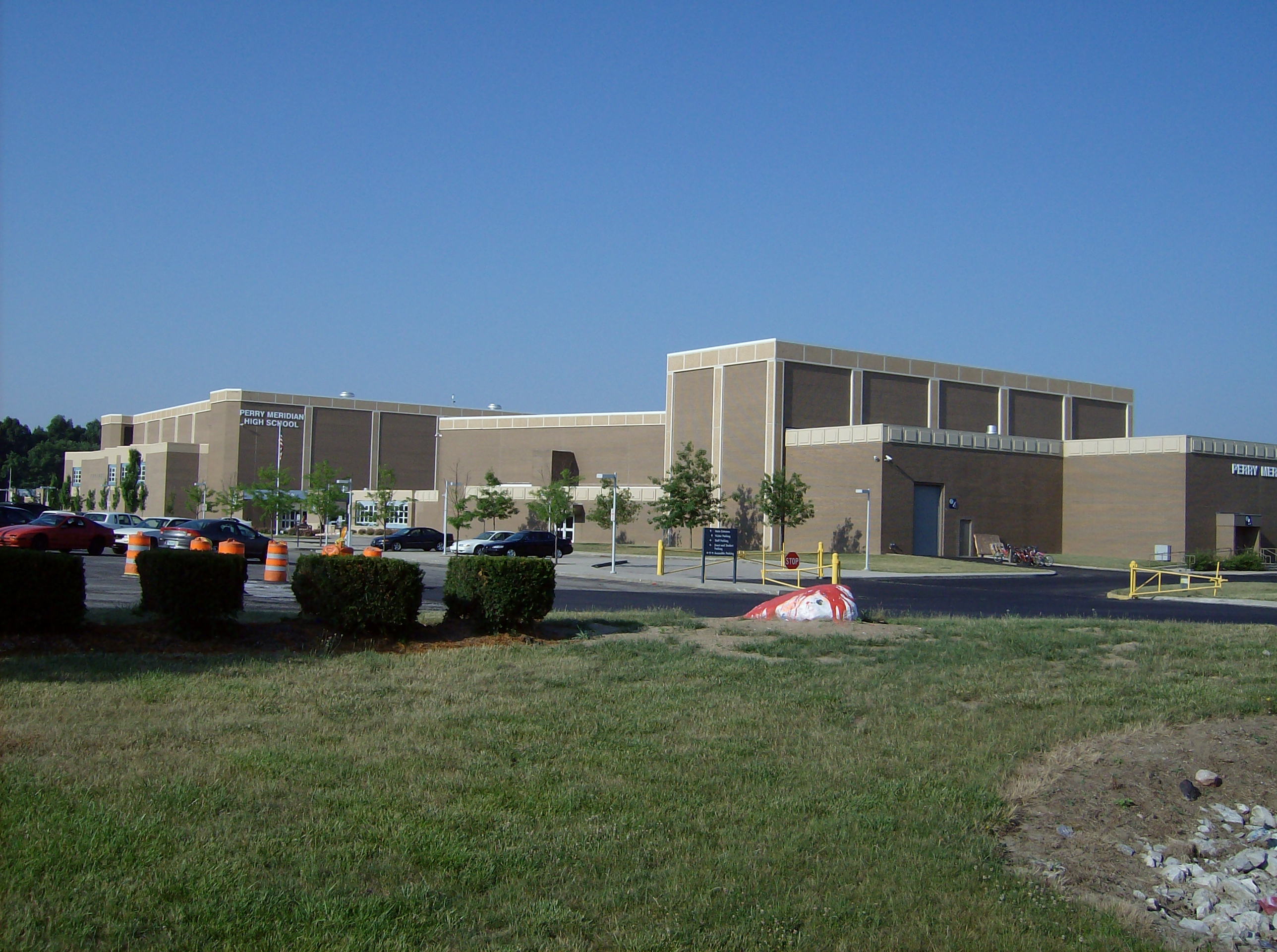
Façade of Perry Meridian High School, the newer of the two high schools in the district

The Perry Township Schools is the public school district serving Perry Township, Marion County, Indiana, United States, a southern part of the city of Indianapolis.

It includes Homecroft and Southport.

== Schools ==
High schools

- Perry Meridian High School
- Southport High School

Middle schools

- Perry 6th Grade Academy
- Perry Meridian Middle
- Southport 6th Grade Academy
- Southport Middle

Elementary schools

- Abraham Lincoln Elementary
- Homecroft Elementary
- Southport Elementary
- Douglas MacArthur Elementary
- Mary Bryan Elementary
- Winchester Village Elementary
- Clinton Young Elementary
- Henry Burkhart Elementary
- Glenns Valley Elementary
- Rosa Parks Elementary
- Jeremiah Gray Elementary

Kindergarten Academies

- Douglas MacArthur Kindergarten Academy
- Homecroft Kindergarten Academy
- Jeremiah Gray Kindergarten Academy
- Rosa Parks Kindergarten Academy

Alternative schools

- James Whitcomb Riley Alternative Education
- Rise Learning Center

== See also ==
- List of school districts in Indiana
