= Metropolitan School District of Warren Township =

School district in Marion County, Indiana, US

Coordinates: 39°46′N 86°0′W

The Metropolitan School District of Warren Township is a school district on the east side of Marion County, Indianapolis, Indiana. In 2005 it had a student enrollment of 11,800, with the total population being 94,525.

It includes Cumberland and Warren Park.

It includes one high school, three intermediate/middle schools, nine elementary schools, one pre-school (The Early Childhood Center), and one alternative school for at-risk students of middle-school and high-school age (The Renaissance School).

The district has achieved an 86% graduation rate and over 74% progression to post-secondary education.

== Schools ==
High school

- Warren Central High School (along with the Walker Career Center)

Middle schools

- Stonybrook Intermediate/Middle School
- Raymond Park Intermediate/Middle School
- Creston Intermediate/Middle School

Elementary schools

- Brookview Elementary School
- Eastridge Elementary School
- Grassy Creek Elementary School
- Hawthorne Elementary School
- Lakeside Elementary School
- Liberty Park Elementary School
- Lowell Elementary School
- Pleasant Run Elementary School
- Sunny Heights Elementary School

== See also ==
- List of school districts in Indiana
