= Nora, Indianapolis =

Neighborhood in Indianapolis, Indiana, US

Nora
- Neighborhood Area of Indianapolis
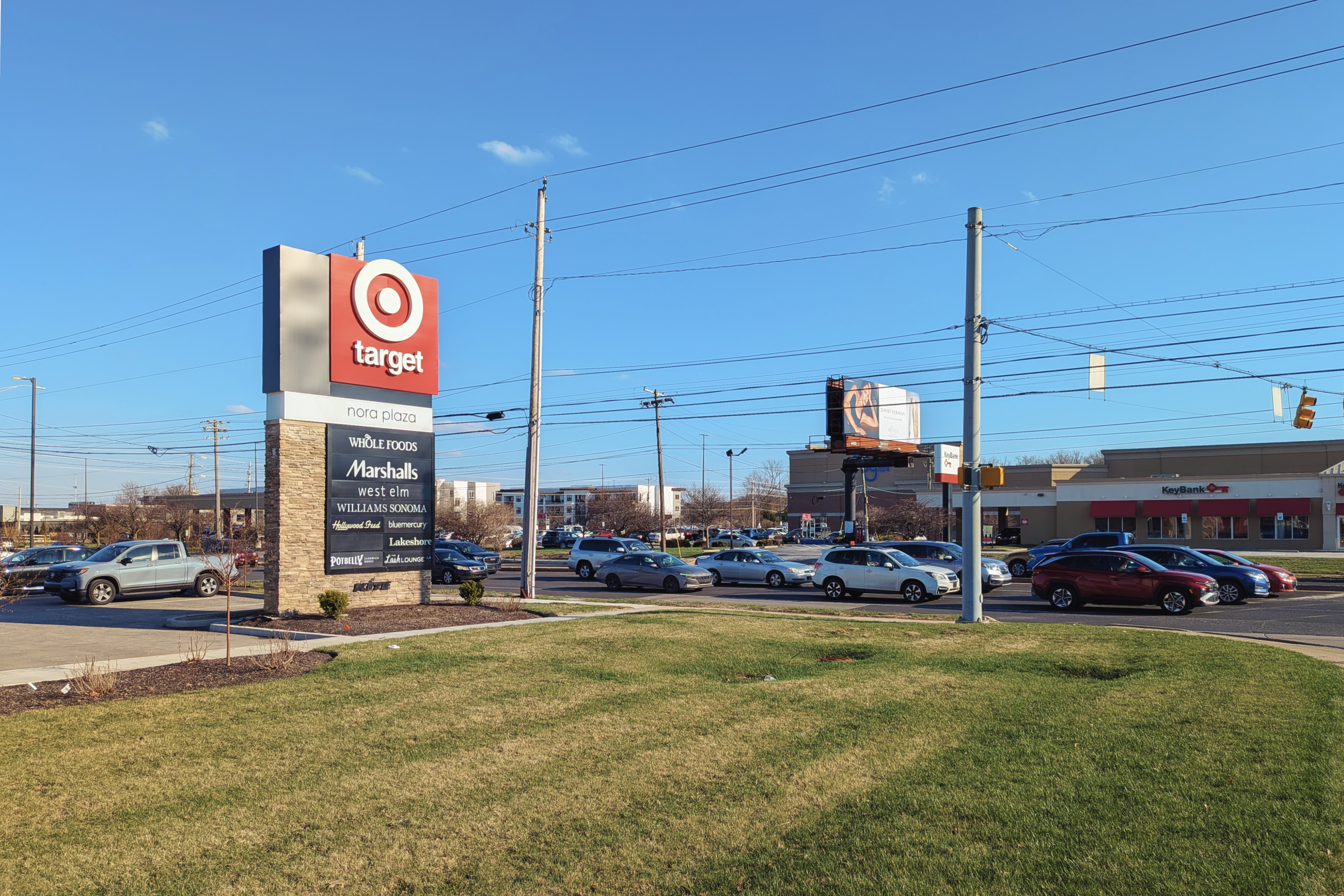
- Nora Plaza commercial area near 86th Street and Evergreen Avenue, 2026

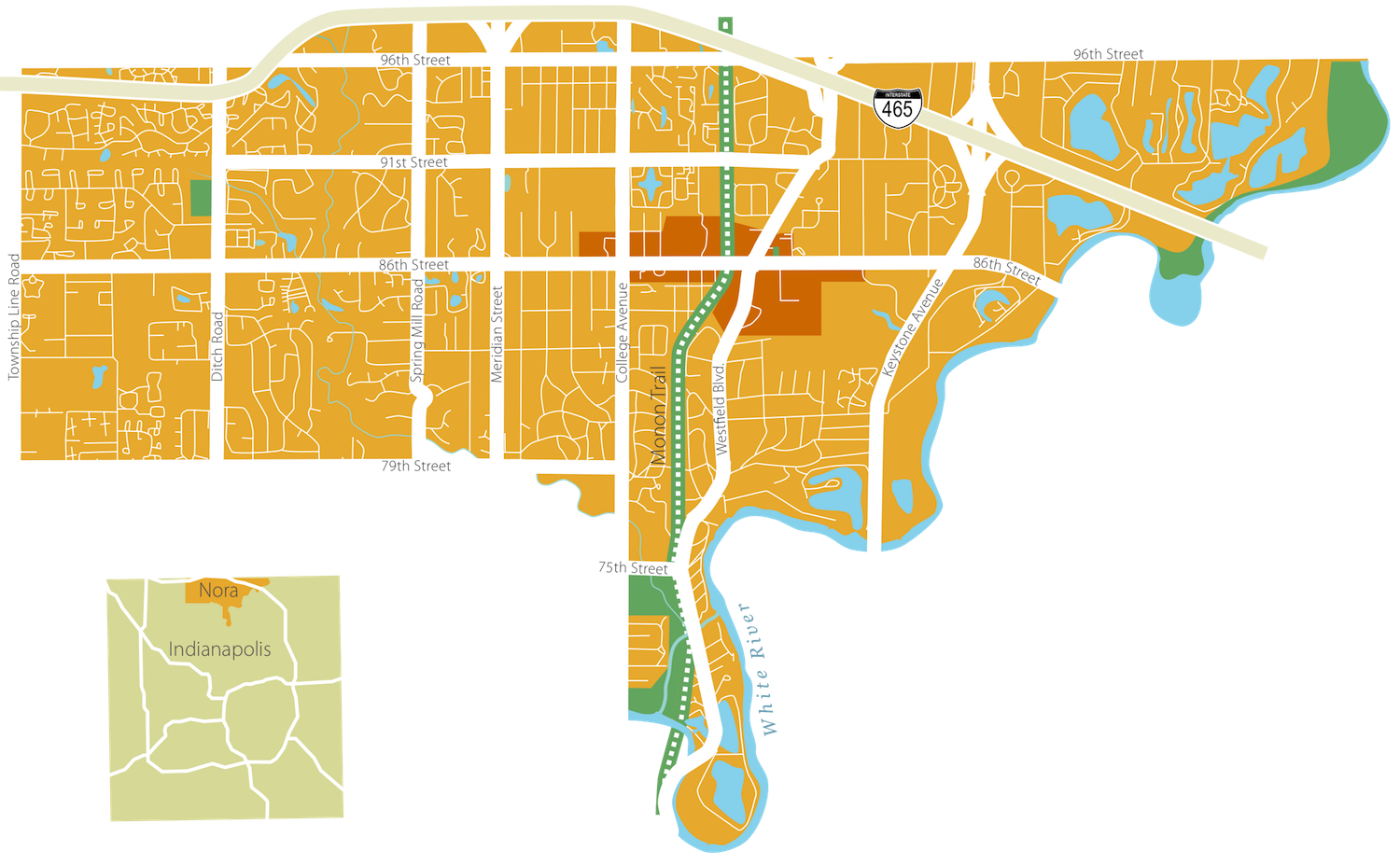
- Map of the Nora neighborhood in Indianapolis
- Coordinates: 39°54′46″N 86°08′21″W
- Country: United States
- State: Indiana
- County: Marion
- Townships: Washington
- City: Indianapolis

Population (2020)
  - Total: 8,314
- Time zone: UTC−5 (EST)
  - Summer (DST): UTC−4 (EDT)
- ZIP codes: 46240, 46260
- Area code: 317 / 463

Nora is a neighborhood area on the far north side of Indianapolis, Indiana, United States. Nora's residential communities typically feature diverse housing stock, large lots, and mature trees.

The commonly accepted community boundaries are those defined by the Nora-Northside Community Council (NCC) – contained by White River on the east (southward around the Broad Ripple oxbow), Williams Creek and 79th Street on the south, Township Line Road on the west, and 96th Street (which forms the border between Marion and Hamilton counties) and I-465 on the north. It contains six distinct commercial districts, including Nora Center, Greenbriar, and The Fashion Mall at Keystone. The Nora-Northside community is situated between Carmel to the north, Broad Ripple and downtown Indianapolis to the south, Castleton to the east, and Pike Township to the west.

Nora was never an incorporated town, so its accepted boundaries have varied. The Nora Center community district is centered at the intersection of West 86th Street and the Monon Trail crossing, anchored by schools, public library, post office, and YMCA. In 2019, the Marion County Land Use Plan defined the boundary of Nora Center and designated it as Village Mixed-Use land use with Town Center overlay topology. The Town Center (TC) overlay is intended for new and historic neighborhood centers. Its purpose is to promote development with a high degree of pedestrian connectivity that has a slightly higher density than the surrounding area.

== History ==
The name Nora for this area can be traced back to December 1871, when Swedish immigrant Peter Lawson was appointed postmaster at Nora. Lawson owned a grocery store situated at what is today the southwest corner of Westfield Boulevard and 86th Street.

Lawson named the area after his home parish in Sweden. He was born as Per Israelsson on March 29, 1828, in Blexbergstorp, Nora parish, Örebro County Sweden. He emigrated in 1854 and from at least 1860 he is known to have lived in Washington Township, Marion County. In 1861 he was one of the founding members of the Union Church Washington Township. Lawson died on October 29, 1884, and was buried in Crown Hill Cemetery.

The locality of Nora grew around Lawson's grocery store and post office. Soon there were more shops, smithies, and a train station in the area. Nora Elementary School was opened in 1895.

About 150 people lived in Nora in the 1880s, but the area did not become densely populated until the mid-1900s. Nora Plaza Shopping Center was built in 1959, anchored by an Ayr-Way store that became a Target and a Standard that later became a Lowell's No Frills Discount Foods, Wild Oats Market, and most recently Whole Foods. A new post office was opened in 1961 (a Steak 'n Shake was at the old location, but is now closed). Nora Community Council was established in 1967. Nora became part of Indianapolis under Unigov in 1970.

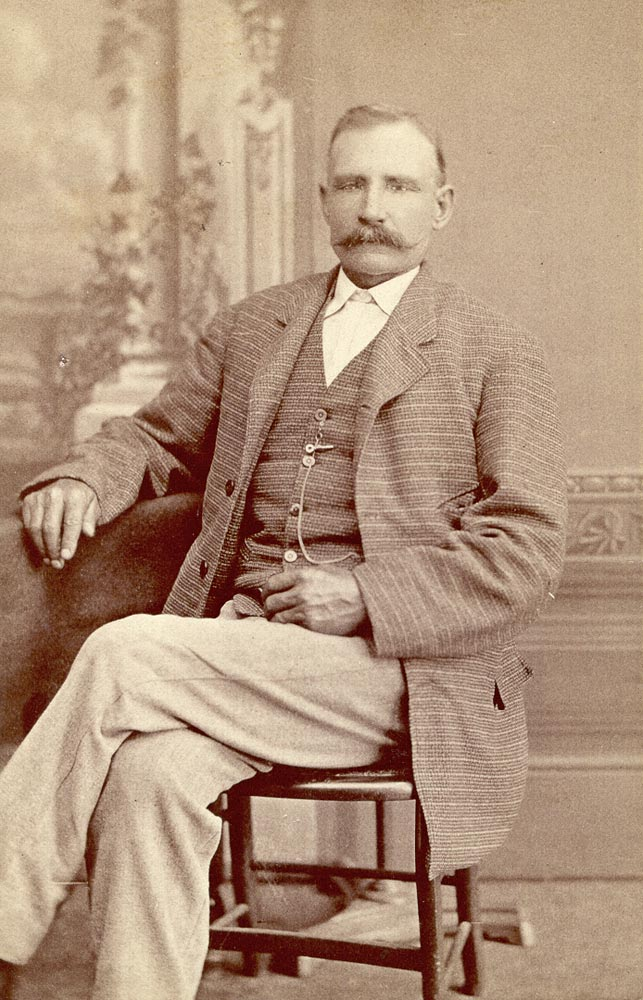
Peter Lawson, the founder of Nora

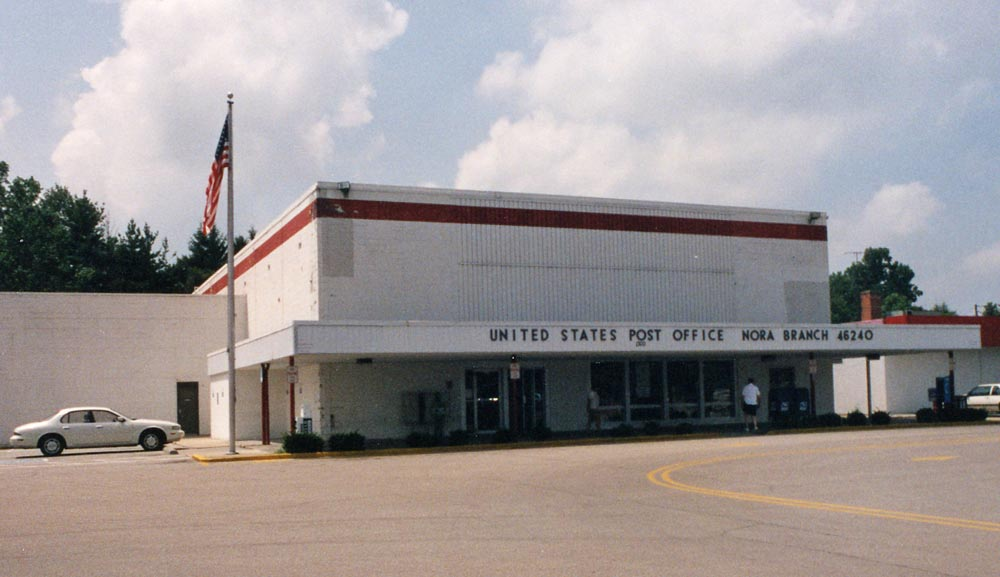
Nora Post Office in 1998 (built as a movie theatre)

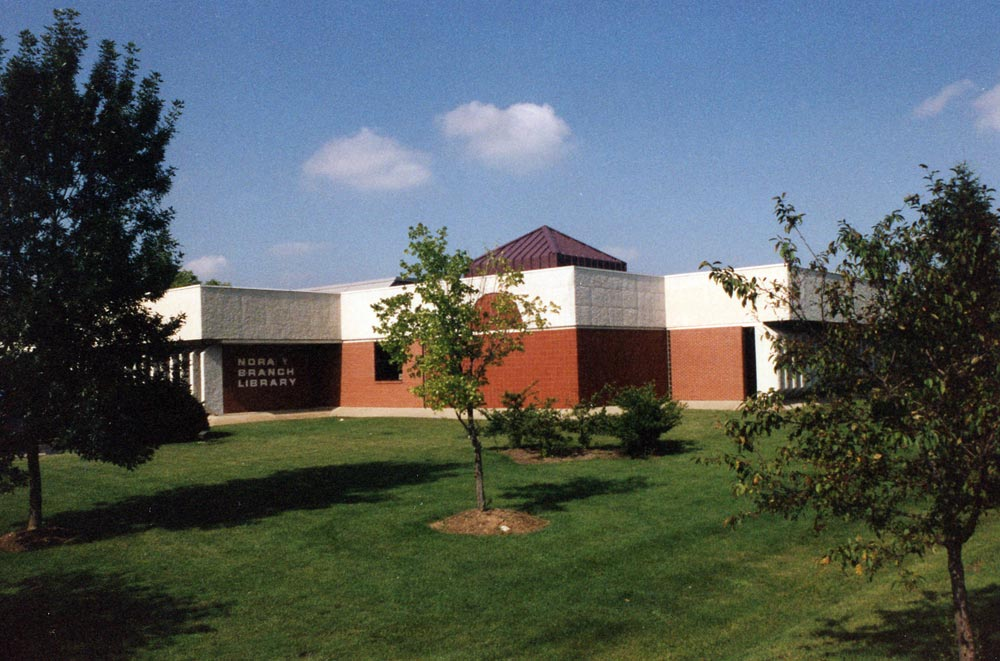
Nora Branch Library in 1998

== Education ==
Nora has a public library, a branch of the Indianapolis Public Library.

Nora is home to North Central High School, Northview Middle School, Nora Elementary School, all of which are part of the Metropolitan School District of Washington Township, The Indiana School for the Blind and Visually Impaired is also located in the neighborhood.

== See also ==
- List of neighborhoods in Indianapolis
