= Williams Creek, Indiana =

- Town
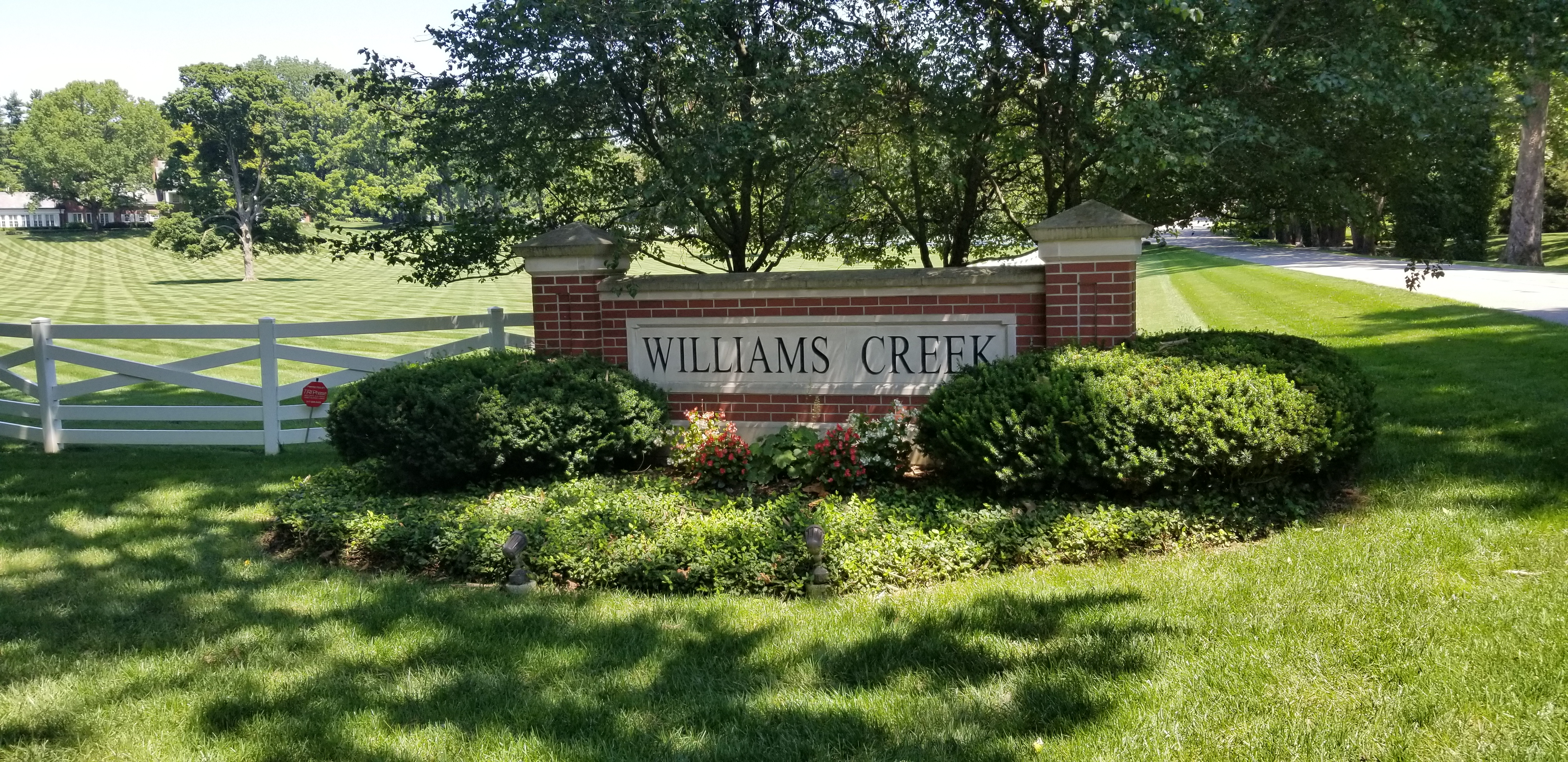

- Logo

- Location in Marion County, Indiana
- Coordinates: 39°54′01″N 86°09′01″W
- Country: United States
- State: Indiana
- County: Marion
- Township: Washington

Government
  - Type: Town Council
  - Town President: Matt Neff
  - Town Clerk-Treasurer: Robert Parrin

Area
  - Total: 0.34 sq mi (0.87 km^{2})
  - Land: 0.34 sq mi (0.87 km^{2})
  - Water: 0 sq mi (0.00 km^{2})
- Elevation: 781 ft (238 m)

Population (2020)
  - Total: 430
  - Density: 1,285.7/sq mi (496.42/km^{2})
- Time zone: UTC-5 (Eastern (EST))
  - Summer (DST): UTC-4 (EDT)
- ZIP code: 46240
- Area codes: 317 and 463
- FIPS code: 18-84374
- GNIS feature ID: 2397745
- Website: williamscreek.org

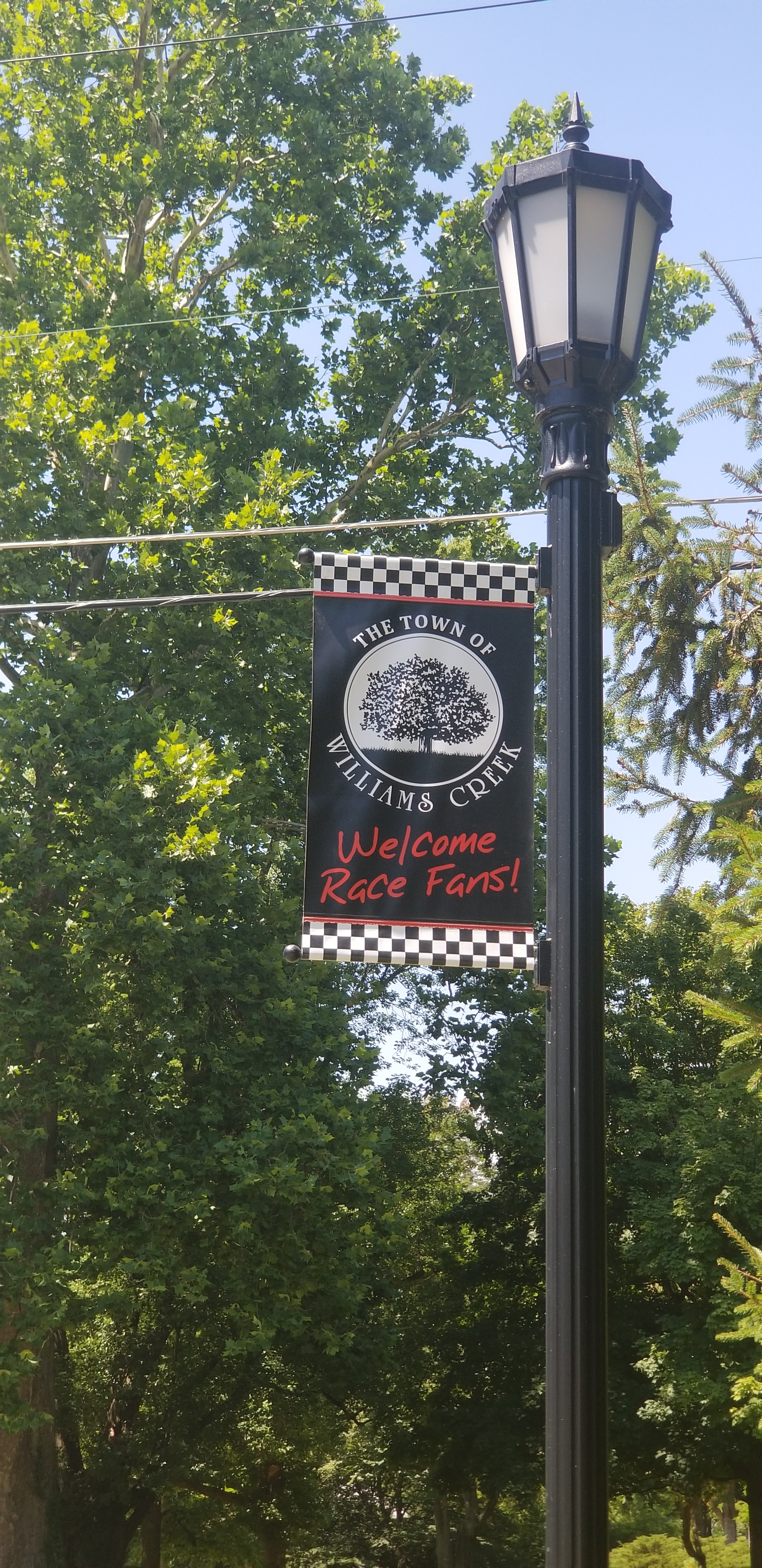
A sign welcoming race fans to Williams Creek

Williams Creek is a town in Washington Township, Marion County, Indiana, United States. It is located about 9 miles (14 km) north of downtown Indianapolis. The population was 430 at the 2020 census. It has existed as an "included town" since 1970, when it was incorporated into Indianapolis as part of Unigov. It is part of Indianapolis, but retains a functioning town government under IC 36-3-1-11.

== History ==
Williams Creek was originally planned as an exclusive community for the wealthy in 1925, and it was incorporated as a town in 1932. The town was the home of American writer Kurt Vonnegut's parents when he wrote a letter home from Europe after surviving the bombing of Dresden as a POW.

== Geography ==
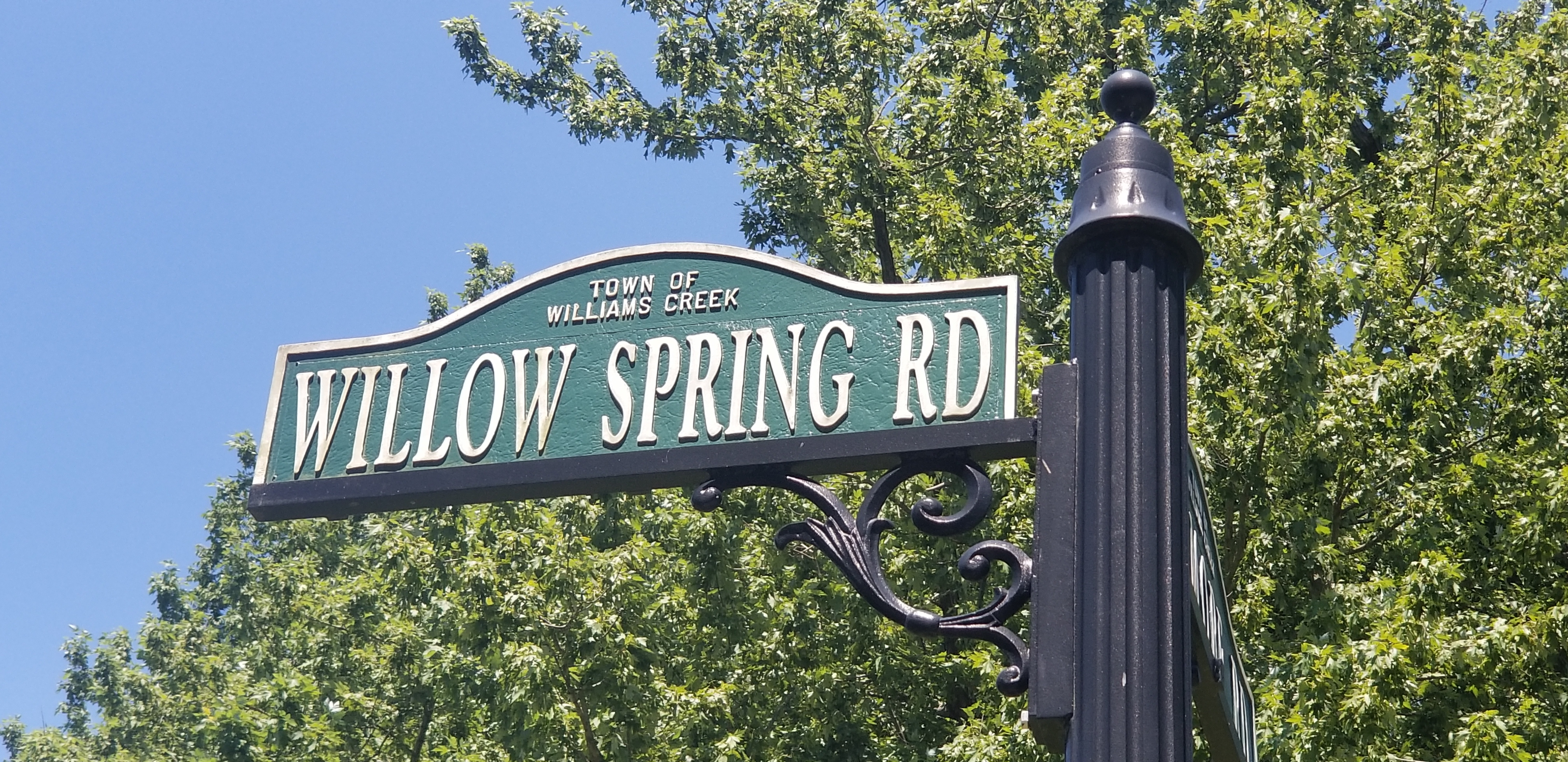
Road sign in Williams Creek

Williams Creek is located in northern Marion County. It is bordered to the southwest by a stream, also named Williams Creek, that flows to the southeast to join the White River in Marott Park. The creek also serves as the town border with Meridian Hills to the southwest.

According to the U.S. Census Bureau, Williams Creek has a total area of 0.33 square miles (0.85 km^{2}), all land.

== Demographics ==
Historical population
Census	Pop.	Note	%±
1940	119		—
1950	288		142.0%
1960	454		57.6%
1970	485		6.8%
1980	427		−12.0%
1990	425		−0.5%
2000	413		−2.8%
2010	407		−1.5%
2020	430		5.7%
U.S. Decennial Census

=== 2010 census ===
As of the census of 2010, there were 407 people, 146 households, and 119 families living in the town. The population density was 1,233.3 inhabitants per square mile (476.2/km^{2}). There were 155 housing units at an average density of 469.7 per square mile (181.4/km^{2}). The racial makeup of the town was 96.1% White, 1.0% African American, 1.5% Asian, 0.5% from other races, and 1.0% from two or more races. Hispanic or Latino of any race were 2.5% of the population.

There were 146 households, of which 33.6% had children under the age of 18 living with them, 78.1% were married couples living together, 2.1% had a female householder with no husband present, 1.4% had a male householder with no wife present, and 18.5% were non-families. 15.1% of all households were made up of individuals, and 11% had someone living alone who was 65 years of age or older. The average household size was 2.79 and the average family size was 3.12.

The median age in the town was 46.8 years. 30.2% of residents were under the age of 18; 2.7% were between the ages of 18 and 24; 14.2% were from 25 to 44; 32.4% were from 45 to 64; and 20.4% were 65 years of age or older. The gender makeup of the town was 49.4% male and 50.6% female.

=== 2000 census ===
As of the census of 2000, there were 413 people, 157 households, and 127 families living in the town. The population density was 1,221.1 inhabitants per square mile (471.5/km^{2}). There were 163 housing units at an average density of 481.9 per square mile (186.1/km^{2}). The racial makeup of the town was 97.58% White, 0.24% African American, 0.73% Asian, 0.24% from other races, and 1.21% from two or more races.

There were 157 households, out of which 35.0% had children under the age of 18 living with them, 75.8% were married couples living together, 4.5% had a female householder with no husband present, and 19.1% were non-families. 12.1% of all households were made up of individuals, and 7.6% had someone living alone who was 65 years of age or older. The average household size was 2.63 and the average family size was 2.91.

In the town, the population was spread out, with 25.2% under the age of 18, 3.9% from 18 to 24, 18.6% from 25 to 44, 36.1% from 45 to 64, and 16.2% who were 65 years of age or older. The median age was 46 years. For every 100 females, there were 87.7 males. For every 100 females age 18 and over, there were 87.3 males.

The median income for a household in the town was $172,996, and the median income for a family was $186,766. Males had a median income of $100,000 versus $49,583 for females. The per capita income for the town was $82,132. None of the families and 1.2% of the population were living below the poverty line, including no under eighteens and none of those over 64.

== Education ==
It is in the Washington Township Metropolitan School District.

== See also ==
- List of cities surrounded by another city
- List of neighborhoods in Indianapolis
