= Washington Township, Marion County, Indiana =

Washington Township Marion County
- Township
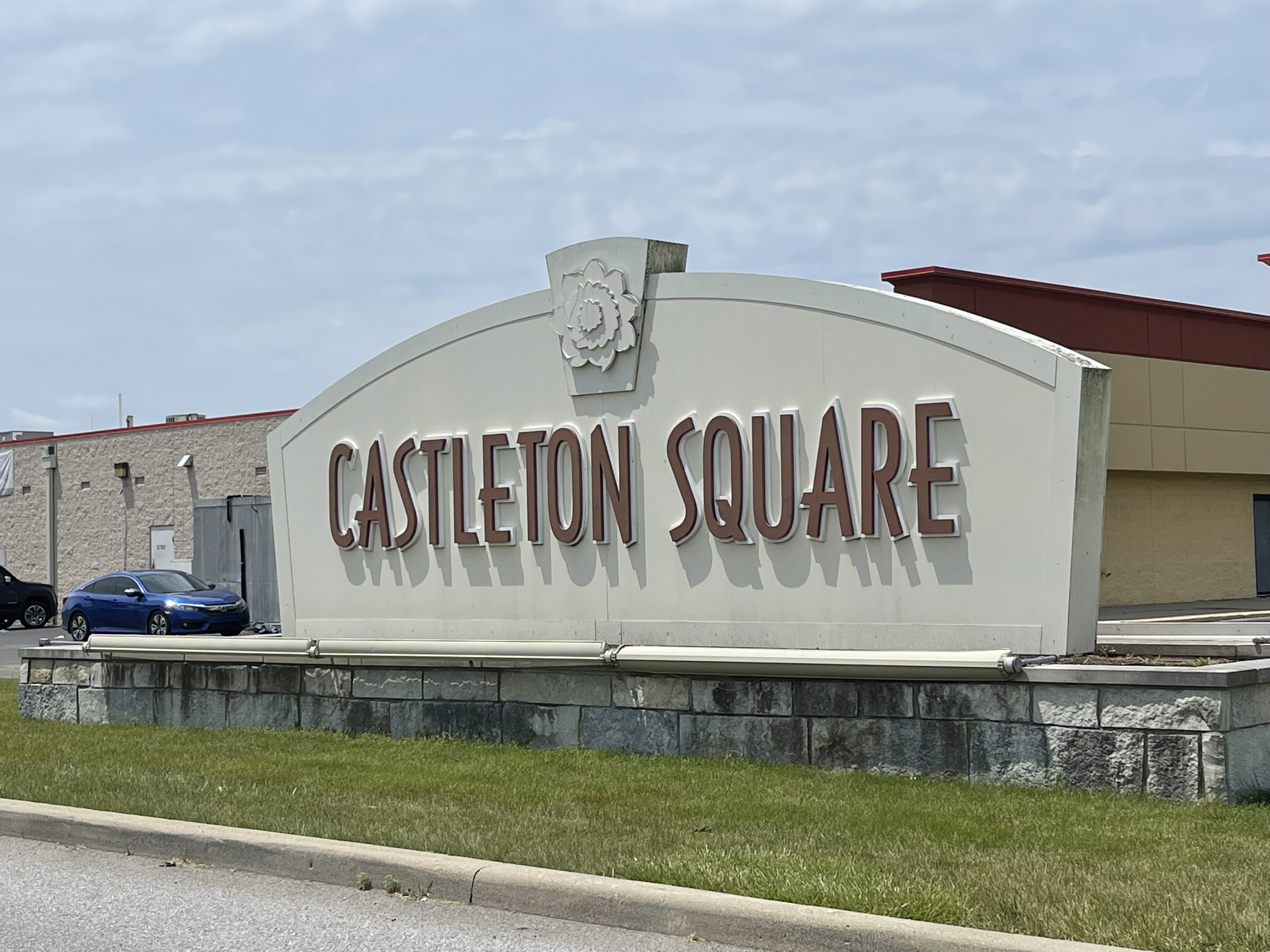
- Castleton Square, the largest mall in Indiana.

- Coordinates: 39°52′11″N 86°8′39″W
- Country: United States
- State: Indiana
- County: Marion
- Named for: George Washington

Government
  - Type: Indiana township

Area
  - Total: 49.7 sq mi (128.6 km^{2})
  - Land: 48.5 sq mi (125.7 km^{2})
  - Water: 1.1 sq mi (2.9 km^{2})
- Elevation: 715 ft (218 m)

Population (2020)
  - Total: 138,678
  - Density: 2,857/sq mi (1,103/km^{2})
- Time zone: UTC-5 (Eastern (EST))
  - Summer (DST): UTC-4 (EDT)
- FIPS code: 18-80792
- GNIS feature ID: 0454005
- Website: www.washtwp.org

Washington Township is one of the nine townships of Marion County, Indiana, located in the northern part of the county. The township is entirely within the city of Indianapolis. The population as of the 2020 census was 138,678, up from 132,049 at the 2010 census. The first settlement at Washington Township was made in 1819.

On January 1, 2007, the Washington Township Fire Department became the first township fire department in Marion County to consolidate into the Indianapolis Fire Department as part of Indianapolis Mayor Bart Peterson's proposed Indy Works government cost-savings plan, even though Indy Works, which included merging of Marion County fire departments as part of its cost saving efforts, failed to pass in the City-County Council.

Historical population
Census	Pop.	Note	%±
1890	2,400		—
1900	3,238		34.9%
1910	5,679		75.4%
1920	12,517		120.4%
1930	34,793		178.0%
1940	42,978		23.5%
1950	62,147		44.6%
1960	97,861		57.5%
1970	126,136		28.9%
1980	129,008		2.3%
1990	133,969		3.8%
2000	132,927		−0.8%
2010	132,049		−0.7%
2020	138,678		5.0%
Source: US Decennial Census

== Geography ==
=== Municipalities ===
- Crows Nest
- Indianapolis (vast majority of township)
- Meridian Hills
- North Crows Nest
- Rocky Ripple
- Spring Hill
- Williams Creek
- Wynnedale

=== Communities ===
- Broad Ripple Village
- Butler-Tarkington
- Castleton (partial)
- Fairgrounds
- Glendale
- Ladywood Estates
- Mapleton-Fall Creek
- Meadows (north half)
- Meridian-Kessler
- Nora
- Ravenswood

== Education ==
Much of the township is in the Washington Township Metropolitan School District. Portions are in Indianapolis Public Schools.
