= Castleton, Indianapolis =

Neighborhood in Indianapolis, Indiana, US

Castleton
- Neighborhood Area of Indianapolis
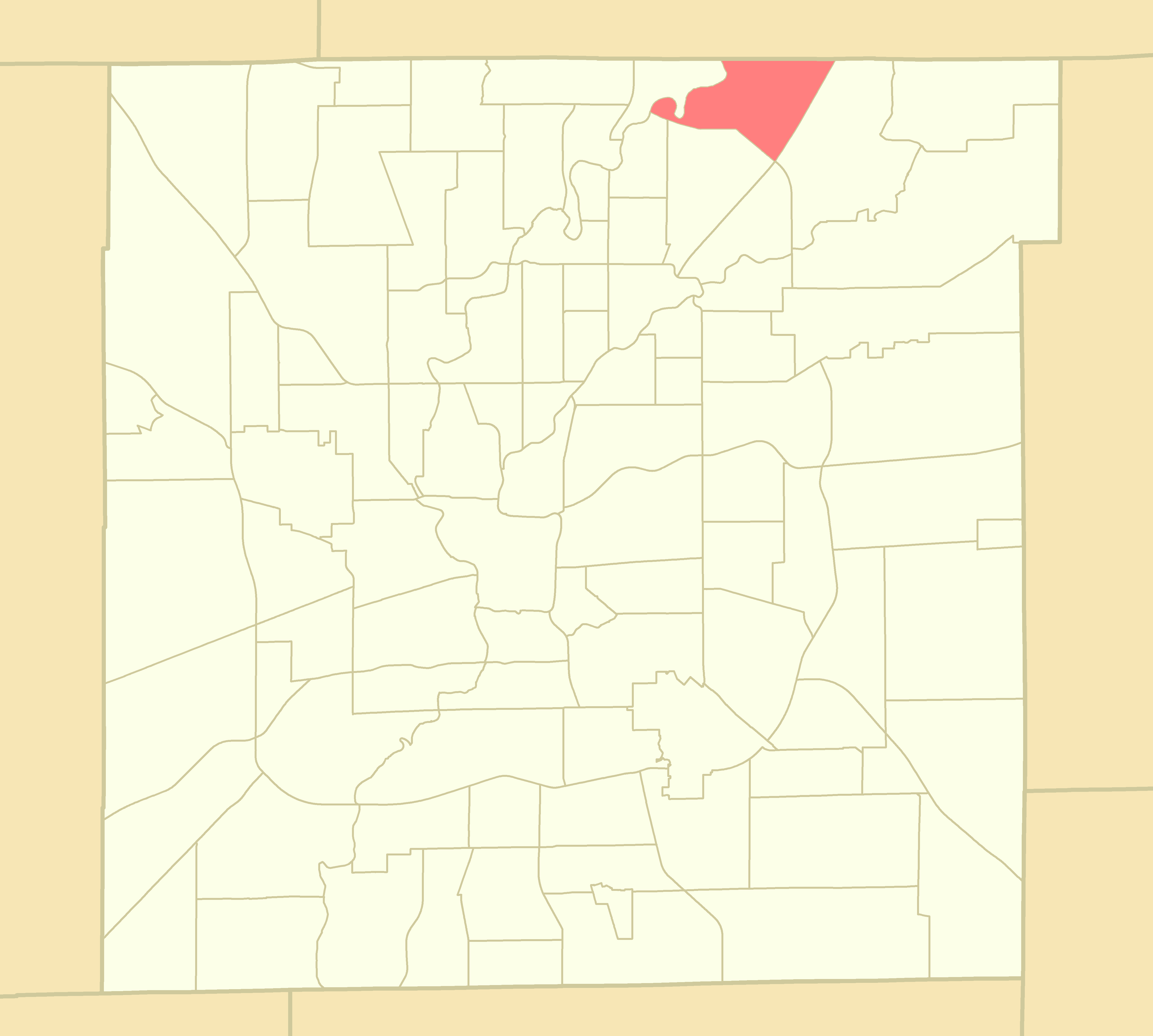
- Location of Castleton within Indianapolis–Marion County, Indiana
- Coordinates: 39°54′25″N 86°03′08″W
- Country: United States
- State: Indiana
- County: Marion
- Townships: Lawrence, Washington
- City: Indianapolis

Population (2020)
  - Total: 11,198
- Time zone: UTC−5 (EST)
  - Summer (DST): UTC−4 (EDT)
- ZIP codes: 46250, 46256
- Area code: 317 / 463

Castleton is a neighborhood area in Lawrence and Washington townships on the northeast side of Indianapolis, Indiana, United States. After shortly over a century of being an independent town, the locality was included in Indianapolis as part of Unigov consolidation in 1970 and was further dissolved in 1992. It is a primarily commercial district today.

== Location and boundaries ==
Historically, the former town of Castleton was platted near present-day 82nd St. and the former Nickel Plate Road, about 12 miles (19 km) northeast of downtown Indianapolis. The "neighborhood area" encompasses a greater geography than the historic town, which is the basis for sociodemographic data collection. (Note: Population figures for individual neighborhood areas can be accessed in two ways via IndyVitals.org: first, by hovering over the interactive map and selecting the neighborhood area, or by selecting the neighborhood area from the dropdown menu on the left side of the webpage.) Castleton is bounded by 96th St. (north), White River (west), Interstate 69 (east), and 82nd St. and Interstate 465 (south).

== History ==
Castleton was founded in 1852 by Thomas Gentry. The small town prospered as a service center for nearby farmers and travelers on the Nickel Plate Road. In the proceeding decades, the town saw gradual development, with a church, grade school, grain elevators, and a railroad depot. The first town board meeting occurred in 1906. In 1950, the town recorded a population of 268.

In 1965, county officials rezoned the area for commercial and light industrial land uses in anticipation of the local Interstate Highway System. The construction of Interstates 69 and 465 forced the demolition of some properties in Castleton, including a church, Masonic temple, and school. On January 1, 1970, Castleton became an "included town" under the consolidated city-county government of Indianapolis and Marion County (Unigov). In 1972, Castleton Square opened as the largest enclosed shopping mall in Indiana. Suburban development accelerated upon the mall's opening, with the construction of several single-family subdivisions, apartment complexes, shopping centers, and office parks in the 1980s and 1990s.

On November 18, 1991, the town board voted to dissolve the town of 37 residents. Indianapolis Mayor Stephen Goldsmith authorized the dissolution effective on January 19, 1992. Today, Castleton remains one of the metropolitan area's highest concentrations of commercial office and retail space. According to reporting from the Indianapolis Business Journal, the neighborhood is home to 2,800,000 sq ft (260,000 m^{2}) of retail and more than 900,000 sq ft (84,000 m^{2}) of commercial office.

== See also ==
- List of neighborhoods in Indianapolis
- Nickel Plate Trail
