= Wynnedale, Indiana =

- Town
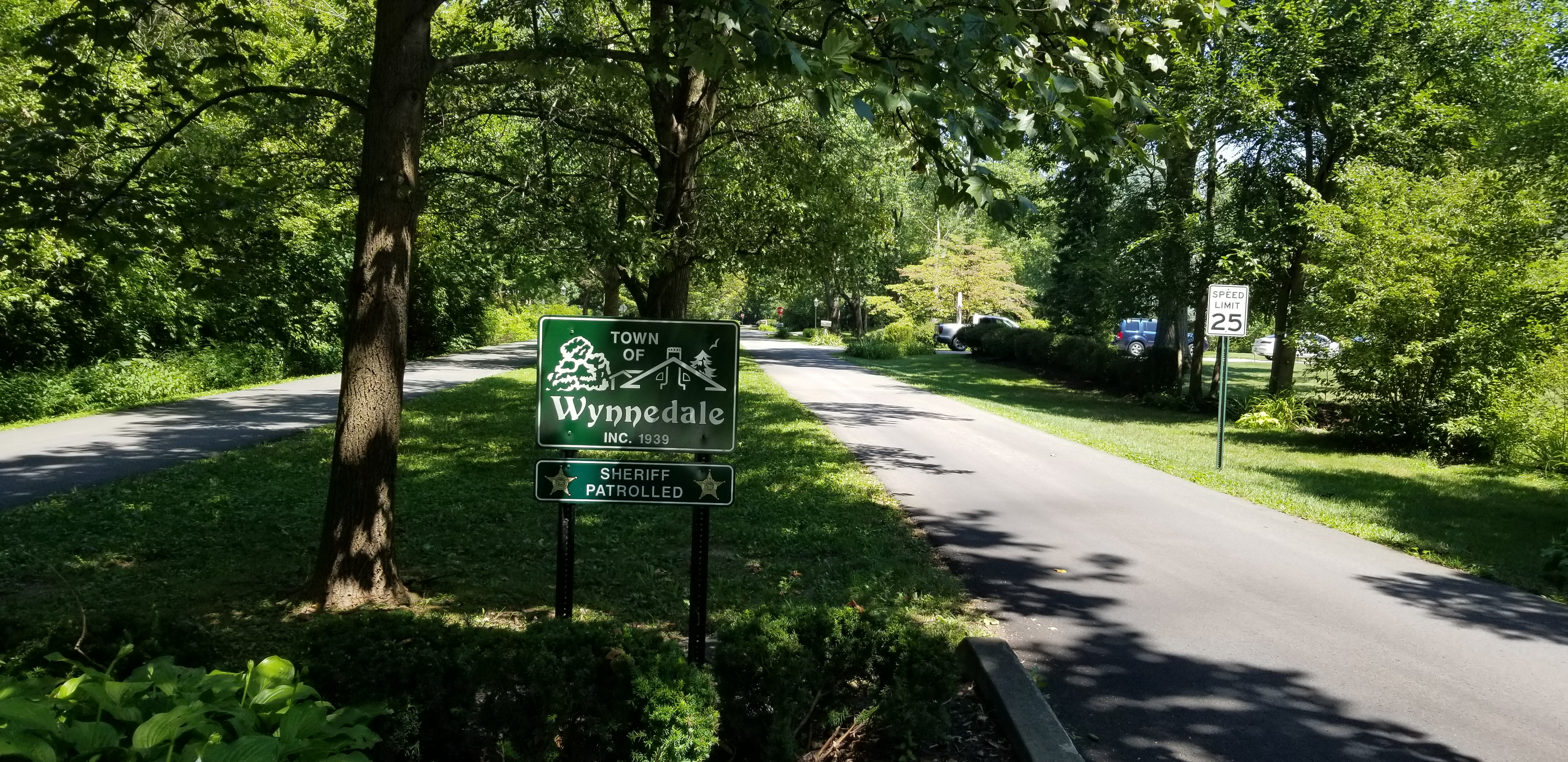

- Location in Marion County, Indiana
- Coordinates: 39°49′57″N 86°12′01″W
- Country: United States
- State: Indiana
- County: Marion
- Township: Washington

Area
  - Total: 0.16 sq mi (0.41 km^{2})
  - Land: 0.16 sq mi (0.41 km^{2})
  - Water: 0 sq mi (0.00 km^{2})
- Elevation: 742 ft (226 m)

Population (2020)
  - Total: 215
  - Density: 1,348.4/sq mi (520.63/km^{2})
- Time zone: UTC-5 (Eastern (EST))
  - Summer (DST): UTC-4 (EDT)
- ZIP Code: 46228
- Area code: 317
- FIPS code: 18-85742
- GNIS feature ID: 2397757
- Website: www.wynnedale.org

Wynnedale is a town in Washington Township, Marion County, Indiana, United States. The population was 215 at the 2020 census. It has existed as an "included town" since 1970, when it was incorporated into Indianapolis as part of Unigov. It is part of Indianapolis, but retains a functioning town government under IC 36-3-1-11.

== Geography ==
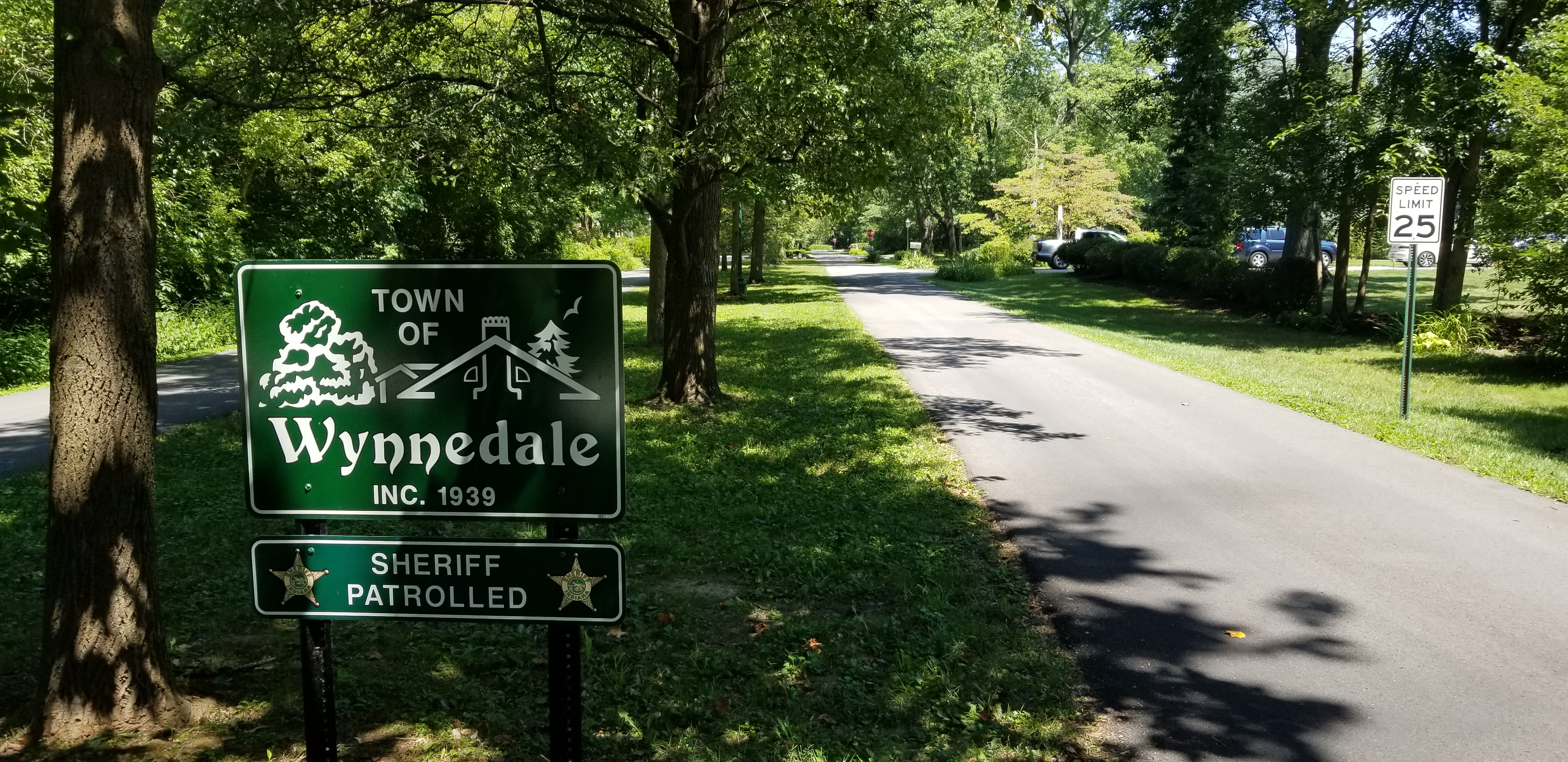
Sign welcoming people to Wynnedale

Wynnedale is located 5 miles (8 km) northwest of downtown Indianapolis. It is bordered to the east by the town of Spring Hill.

According to the U.S. Census Bureau, Wynnedale has a total area of 0.16 square miles (0.41 km^{2}), all land.

== Demographics ==
Historical population
Census	Pop.	Note	%±
1940	60		—
1950	75		25.0%
1960	174		132.0%
1970	124		−28.7%
1980	289		133.1%
1990	269		−6.9%
2000	275		2.2%
2010	231		−16.0%
2020	215		−6.9%
U.S. Decennial Census

=== 2010 census ===
As of the census of 2010, there were 231 people, 96 households, and 71 families living in the town. The population density was 1,443.8 inhabitants per square mile (557.5/km^{2}). There were 99 housing units at an average density of 618.8 per square mile (238.9/km^{2}). The racial makeup of the town was 61.0% White, 35.9% African American, 1.3% Asian, 0.4% from other races, and 1.3% from two or more races. Hispanic or Latino of any race were 0.9% of the population.

There were 96 households, of which 26.0% had children under the age of 18 living with them, 67.7% were married couples living together, 6.3% had a female householder with no husband present, and 26.0% were non-families. 21.9% of all households were made up of individuals, and 13.5% had someone living alone who was 65 years of age or older. The average household size was 2.41 and the average family size was 2.83.

The median age in the town was 52.4 years. 19.9% of residents were under the age of 18; 1.3% were between the ages of 18 and 24; 14.2% were from 25 to 44; 39% were from 45 to 64; and 25.5% were 65 years of age or older. The gender makeup of the town was 48.1% male and 51.9% female.

=== 2000 census ===
As of the census of 2000, there were 275 people, 108 households, and 84 families living in the town. The population density was 1,643.6 inhabitants per square mile (634.6/km^{2}). There were 112 housing units at an average density of 669.4 per square mile (258.5/km^{2}). The racial makeup of the town was 64.73% White, 33.09% African American, 0.36% Native American, 0.36% Asian, 1.45% from other races. Hispanic or Latino of any race were 1.45% of the population.

There were 108 households, out of which 31.5% had children under the age of 18 living with them, 67.6% were married couples living together, 7.4% had a female householder with no husband present, and 22.2% were non-families. 20.4% of all households were made up of individuals, and 8.3% had someone living alone who was 65 years of age or older. The average household size was 2.55 and the average family size was 2.82.

In the town, the population was spread out, with 21.1% under the age of 18, 3.6% from 18 to 24, 22.2% from 25 to 44, 32.7% from 45 to 64, and 20.4% who were 65 years of age or older. The median age was 48 years. For every 100 females, there were 111.5 males. For every 100 females age 18 and over, there were 104.7 males.

The median income for a household in the town was $93,778, and the median income for a family was $101,931. Males had a median income of $80,969 versus $32,344 for females. The per capita income for the town was $50,323. None of the families and 0.9% of the population were living below the poverty line, including no under eighteens and 4.5% of those over 64.

== Education ==
It is in the Washington Township Metropolitan School District.

Zoned schools include: Crooked Creek Elementary School, Westlane Middle School, and North Central High School (the sole comprehensive high school of the school district).

== See also ==
- List of cities surrounded by another city
- List of neighborhoods in Indianapolis
