= Crows Nest, Indiana =

- Town
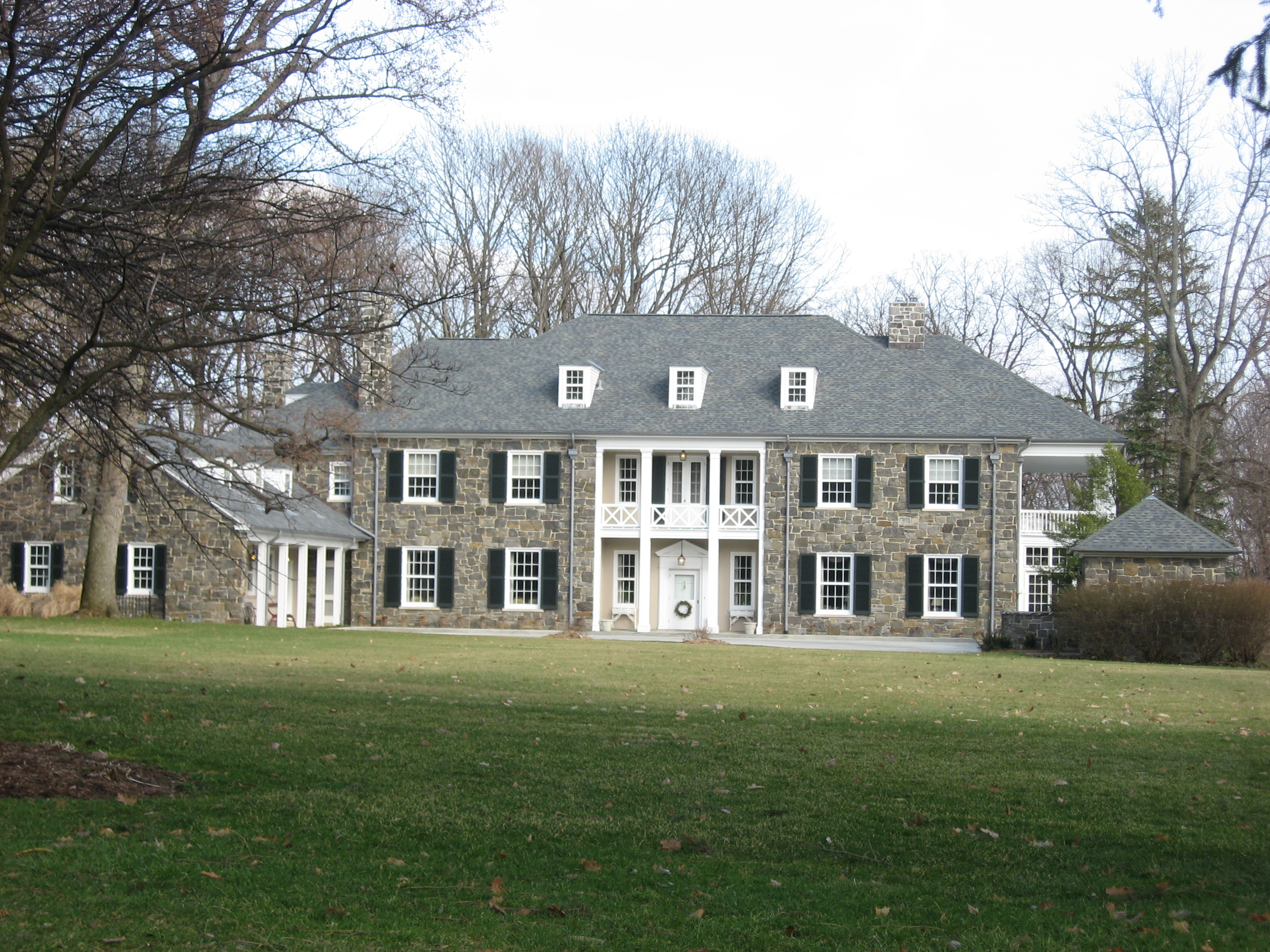
- The former home of Eli Lilly is in Crows Nest.

- Location in Marion County, Indiana
- Coordinates: 39°51′23″N 86°10′09″W
- Country: United States
- State: Indiana
- County: Marion
- Township: Washington
- Founded: 1927

Area
  - Total: 0.43 sq mi (1.11 km^{2})
  - Land: 0.43 sq mi (1.11 km^{2})
  - Water: 0 sq mi (0.00 km^{2})
- Elevation: 771 ft (235 m)

Population (2020)
  - Total: 67
  - Density: 156.1/sq mi (60.26/km^{2})
- Time zone: UTC-5 (EST)
  - Summer (DST): UTC-5 (EST)
- ZIP Code: 46228
- Area codes: 317/463
- FIPS code: 18-16156
- GNIS feature ID: 2396670
- Town of Crows Nest Historic District
- U.S. National Register of Historic Places
- U.S. Historic district
- Location within Indiana Location within the United States
- Location: Roughly bounded by Kessler Blvd., White R., and Questover Circle, Indianapolis
- Area: 65 acres (26 ha)
- Architect: Burns and James, Robert Frost Daggett, et al.
- Architectural style: Colonial Revival, Tudor Revival, et al.
- NRHP reference No.: 00000305
- Added to NRHP: April 13, 2000

Crows Nest is a town in Washington Township, Marion County, Indiana, United States, approximately 7 miles (11 km) north of downtown Indianapolis. The population was 67 at the 2020 census. It has existed as an "included town" since 1970, when it was incorporated into Indianapolis as part of Unigov. It is part of Indianapolis, but retains a functioning town government under IC 36-3-1-11.

== History ==
Crows Nest was founded in 1927 and supposedly was named from crows nesting nearby.

The Town of Crows Nest Historic District is a 65-acre (26 ha) historic district that was listed on the National Register of Historic Places in 2000. It encompasses 29 contributing buildings, five contributing sites, four contributing structures, and three contributing objects in an exclusive residential enclave of Indianapolis. The district developed between about 1905 and 1950, and includes representative examples of Tudor Revival, Colonial Revival, Renaissance Revival, and Art Deco style architecture. Notable contributing resources include Vellameda (1904–1905), W. Hathaway Simmons House (1914), Walden Estate (1927), Lane's End Estate (1928), Goodman House (1927), and Eli Lilly House (1930).

== Geography ==
Crows Nest is located in northern Marion County. It occupies 50-foot (15 m) or higher bluffs on the west side of the White River. The town is bordered to the north by the town of North Crows Nest and to the south by the town of Rocky Ripple. Kessler Boulevard W Drive forms the northern and northwest border of the town, and there are just two streets fully within the town: Sunset Lane south of Kessler Boulevard and Questover Circle.

According to the U.S. Census Bureau, Crows Nest has a total area of 0.43 square miles (1.11 km^{2}), all land.

== Demographics ==
Historical population
Census	Pop.	Note	%±
1930	79		—
1940	112		41.8%
1950	86		−23.2%
1960	122		41.9%
1970	100		−18.0%
1980	106		6.0%
1990	114		7.5%
2000	96		−15.8%
2010	73		−24.0%
2020	67		−8.2%
U.S. Decennial Census

=== 2010 census ===
As of the census of 2010, there were 73 people, 34 households, and 28 families living in the town. The population density was 169.8 inhabitants per square mile (65.6/km^{2}). There were 38 housing units at an average density of 88.4 per square mile (34.1/km^{2}). The racial makeup of the town was 97.3% White and 2.7% African American. Hispanic or Latino of any race were 1.4% of the population.

There were 34 households, of which 5.9% had children under the age of 18 living with them, 73.5% were married couples living together, 2.9% had a female householder with no husband present, 5.9% had a male householder with no wife present, and 17.6% were non-families. 14.7% of all households were made up of individuals. The average household size was 2.15 and the average family size was 2.32.

The median age in the town was 60.3 years. 4.1% of residents were under the age of 18; 6.8% were between the ages of 18 and 24; 9.6% were from 25 to 44; 53.5% were from 45 to 64; and 26% were 65 years of age or older. The gender makeup of the town was 53.4% male and 46.6% female.

=== 2000 census ===
As of the census of 2000, there were 96 people, 39 households, and 31 families living in the town. The population density was 215.2 inhabitants per square mile (83.1/km^{2}). There were 41 housing units at an average density of 91.9 per square mile (35.5/km^{2}). The racial makeup of the town was 100.00% White.

There were 39 households, out of which 28.2% had children under the age of 18 living with them, 71.8% were married couples living together, 2.6% had a female householder with no husband present, and 20.5% were non-families. 17.9% of all households were made up of individuals, and 12.8% had someone living alone who was 65 years of age or older. The average household size was 2.46 and the average family size was 2.77.

In the town, the population was spread out, with 19.8% under the age of 18, 6.3% from 18 to 24, 11.5% from 25 to 44, 41.7% from 45 to 64, and 20.8% who were 65 years of age or older. The median age was 52 years. For every 100 females, there were 88.2 males. For every 100 females age 18 and over, there were 87.8 males.

The median income for a household in the town was $154,780, and the median income for a family was $153,320. Males had a median income of $100,000 versus $68,750 for females. The per capita income for the town was $100,565. None of the population or the families were below the poverty line.

== Education ==
It is in the Washington Township Metropolitan School District.

Zoned schools include: Fox Hill Elementary School, Westlane Middle School, and North Central High School (the sole comprehensive high school of the school district).

== See also ==
- List of cities surrounded by another city
- List of neighborhoods in Indianapolis
