= North Crows Nest, Indiana =

- Town
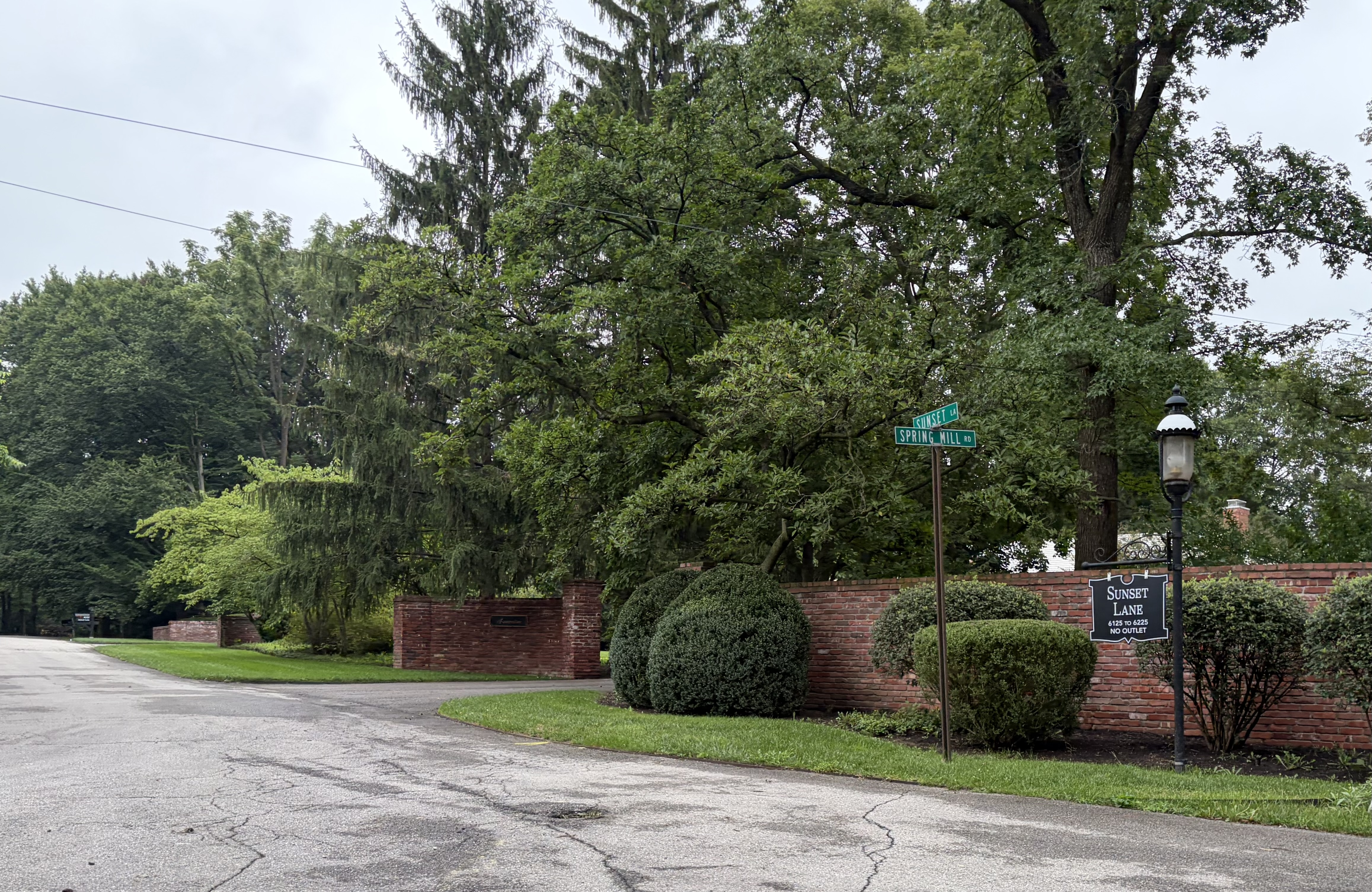
- An intersection in North Crows Nest

- Location in Marion County, Indiana
- Coordinates: 39°51′58″N 86°09′45″W
- Country: United States
- State: Indiana
- County: Marion
- Township: Washington

Area
  - Total: 0.066 sq mi (0.17 km^{2})
  - Land: 0.066 sq mi (0.17 km^{2})
  - Water: 0 sq mi (0.00 km^{2})
- Elevation: 781 ft (238 m)

Population (2020)
  - Total: 44
  - Density: 681.3/sq mi (263.06/km^{2})
- Time zone: UTC-5 (Eastern (EST))
  - Summer (DST): UTC-4 (EDT)
- ZIP code: 46228
- Area codes: 317/463
- FIPS code: 18-54612
- GNIS feature ID: 2396819

North Crows Nest is a town in Washington Township, Marion County, Indiana, United States. It is approximately 7 miles (11 km) north of downtown Indianapolis. The population was 44 at the 2020 census. It has existed as an "included town" since 1970, when it was incorporated into Indianapolis as part of Unigov. It is part of Indianapolis, but retains town governmental powers under IC 36-3-1-11.

== Geography ==
North Crows Nest is located in northern Marion County atop bluffs that rise 70 feet (21 m) over the White River. It is bordered to the south by the town of Crows Nest, while the White River forms the eastern border.

According to the U.S. Census Bureau, North Crows Nest has a total area of 0.06 square miles (0.16 km^{2}), all land.

== Demographics ==
Historical population
Census	Pop.	Note	%±
1950	46		—
1960	60		30.4%
1970	50		−16.7%
1980	82		64.0%
1990	57		−30.5%
2000	42		−26.3%
2010	45		7.1%
2020	44		−2.2%
U.S. Decennial Census

=== 2010 census ===
As of the census of 2010, there were 45 people, 19 households, and 15 families living in the town. The population density was 642.9 inhabitants per square mile (248.2/km^{2}). There were 19 housing units at an average density of 271.4 per square mile (104.8/km^{2}). The racial makeup of the town was 100.0% White.

There were 19 households, of which 21.1% had children under the age of 18 living with them, 73.7% were married couples living together, 5.3% had a male householder with no wife present, and 21.1% were non-families. 15.8% of all households were made up of individuals, and 5.3% had someone living alone who was 65 years of age or older. The average household size was 2.37 and the average family size was 2.67.

The median age in the town was 47.5 years. 22.2% of residents were under the age of 18; 0.0% were between the ages of 18 and 24; 22.2% were from 25 to 44; 31% were from 45 to 64; and 24.4% were 65 years of age or older. The gender makeup of the town was 51.1% male and 48.9% female.

=== 2000 census ===
As of the census of 2000, there were 42 people, 18 households, and 16 families living in the town. The population density was 654.0 inhabitants per square mile (252.5/km^{2}). There were 18 housing units at an average density of 280.3 per square mile (108.2/km^{2}). The racial makeup of the town was 100.00% White.

There were 18 households, out of which 22.2% had children under the age of 18 living with them, 72.2% were married couples living together, 5.6% had a female householder with no husband present, and 11.1% were non-families. 11.1% of all households were made up of individuals, and none had someone living alone who was 65 years of age or older. The average household size was 2.33 and the average family size was 2.50.

In the town, the population was spread out, with 9.5% under the age of 18, 9.5% from 18 to 24, 14.3% from 25 to 44, 42.9% from 45 to 64, and 23.8% who were 65 years of age or older. The median age was 55 years. For every 100 females, there were 100.0 males. For every 100 females age 18 and over, there were 111.1 males.

The median income for a household in the town was $132,364, and the median income for a family was $132,364. Males had a median income of $100,000 versus $12,083 for females. The per capita income for the town was $48,029. None of the population or the families were below the poverty line.

== See also ==
- List of cities surrounded by another city
- List of neighborhoods in Indianapolis
