= Castleton Square =

Shopping mall in Indianapolis, Indiana, US

Coordinates: 39°54′32″N 86°03′54″W

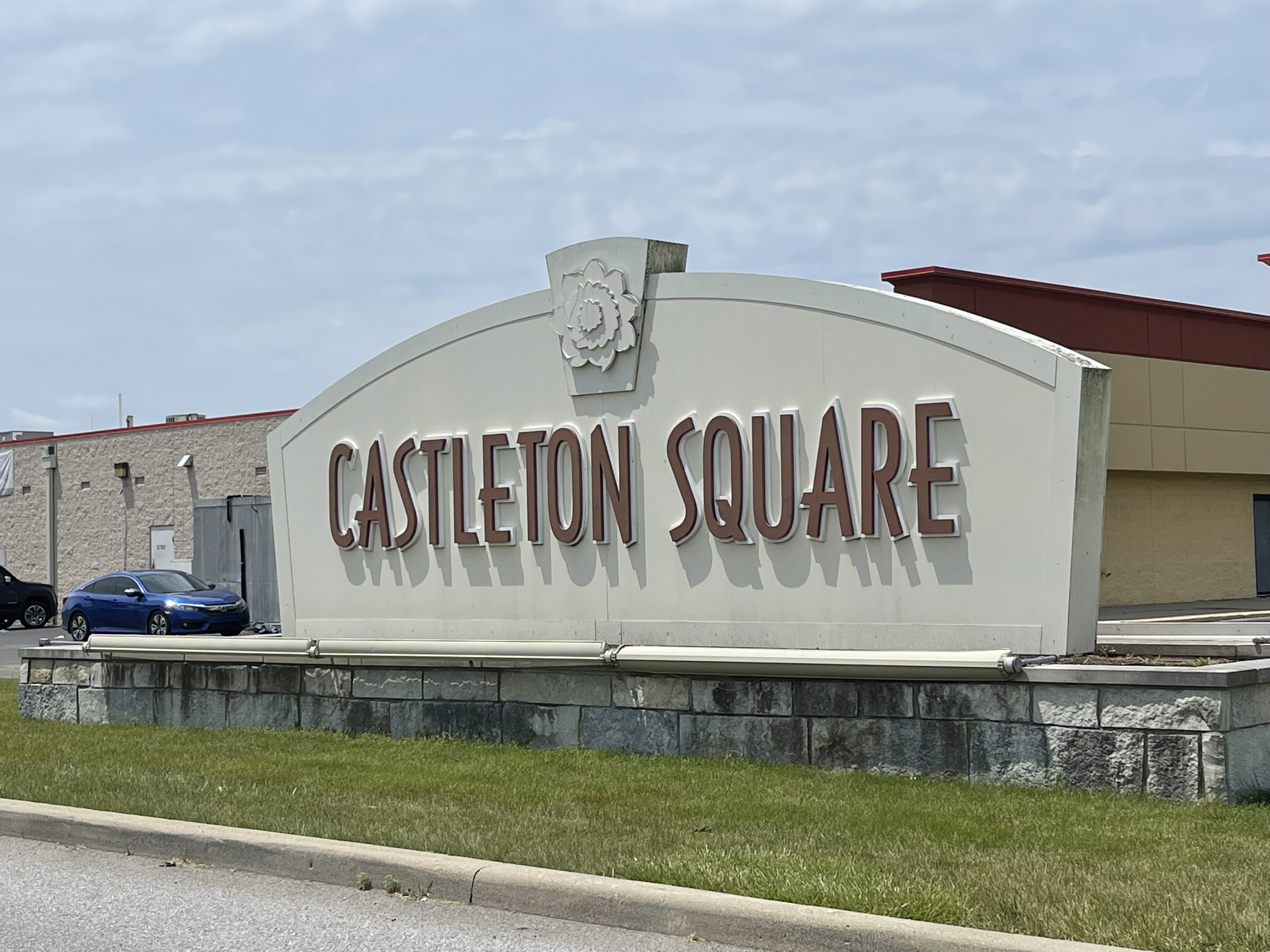
- Castleton Square
- Location: Indianapolis, Indiana, United States
- Address: 6020 East 82nd Street
- Opened: September 13, 1972; 54 years ago
- Developer: Edward J. DeBartolo Corporation and Homart Development Company
- Manager: Simon Property Group
- Owner: Simon Property Group
- Num. of stores: 130+
- Floor area: 1,381,533 sq ft (128,349 m^{2})
- Floors: 1 (2 in Dick's Sporting Goods, JCPenney, 3 in Macy's)
- Parking: surface parking
- Public transit: 19, 86
- Website: simon.com/mall/castleton-square

Castleton Square is an enclosed shopping mall in the Castleton neighborhood on the northeastern side of Indianapolis, Indiana, United States. Built by Edward J. DeBartolo Corporation and Homart Development Company in 1972, it is owned and managed by Simon Property Group. It is the largest mall in the state of Indiana, and has remained so since its construction. The center's original anchor stores were JCPenney, Sears, Lazarus, and Woolworth. Expansions in 1990 and 1998 added to the total number of anchor and inline stores, while also adding a food court. Overall, Castleton Square consists of over 130 inline stores. Its anchor stores are Dick's Sporting Goods, Hobby Lobby, JCPenney, Macy's, Primark, and Von Maur.

== History ==
Youngstown, Ohio-based shopping mall development company Edward J. DeBartolo Corporation formed a joint venture with Homart Development Company, a shopping mall development subsidiary of the department store chain Sears, to begin development on Castleton Square in 1971. DeBartolo announced the mall's development in January of that year and began groundbreaking soon afterward. The original plans called for a Y-shaped enclosed mall with three anchor stores: Sears, JCPenney, and Rike Kumler Co. (Rike's), a department store chain based out of Dayton, Ohio. The mall would be situated on 82nd Street just outside the Interstate 465 beltway within the Castleton neighborhood on the northeastern side of Indianapolis. It was the second of three malls built by DeBartolo as a part of its expansion into Indianapolis, following Lafayette Square Mall in 1968 and preceding Washington Square Mall in 1974. The company chose to build on the northeastern side of the Indianapolis metropolitan area, as the area was projected for further suburban growth in the intervening years. Similarly, research conducted by Sears showed a trend in residential growth to the city's northeast side, thus creating a market which the chain deemed suitable for a new store.

To accommodate for mall traffic, the Indiana Department of Transportation announced prior to the mall's development that it would expand 82nd Street to a four-lane divided highway. Federated Department Stores (now Macy's, Inc.), then-owners of the Rike's chain, confirmed in late 1971 that the third anchor of Castleton Square would instead be Lazarus, a Columbus, Ohio-based chain then also under their ownership. Also confirmed as tenants for the mall by 1972 were a Kroger supermarket, an F. W. Woolworth Company dime store, and a three-screen movie theater. Inline tenants would include Robert Hall Clothes, Hickory Farms, Kinney Shoes, Zales Jewelers, Waldenbooks, and Orange Julius.

=== 1970s and 1980s ===
Upon opening, the 1,116,160-square-foot (103,695 m^{2}) mall was the largest in the state of Indiana. Sears was the first store to open, doing so in August 1972. One month later, Kroger and 20 other mall shops had opened as well. Official opening ceremonies occurred on September 13, 1972, and were initiated by a ribbon-cutting ceremony hosted by Indianapolis' then-mayor Richard Lugar. Architectural features of the mall included a 20-foot (6.1 m)-wide fountain and chandeliers in center court, 22 planters filled with live tropical plants, 102 circular benches, skylights, and terrazzo flooring. The mall also featured parking for up to 7,050 cars. By Christmas 1972, the mall had increased to 59 stores. JCPenney opened for business in January 1973, followed by Woolworth in March. The Lazarus store, their first location in Indiana, opened in August 1973. Consisting of 311,855 square feet (28,972.3 m^{2}), the store featured three levels and a restaurant overlooking the mall's center court. Opening ceremonies for the store were attended by William P. Giovanello, the chain's then-president. At the time of the store's opening, DeBartolo confirmed that both Washington Square and Lafayette Square malls would also include Lazarus stores.

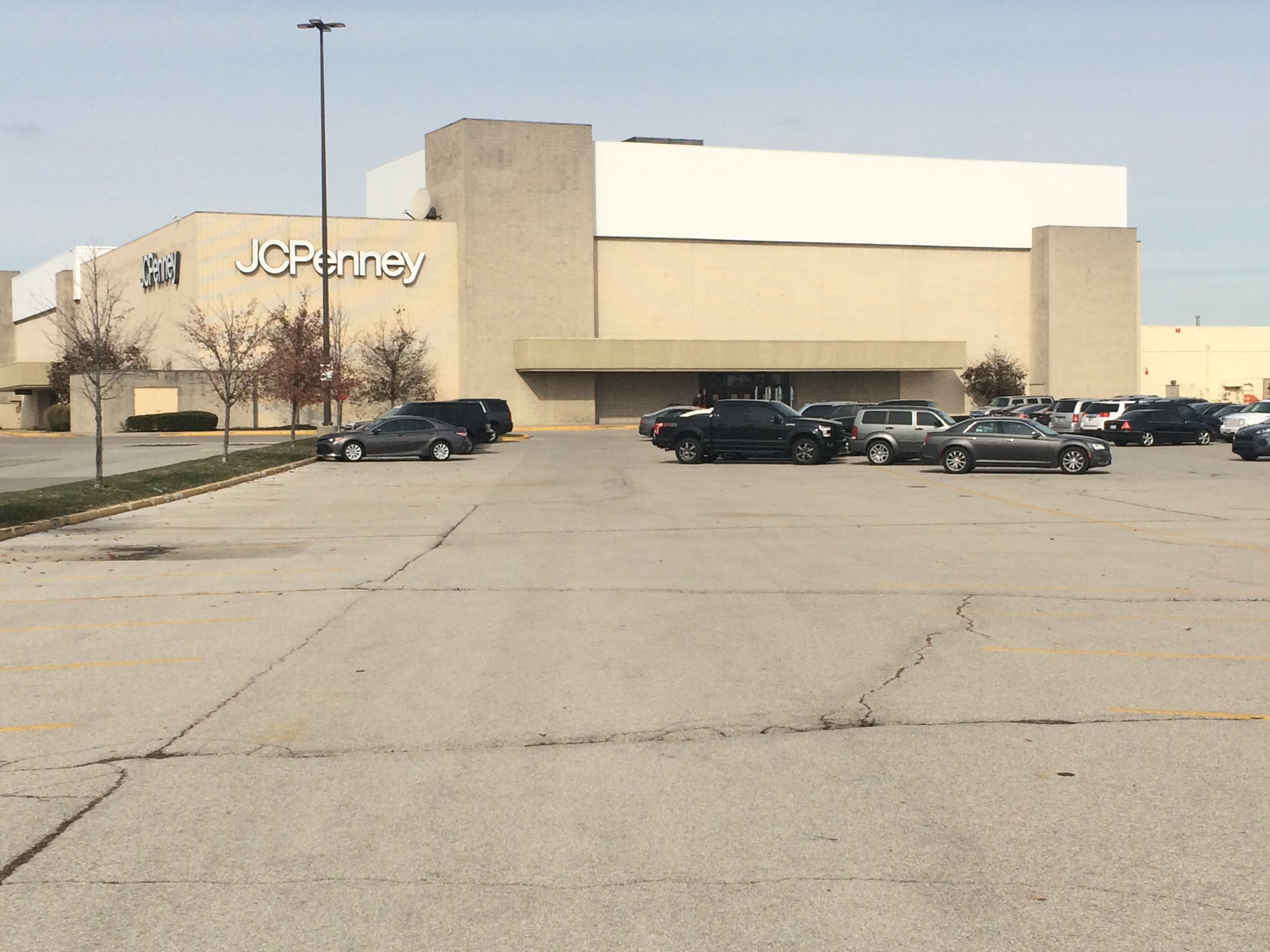
JCPenney, seen here in November 2019, is an original tenant.

General Cinema Corporation expanded its presence at Castleton Square in 1976 by building a second cinema in the parking lot northeast of Sears. Kroger exited the mall in 1979 to move to a larger store further down 82nd Street, and its former location in the mall was subdivided for additional mall space. Woolworth closed at the mall in April 1982 due to unprofitability. During the 1982 Christmas season, the former Woolworth space was used by several local automotive dealers as a temporary showroom. In 1983, Edward J. DeBartolo Corporation announced that the mall would be receiving a thorough renovation which would include new planters and benches, removal of the center court's fountain in favor of a performance stage, new lighting, heightened ceilings in the department stores, and a customer service kiosk. In addition, Kohl's would be opening a department store in the former location of Woolworth. The store was one of four opened that year by Kohl's upon entry into Indianapolis by acquisition of vacated Woolworth properties. Tenth-anniversary festivities coinciding with the mall renovation and opening of Kohl's included performances by more than fifty circus performers.

=== 1990s ===
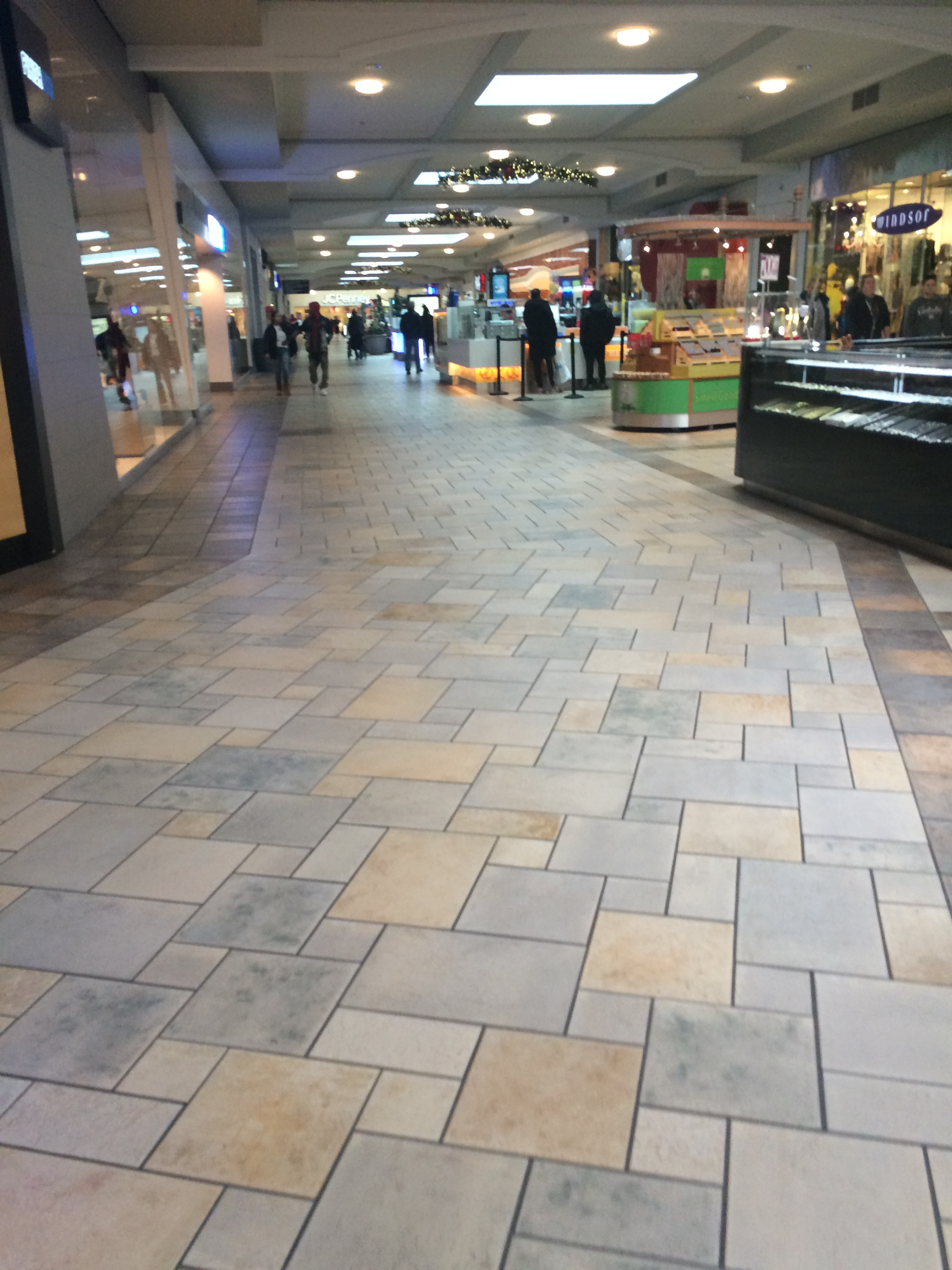
A mall concourse in November 2019.

No other major changes occurred at the mall until 1990, when two more anchor stores were added. First was L. S. Ayres, which built a 150,000-square-foot (14,000 m^{2}) prototype store onto the mall's south side and opened for business in August 1990. L. S. Ayres chose to build the store in order to attract customers from cities northeast of Indianapolis, such as Anderson and Muncie. Unlike its other stores at the time, the Castleton Square store did not sell furniture due to a proliferation of furniture stores around the mall. Two months later, a 108,000-square-foot (10,000 m^{2}) Montgomery Ward department store opened off the JCPenney wing. The store was Montgomery Ward's first purpose-built store in an Indianapolis mall, as their other three shopping mall stores (Lafayette Square, Washington Square, and Greenwood Park Mall) were all purchased from William H. Block Co. in 1988. Also unlike those stores, the Castleton Square location featured appliance and electronic repair centers. A Best Buy store opened right next to the mall on October 30, 1992.

Yet another change in anchor stores ensued in early 1997 when Kohl's moved out of the mall to a larger store in the Geist neighborhood. Simon Property Group, which merged with DeBartolo Corporation in 1996, announced in July 1997 that the Kohl's store would be demolished in favor of a new wing featuring a food court and a Galyan's sporting goods store, along with renovations to mall entrances, skylights, and landscaping, plus the addition of kiosk shops and new larger restroom facilities. Three months later, Montgomery Ward announced that it would close its location at Castleton Square, along with the ones at Lafayette Square and Washington Square. Simon attempted to purchase the store back from Montgomery Ward in 1998 with the intention of leasing it to Lord & Taylor, but the company was outbid by Von Maur, which had been seeking locations in the Indianapolis market for several years prior. Von Maur opened for business in June 1998. Galyan's also opened for business in mid-1998, thus becoming the company's first store to be located in a shopping mall. The store was nearly double the size of the existing Galyan's locations in Indianapolis at the time. By year's end, the accompanying food court had opened as well. It featured 15 restaurants and décor themed around gardening, along with a fountain and a children's play area.

=== 21st century ===
In October 2002, a Costco store opened north of the mall. In 2003, Federated Department Stores rebranded all Lazarus locations as Lazarus-Macy's in order to expand the Macy's name throughout the United States. The dual-branding also introduced several Macy's product lines to the merchandise mix of Lazarus. The same year, both floors of the Galyan's building were expanded, increasing the store size by 20,000 square feet (1,900 m^{2}); one year later, Galyan's was sold to Dick's Sporting Goods, resulting in the closure of a nearby Dick's Sporting Goods which had only been open for a year. Federated acquired The May Department Stores Company, then the parent company of L. S. Ayres, in 2006 and announced plans to convert most of the May Department Stores brands to Macy's. As part of this, the Lazarus-Macy's store was rebranded again to just Macy's. Castleton Square was one of four malls in Indiana to have both a Macy's and a division of May Department Stores (L. S. Ayres). As a result, Federated chose to maintain the four existing Macy's sites originally Lazarus and close the May Department stores instead. All four L. S. Ayres locations were closed in mid-2006. A year after closure, the building was demolished for a new outdoor concourse featuring Borders Books & Music, an AMC Theatres multiplex, Johnny Rockets, Stir Crazy, Cold Stone Creamery, and H&M. Following the closure of Borders in 2011, its space was renovated for the clothing store Forever 21. McAlister's Deli opened at the mall in late 2014.

On May 31, 2018, it was announced that the two-story Sears store would close in September 2018, along with 62 others across the country. At the time of closure, it was the last remaining Sears in Indianapolis. The same year, Macy's announced that the Castleton Square store would be part of its "Growth 50" campaign to add new options for shoppers at some of its more profitable locations. As of 2019, Castleton Square remains the largest mall in the state of Indiana, with more than 130 stores. The mall was remodeled in early 2025 with new flooring, paint, and signage. In 2025, Hobby Lobby opened in a portion of the former Sears. Primark announced they would open a 30,000-square-foot (2,800 m^{2}) store in the remaining available portion of the former Sears. Primark opened to the public on July 23, 2026. It is the first Primark to open in Indiana.

== See also ==
- Economy of Indianapolis
- List of attractions and events in Indianapolis
- List of shopping malls in the United States
- List of Simon Property Group properties
