= Spring Hill, Indiana =

- Town
- Location in Marion County, Indiana
- Coordinates: 39°50′05″N 86°11′33″W
- Country: United States
- State: Indiana
- County: Marion
- Township: Washington
- Incorporated: 1926

Area
  - Total: 0.11 sq mi (0.28 km^{2})
  - Land: 0.11 sq mi (0.28 km^{2})
  - Water: 0 sq mi (0.00 km^{2})
- Elevation: 725 ft (221 m)

Population (2020)
  - Total: 95
  - Density: 886.7/sq mi (342.35/km^{2})
- Time zone: UTC-5 (Eastern (EST))
  - Summer (DST): UTC-4 (EDT)
- FIPS code: 18-72232
- GNIS feature ID: 2397674
- Website: springhillindiana.org

Spring Hill is a town in Marion County, Indiana, United States. The population was 95 at the 2020 census. It has existed as an "included town" since 1970, when it was incorporated into Indianapolis as part of Unigov. It is part of Indianapolis, but retains town governmental powers under IC 36-3-1-11.

== History ==
Spring Hill was incorporated as a town in 1926.

== Geography ==
Spring Hill is located northwest of the center of Marion County. It sits on a bluff rising 60 feet (18 m) above the west bank of the White River. It is 6 miles (10 km) northwest of downtown Indianapolis.

According to the U.S. Census Bureau, Spring Hill has a total area of 0.11 square miles (0.28 km^{2}), all land.

== Demographics ==
Spring Hill, Indiana – Racial and ethnic composition Note: the US Census treats Hispanic/Latino as an ethnic category. This table excludes Latinos from the racial categories and assigns them to a separate category. Hispanics/Latinos may be of any race.
Race / Ethnicity (NH = Non-Hispanic)	Pop 2000	Pop 2010	Pop 2020	% 2000	% 2010	% 2020
White alone (NH)	92	77	74	94.85%	78.57%	77.89%
Black or African American alone (NH)	5	17	6	5.15%	17.35%	6.32%
Native American or Alaska Native alone (NH)	0	1	0	0.00%	1.02%	0.00%
Asian alone (NH)	0	0	1	0.00%	0.00%	1.05%
Native Hawaiian or Pacific Islander alone (NH)	0	0	0	0.00%	0.00%	0.00%
Other race alone (NH)	0	0	0	0.00%	0.00%	0.00%
Mixed race or Multiracial (NH)	0	3	6	0.00%	3.06%	6.32%
Hispanic or Latino (any race)	0	0	8	0.00%	0.00%	8.42%
Total	97	98	95	100.00%	100.00%	100.00%

Historical population
Census	Pop.	Note	%±
1930	22		—
1940	28		27.3%
1950	27		−3.6%
1960	25		−7.4%
1970	22		−12.0%
1980	27		22.7%
1990	112		314.8%
2000	97		−13.4%
2010	98		1.0%
2020	95		−3.1%
U.S. Decennial Census

=== 2010 census ===
As of the census of 2010, there were 98 people, 55 households, and 31 families living in the town. The population density was 890.9 inhabitants per square mile (344.0/km^{2}). There were 60 housing units at an average density of 545.5 per square mile (210.6/km^{2}). The racial makeup of the town was 78.6% White, 17.3% African American, 1.0% Native American, and 3.1% from two or more races.

There were 55 households, of which 3.6% had children under the age of 18 living with them, 50.9% were married couples living together, 3.6% had a female householder with no husband present, 1.8% had a male householder with no wife present, and 43.6% were non-families. 34.5% of all households were made up of individuals, and 23.6% had someone living alone who was 65 years of age or older. The average household size was 1.78 and the average family size was 2.19.

The median age in the town was 64.7 years. 4.1% of residents were under the age of 18; 1% were between the ages of 18 and 24; 5% were from 25 to 44; 40.7% were from 45 to 64; and 49% were 65 years of age or older. The gender makeup of the town was 54.1% male and 45.9% female.

=== 2000 census ===
As of the census of 2000, there were 97 people, 55 households, and 28 families living in the town. The population density was 881.1 inhabitants per square mile (340.2/km^{2}). There were 63 housing units at an average density of 572.3 per square mile (221.0/km^{2}). The racial makeup of the town was 94.85% White and 5.15% African American.

There were 55 households, out of which 3.6% had children under the age of 18 living with them, 52.7% were married couples living together, and 47.3% were non-families. 36.4% of all households were made up of individuals, and 10.9% had someone living alone who was 65 years of age or older. The average household size was 1.76 and the average family size was 2.21.

In the town, the population was spread out, with 5.2% under the age of 18, 2.1% from 18 to 24, 13.4% from 25 to 44, 47.4% from 45 to 64, and 32.0% who were 65 years of age or older. The median age was 58 years. For every 100 females, there were 94.0 males. For every 100 females age 18 and over, there were 95.7 males.

The median income for a household in the town was $103,337, and the median income for a family was $107,033. Males had a median income of $44,063 versus $55,000 for females. The per capita income for the town was $77,390. There were no families and 10.4% of the population living below the poverty line, including no under eighteens and none of those over 64.

== Education ==
It is in the Washington Township Metropolitan School District.

Zoned schools include: Crooked Creek Elementary School, Westlane Middle School, and North Central High School (the sole comprehensive high school of the school district).

== See also ==
- List of cities surrounded by another city
- List of neighborhoods in Indianapolis
