= Meridian Hills, Indiana =

- Town
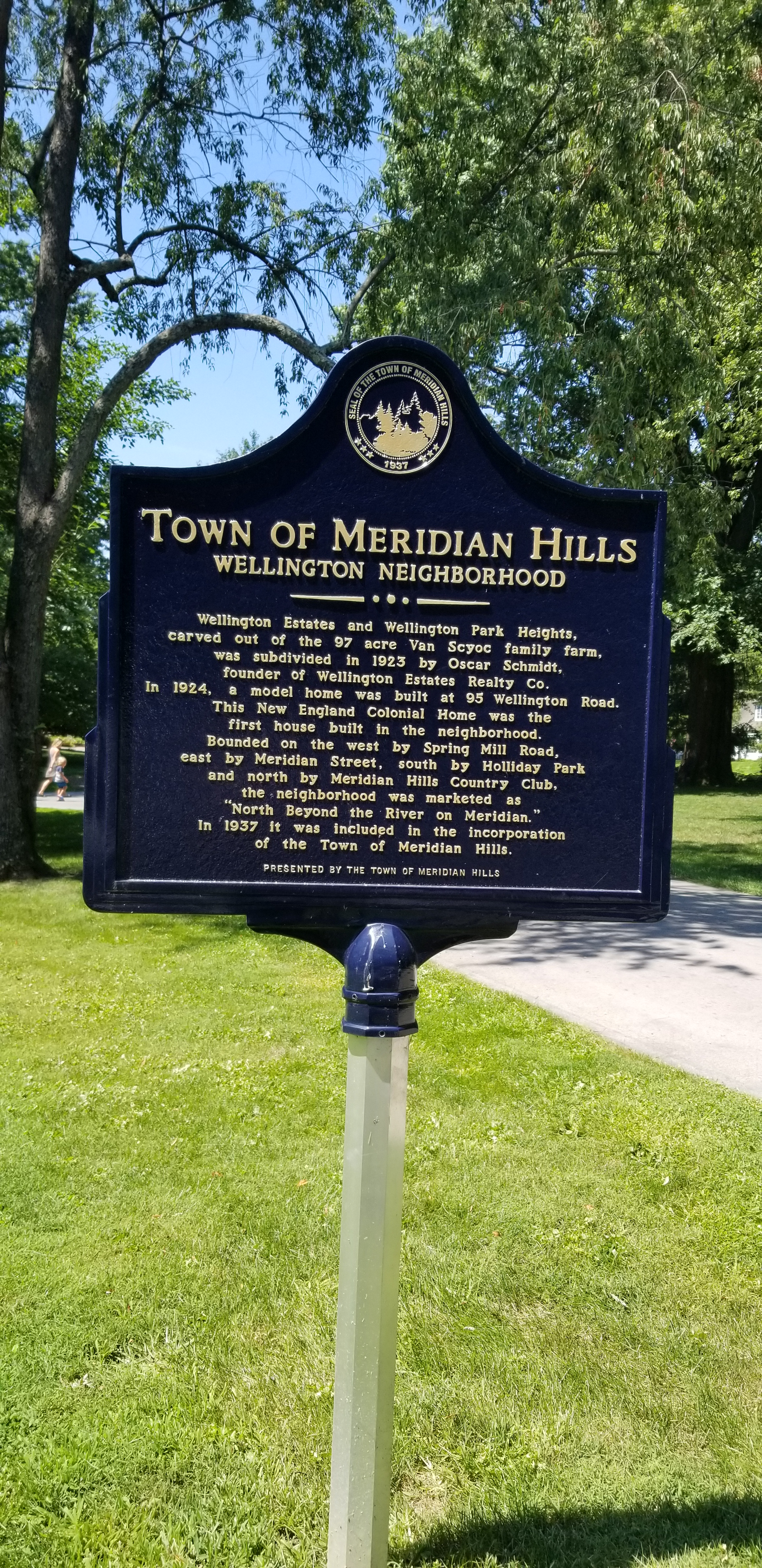

- Seal

- Location in Marion County, Indiana
- Coordinates: 39°52′53″N 86°09′27″W
- Country: United States
- State: Indiana
- County: Marion
- Township: Washington
- Incorporated: 1937
- Consolidated with Unigov: 1970

Area
  - Total: 1.47 sq mi (3.82 km^{2})
  - Land: 1.47 sq mi (3.82 km^{2})
  - Water: 0 sq mi (0.00 km^{2})
- Elevation: 778 ft (237 m)

Population (2020)
  - Total: 1,774
  - Density: 1,202.9/sq mi (464.45/km^{2})
- Time zone: UTC-5 (Eastern (EST))
  - Summer (DST): UTC-4 (EDT)
- ZIP codes: 46220, 46240, 46260
- Area codes: 317/463
- FIPS code: 18-48456
- GNIS feature ID: 2396752
- Website: www.meridianhills.org

Meridian Hills is a town in Washington Township, Marion County, Indiana, about 8 miles (13 km) north of downtown Indianapolis. It had a population of 1,774 at the 2020 census, up from 1,616 in 2010.

== History ==
Residential construction began in the town in the early 1920s, and Meridian Hills Country Club opened in 1923; however, the town did not incorporate until 1937. It has existed as an "included town" since 1970, when it was incorporated into Indianapolis as part of Unigov. It is part of Indianapolis, while still retaining a town government under IC 36-3-2-5. The town has the authority to levy taxes and pass ordinances, as well as appointing town police officers.

Meridian Hills remains a wooded residential enclave for the wealthy and upper-middle class.

== Geography ==
Meridian Hills is located in northern Marion County on high ground overlooking the White River to the southeast and its tributary, Williams Creek, to the northeast. North Meridian Street (former U.S. Route 31) is the main road through the town, leading due south to the center of Indianapolis and north 7 miles (11 km) to Carmel.

According to the U.S. Census Bureau, Meridian Hills has a total area of 1.48 square miles (3.83 km^{2}), all land.

== Demographics ==
Historical population
Census	Pop.	Note	%±
1950	708		—
1960	1,807		155.2%
1970	1,850		2.4%
1980	1,801		−2.6%
1990	1,728		−4.1%
2000	1,713		−0.9%
2010	1,616		−5.7%
2020	1,774		9.8%
U.S. Decennial Census

=== 2020 census ===
As of the 2020 census, Meridian Hills had a population of 1,774. The median age was 44.8 years. 25.5% of residents were under the age of 18 and 20.5% of residents were 65 years of age or older. For every 100 females there were 96.2 males, and for every 100 females age 18 and over there were 94.8 males age 18 and over.

100.0% of residents lived in urban areas, while 0.0% lived in rural areas.

There were 657 households in Meridian Hills, of which 37.1% had children under the age of 18 living in them. Of all households, 73.5% were married-couple households, 9.7% were households with a male householder and no spouse or partner present, and 14.2% were households with a female householder and no spouse or partner present. About 16.6% of all households were made up of individuals and 7.9% had someone living alone who was 65 years of age or older.

There were 694 housing units, of which 5.3% were vacant. The homeowner vacancy rate was 2.6% and the rental vacancy rate was 9.1%.

Racial composition as of the 2020 census
Race	Number	Percent
White	1,616	91.1%
Black or African American	39	2.2%
American Indian and Alaska Native	3	0.2%
Asian	38	2.1%
Native Hawaiian and Other Pacific Islander	0	0.0%
Some other race	12	0.7%
Two or more races	66	3.7%
Hispanic or Latino (of any race)	31	1.7%

=== 2010 census ===
As of the census of 2010, there were 1,616 people, 644 households, and 477 families living in the town. The population density was 1,091.9 inhabitants per square mile (421.6/km^{2}). There were 684 housing units at an average density of 462.2 per square mile (178.5/km^{2}). The racial makeup of the town was 95.9% White, 1.2% African American, 0.1% Native American, 1.1% Asian, 0.1% Pacific Islander, 0.4% from other races, and 1.2% from two or more races. Hispanic or Latino of any race were 1.7% of the population.

There were 644 households, of which 32.0% had children under the age of 18 living with them, 64.8% were married couples living together, 6.2% had a female householder with no husband present, 3.1% had a male householder with no wife present, and 25.9% were non-families. 20.8% of all households were made up of individuals, and 10.6% had someone living alone who was 65 years of age or older. The average household size was 2.51 and the average family size was 2.94.

The median age in the town was 47.8 years. 24.3% of residents were under the age of 18; 4.4% were between the ages of 18 and 24; 17.7% were from 25 to 44; 34.3% were from 45 to 64; and 19.3% were 65 years of age or older. The gender makeup of the town was 49.1% male and 50.9% female.

=== 2000 census ===
As of the census of 2000, there were 1,713 people, 657 households, and 509 families living in the town. The population density was 1,154.3 inhabitants per square mile (445.7/km^{2}). There were 677 housing units at an average density of 456.2 per square mile (176.1/km^{2}). The racial makeup of the town was 97.02% White, 1.58% African American, 0.76% Asian, 0.12% Pacific Islander, 0.06% from other races, and 0.47% from two or more races. Hispanic or Latino of any race were 0.82% of the population.

There were 657 households, out of which 33.8% had children under the age of 18 living with them, 72.0% were married couples living together, 4.0% had a female householder with no husband present, and 22.5% were non-families. 19.0% of all households were made up of individuals, and 10.4% had someone living alone who was 65 years of age or older. The average household size was 2.61 and the average family size was 3.01.

In the town, the population was spread out, with 27.0% under the age of 18, 3.0% from 18 to 24, 21.8% from 25 to 44, 30.5% from 45 to 64, and 17.6% who were 65 years of age or older. The median age was 44 years. For every 100 females, there were 95.5 males. For every 100 females age 18 and over, there were 96.9 males.

The median income for a household in the town was $107,009, and the median income for a family was $114,458. Males had a median income of $79,557 versus $56,304 for females. The per capita income for the town was $59,829. None of the families and 0.2% of the population were living below the poverty line, including no under eighteens and none of those over 64.

== Education ==
Almost all of Meridian Hills is in the Washington Township Metropolitan School District. One block is in Indianapolis Public Schools.

In regards to the Washington Township MSD portions: Zoned elementary schools with sections of Meridian Hills include: Fox Hill, Greenbriar, and Spring Mill. Middle schools with sections of Meridian Hills include: Northview and Westlane. North Central High School is the sole comprehensive high school of the Washington Township MSD.

A private school, Park Tudor School, is in Meridian Hills.

== See also ==
- List of cities surrounded by another city
- List of neighborhoods in Indianapolis
