= Marion County, Indiana =

County in Indiana, United States

- County
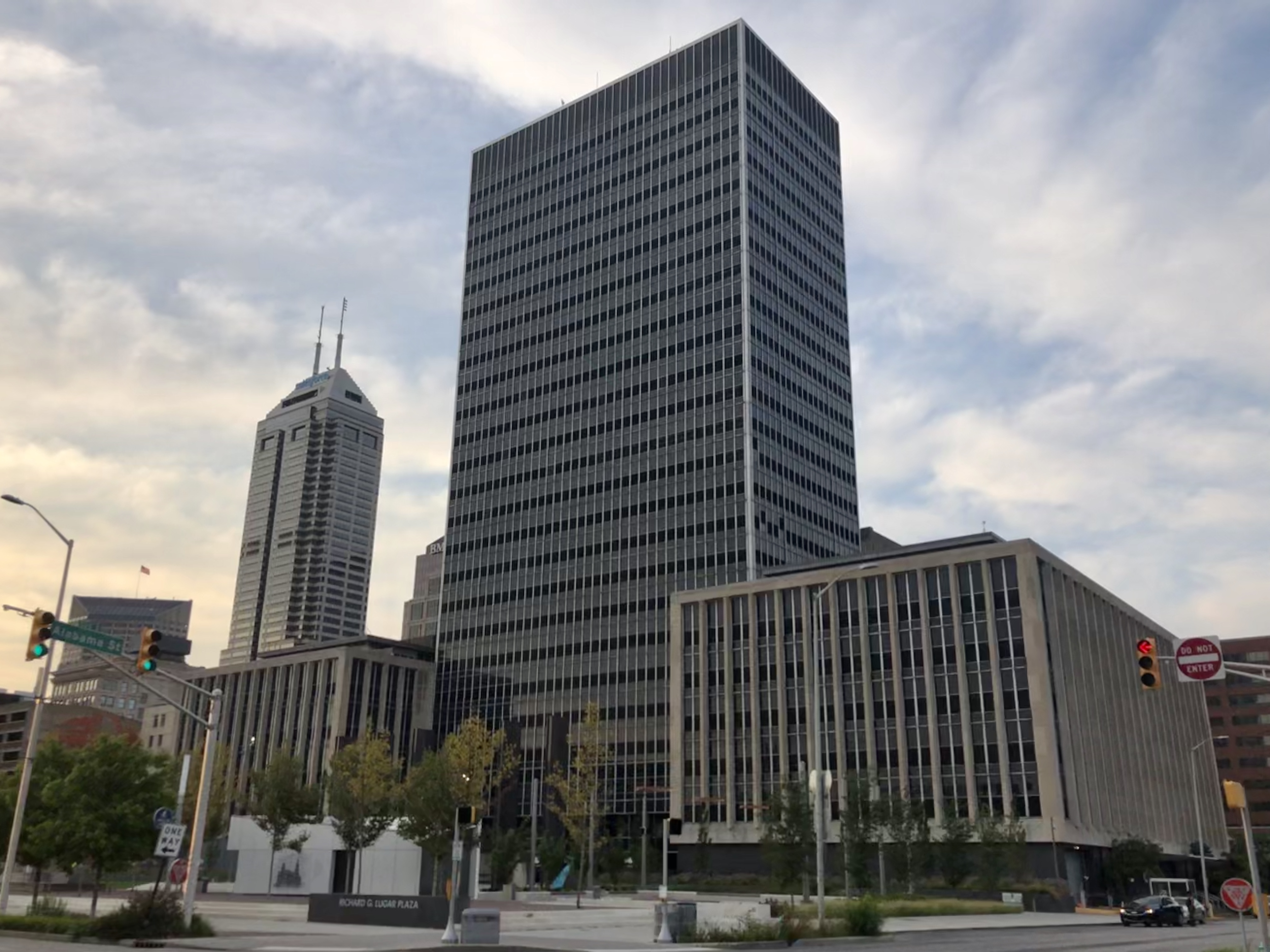
- The City-County Building in Indianapolis

- Location within the U.S. state of Indiana
- Coordinates: 39°47′N 86°08′W
- Country: United States
- State: Indiana
- Founded: April 1, 1822
- Named for: Francis Marion
- Seat: Indianapolis
- Largest city: Indianapolis

Area
  - Total: 403.01 sq mi (1,043.8 km^{2})
  - Land: 396.30 sq mi (1,026.4 km^{2})
  - Water: 6.71 sq mi (17.4 km^{2})

Population (2020)
  - Total: 977,203
  - Estimate (2025): 992,196 ▲
  - Density: 2,465.8/sq mi (952.06/km^{2})

GDP
  - Total: $135.593 billion (2024)
- Time zone: UTC−5 (Eastern)
  - Summer (DST): UTC−4 (EDT)
- Congressional districts: 6th, 7th
- Website: www.indy.gov
- Indiana county number 49; Most populous county in Indiana; Currently only Unigov county in Indiana

Marion County is located in the U.S. state of Indiana. The 2020 United States census reported a population of 977,203, making it the 54th-most populous county in the U.S., the most populous county in the state, and the main population center of the 11-county Indianapolis–Carmel–Greenwood MSA in central Indiana. Indianapolis is the county seat, the state capital, and most populous city. Marion County is consolidated with Indianapolis through an entity known as Unigov.

== Geography ==
The low rolling hills of Marion County have been cleared of trees, and the area is completely devoted to municipal development or to agriculture, except for wooded drainages. The highest point (920 feet/280 meters ASL) is a small ridge at the county's northwest corner.

According to the 2010 census, the county has an area of 403.01 square miles (1,043.8 km^{2}), of which 396.30 square miles (1,026.4 km^{2}) (or 98.34%) is land and 6.71 square miles (17.4 km^{2}) (or 1.66%) is water.

The White River flows southwestward through the central part of the county; it is joined by Eagle Creek and Fall Creek, both of which have dams in the county forming Eagle Creek Reservoir and Geist Reservoir, respectively.

Marion County has two Indiana State Parks, Fort Harrison State Park and White River State Park, as well as many municipal parks.

=== Adjacent counties ===
- Hamilton County - north
- Hancock County - east
- Shelby County - southeast
- Johnson County - south
- Morgan County - southwest
- Hendricks County - west
- Boone County - northwest

== History ==
Marion County was created on April 1, 1822, from part of the "New Purchase" lands that had been obtained from its inhabitants, the Lenape, by the Treaty of St. Mary's. It is named for Francis Marion, the Swamp Fox, a brigadier general from South Carolina in the American Revolutionary War.

The state capital was moved to Indianapolis in Marion County from Corydon on January 10, 1825. This began a period of rapid growth in population.

== Climate and weather ==
Indianapolis, Indiana

Climate chart (precipitation, max. and min. temperature)
J	F	M	A	M	J	J	A	S	O	N	D
3.1 36 21	2.4 41 24	3.7 52 34	4.3 64 43	4.8 73 54	5 82 63	4.4 86 66	3.2 84 65	3.1 78 57	3.2 66 46	3.5 52 35	2.9 40 26
- █ Average max. and min. temperatures in °F
- █ Precipitation totals in inches
- Source: The Weather Channel
Metric conversion
J	F	M	A	M	J	J	A	S	O	N	D
79 2 −6	62 5 −4	94 11 1	110 18 6	121 23 12	126 28 17	112 30 19	81 29 18	80 26 14	82 19 8	88 11 2	74 4 −3
- █ Average max. and min. temperatures in °C
- █ Precipitation totals in mm

In recent years, average temperatures in Indianapolis have ranged from a low of 20 °F (−7 °C) in January to a high of 86 °F (30 °C) in July, although a record low of −22 °F (−30 °C) was recorded in January 1985 and a record high of 104 °F (40 °C) was recorded in June 1988. Average monthly precipitation ranged from 2.05 inches (52 mm) in January to 4.78 inches (121 mm) in July.

== Demographics ==
Age and gender distribution in Marion County

Historical population
Census	Pop.	Note	%±
1830	7,192		—
1840	16,080		123.6%
1850	24,103		49.9%
1860	39,855		65.4%
1870	71,939		80.5%
1880	102,782		42.9%
1890	141,156		37.3%
1900	197,227		39.7%
1910	263,661		33.7%
1920	348,061		32.0%
1930	422,666		21.4%
1940	460,926		9.1%
1950	551,777		19.7%
1960	697,567		26.4%
1970	792,299		13.6%
1980	765,233		−3.4%
1990	797,159		4.2%
2000	860,454		7.9%
2010	903,393		5.0%
2020	977,203		8.2%
2025 (est.)	992,196	▲	1.5%
US Decennial Census; 1790-1960 1900–1990; 1990-2000

=== Racial and ethnic composition ===
Marion County, Indiana – Racial and ethnic composition Note: the US Census treats Hispanic/Latino as an ethnic category. This table excludes Latinos from the racial categories and assigns them to a separate category. Hispanics/Latinos may be of any race.
Race / Ethnicity (NH = Non-Hispanic)	Pop 1980	Pop 1990	Pop 2000	Pop 2010	Pop 2020	% 1980	% 1990	% 2000	% 2010	% 2020
White alone (NH)	597,232	610,180	592,540	537,905	493,665	78.05%	76.54%	68.86%	59.54%	50.52%
Black or African American alone (NH)	154,398	168,852	206,716	238,454	265,659	20.18%	21.18%	24.02%	26.40%	27.19%
Native American or Alaska Native alone (NH)	1,098	1,614	1,824	1,954	1,752	0.14%	0.20%	0.21%	0.22%	0.18%
Asian alone (NH)	4,260	7,349	12,198	18,119	39,827	0.56%	0.92%	1.42%	2.01%	4.08%
Native Hawaiian or Pacific Islander alone (NH)	x	x	308	333	374	x	x	0.04%	0.04%	0.04%
Other race alone (NH)	1,427	714	1,676	2,320	5,373	0.19%	0.09%	0.19%	0.26%	0.55%
Mixed race or Multiracial (NH)	x	x	11,902	19,842	41,267	x	x	1.38%	2.20%	4.22%
Hispanic or Latino (any race)	6,818	8,450	33,290	84,466	129,286	0.89%	1.06%	3.87%	9.35%	13.23%
Total	765,233	797,159	860,454	903,393	977,203	100.00%	100.00%	100.00%	100.00%	100.00%

=== 2020 census ===
As of the 2020 census, the county had a population of 977,203. The median age was 34.7 years. 24.0% of residents were under the age of 18 and 12.9% of residents were 65 years of age or older. For every 100 females there were 94.0 males, and for every 100 females age 18 and over there were 90.9 males age 18 and over.

The racial makeup of the county was 52.5% White, 27.5% Black or African American, 0.5% American Indian and Alaska Native, 4.1% Asian, <0.1% Native Hawaiian and Pacific Islander, 7.7% from some other race, and 7.6% from two or more races. Hispanic or Latino residents of any race comprised 13.2% of the population.

99.1% of residents lived in urban areas, while 0.9% lived in rural areas.

There were 398,062 households in the county, of which 30.0% had children under the age of 18 living in them. Of all households, 35.5% were married-couple households, 22.4% were households with a male householder and no spouse or partner present, and 33.3% were households with a female householder and no spouse or partner present. About 32.7% of all households were made up of individuals and 9.9% had someone living alone who was 65 years of age or older.

There were 436,998 housing units, of which 8.9% were vacant. Among occupied housing units, 52.9% were owner-occupied and 47.1% were renter-occupied. The homeowner vacancy rate was 1.7% and the rental vacancy rate was 10.3%.

=== 2010 census ===
As of the 2010 U.S. census, there were 903,393 people, 366,176 households, and 218,338 families in the county. The population density was 2,279.6 inhabitants per square mile (880.2/km^{2}). There were 417,862 housing units at an average density of 1,054.4 per square mile (407.1/km^{2}). The racial makeup of the county was 62.7% white, 26.7% black or African American, 2.0% Asian, 0.3% American Indian, 0.1% Pacific islander, 5.4% from other races, and 2.8% from two or more races. Those of Hispanic or Latino origin made up 9.3% of the population. In terms of ancestry, 18.9% were German, 11.8% were Irish, 8.4% were English, 6.6% were American, and 5.2% were Subsaharan African.

Of the 366,176 households, 32.3% had children under the age of 18 living with them, 36.9% were married couples living together, 17.1% had a female householder with no husband present, 40.4% were non-families, and 32.0% of all households were made up of individuals. The average household size was 2.42 and the average family size was 3.08. The median age was 33.9 years.

The median income for a household in the county was $47,697 and the median income for a family was $54,142. Males had a median income of $42,215 versus $34,169 for females. The per capita income for the county was $24,498. About 13.5% of families and 17.3% of the population were below the poverty line, including 25.7% of those under age 18 and 9.0% of those age 65 or over.

== Cities and towns ==
Marion County has a consolidated city-county government, known as Unigov, in which only four municipalities retain full government autonomy (including a mayor and city council) as "excluded cities". The remaining municipalities within the county are "included towns" and exercise very limited authority, mainly in zoning and appointing their own police departments and maintaining some of their own municipal services and town identities. They retain the ability to levy taxes for these purposes.

=== Municipalities ===
- Indianapolis

==== Excluded cities and town ====
- Beech Grove
- Lawrence
- Southport
- Speedway

==== Included towns ====
- Clermont
- Crows Nest
- Cumberland (western portion)
- Homecroft
- Meridian Hills
- North Crows Nest
- Rocky Ripple
- Spring Hill
- Warren Park
- Williams Creek
- Wynnedale

=== Townships ===
Marion County has nine townships roughly organized into a grid-like, three-by-three pattern. This arrangement can be seen below, with the top being north.

Pike	Washington	Lawrence
Wayne	Center	Warren
Decatur	Perry	Franklin

== Politics ==
The northern two-thirds of Marion County is in Indiana's 7th congressional district, which is held by Democrat André Carson. Indiana's 6th congressional district, which runs along the southern third of the county, is held by Republican Jefferson Shreve. The county is represented by 15 seats in the Indiana House of Representatives, 86th through 100th districts, with ten seats held by Democrats and five by Republicans. In the State Senate Marion County is divided among nine districts, which are held by two Democrats and seven Republicans. The Senate districts are numbered 28 through 36.

The Indianapolis City-County Council is the combined legislative body of Indianapolis and Marion County. The consolidated government, known as Unigov, was formally established in 1970 upon the merger of the city government with the county government. The council passes ordinances for the city and county, and makes appointments to certain boards and commissions.

County elected officials

- Mayor (County Executive): Joe Hogsett (D)
- Auditor: Myla A. Eldrige (D)
- Clerk: Kate Sweeney Bell (D)
- Coroner: Alfarena (Alfie) McGinty (D)
- Assessor: Joseph P. O'Connor (D)
- Prosecutor: Ryan Mears (D)
- Recorder: Faith Kimbrough (D)
- Sheriff: Kerry J. Forestal (D)
- Surveyor: Debra S. Jenkins (D)
- Treasurer: Barbara A. Lawrence (D)

The Auditor, Assessor, and Treasurer form the county's Board of Commissioners.

For most of the 20th century, Marion County was considered one of the most conservative urban counties in the nation. Between 1896 and 2000, it went Democratic only four times, in the national landslides of 1932, 1936 and 1964 as well as 1912 when Woodrow Wilson won a plurality in the county. The Republican edge narrowed considerably in the 1990s, and in 2004 John Kerry became the first Democrat since Lyndon B. Johnson in 1964 to carry the county. The trend continued in 2008 and 2012 with Barack Obama showing strongly in Marion County, winning 63% and 60% of the vote respectively. In the former case, Obama's showing in the county was enough to deliver Indiana to the Democrats for the first time since 1964, while John McCain became the first Republican since 1912 to win less than 40 percent of the county's vote. Hillary Clinton won it with 58 percent in 2016, and Joe Biden took 63 percent in 2020. Biden's 247,772 votes is the highest number of votes a candidate has ever received in the county. It is now one of the few Democratic bastions in traditionally heavily Republican central Indiana, and in the 2020 and 2024 elections, it was the most Democratic county in the entire state.

The six northern and central townships lean more Democratic, especially Center Township containing Downtown Indianapolis, and Pike Township in the northwestern corner with an African-American majority. In contrast, the three less populated southern townships with a higher Caucasian population (Decatur, Perry and Franklin) lean more Republican.

United States presidential election results for Marion County, Indiana
Year	Republican		Democratic		Third party(ies)	
Year	No.	%	No.	%	No.	%
1888	17,139	48.82%	17,515	49.89%	456	1.30%
1892	19,551	47.77%	20,426	49.91%	949	2.32%
1896	27,353	55.98%	20,654	42.27%	853	1.75%
1900	29,272	54.24%	23,660	43.84%	1,034	1.92%
1904	35,103	58.54%	22,336	37.25%	2,524	4.21%
1908	34,351	48.67%	34,078	48.28%	2,151	3.05%
1912	12,280	18.22%	29,805	44.22%	25,323	37.57%
1916	40,699	51.50%	35,043	44.34%	3,288	4.16%
1920	79,957	54.93%	61,460	42.22%	4,154	2.85%
1924	95,135	59.13%	59,498	36.98%	6,247	3.88%
1928	109,630	59.55%	73,309	39.82%	1,161	0.63%
1932	98,256	46.20%	106,661	50.15%	7,747	3.64%
1936	87,798	40.54%	124,961	57.71%	3,791	1.75%
1940	124,845	50.43%	121,907	49.25%	787	0.32%
1944	116,421	52.01%	106,382	47.53%	1,034	0.46%
1948	103,603	50.78%	97,915	47.99%	2,495	1.22%
1952	164,466	60.48%	106,387	39.12%	1,086	0.40%
1956	162,566	61.97%	99,102	37.78%	679	0.26%
1960	166,202	57.67%	121,336	42.10%	668	0.23%
1964	143,015	48.25%	152,418	51.43%	948	0.32%
1968	162,503	52.26%	115,715	37.22%	32,704	10.52%
1972	206,065	66.52%	102,166	32.98%	1,535	0.50%
1976	177,767	54.60%	145,274	44.62%	2,535	0.78%
1980	168,680	53.67%	126,103	40.13%	19,486	6.20%
1984	184,880	58.29%	130,185	41.05%	2,083	0.66%
1988	184,519	58.56%	128,627	40.82%	1,949	0.62%
1992	141,369	43.66%	122,234	37.75%	60,187	18.59%
1996	133,329	47.24%	124,448	44.10%	24,437	8.66%
2000	137,810	49.23%	134,189	47.94%	7,904	2.82%
2004	156,072	48.65%	162,249	50.57%	2,517	0.78%
2008	134,313	35.34%	241,987	63.67%	3,790	1.00%
2012	136,509	37.92%	216,336	60.10%	7,127	1.98%
2016	130,360	35.53%	212,899	58.03%	23,620	6.44%
2020	134,175	34.30%	247,772	63.35%	9,187	2.35%
2024	124,327	35.08%	221,719	62.57%	8,322	2.35%

== Education ==
School districts include:

- Beech Grove City Schools
- Decatur Township Metropolitan School District
- Franklin Township Community School Corporation
- Indianapolis Public Schools
- Lawrence Township Metropolitan School District
- Perry Township Schools
- Pike Township Metropolitan School District
- Speedway School Town
- Warren Township Metropolitan School District
- Washington Township Metropolitan School District
- Wayne Township Metropolitan School District

It also has the following state-operated schools:

- Indiana School for the Blind and Visually Impaired
- Indiana School for the Deaf

== Transportation ==
=== Major highways ===
- I-65
- I-69
- I-70
- I-74
- I-465
- US 31
- US 36
- US 40
- US 52
- US 136
- US 421
- SR 67
- SR 134
- SR 135

=== Transit ===
- Central Indiana Regional Transportation Authority
- IndyGo (Red Line • Purple Line)
- Indianapolis Union Station
- Amtrak (Cardinal)
- Barons Bus Lines
- Burlington Trailways
- Flixbus
- Greyhound Lines
- Miller Transportation

=== Airports ===
- Indianapolis International Airport (KIND)
- Eagle Creek Airpark (KEYE)
- Post-Air Airport

== See also ==
- Marion County Fair (Indiana)
- List of counties in Indiana
- List of places named for Francis Marion
- List of the most populous counties in the United States
