= Metropolitan School District of Washington Township =

School district in Marion County, Indiana, US

Coordinates: 39°54′N 86°9′W

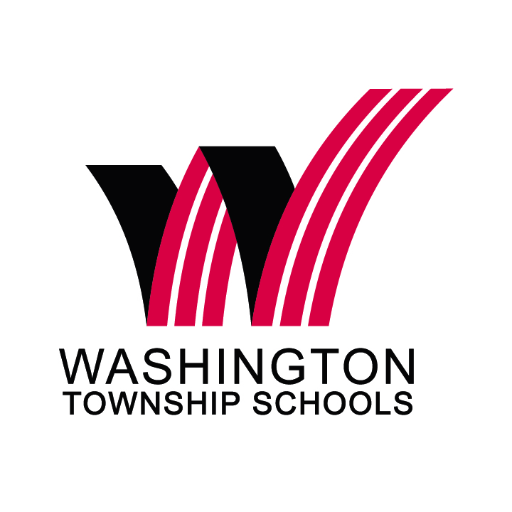
- MSD Washington Township's Logo as of 2018
- 8550 Woodfield Crossing Blvd, Indianapolis, IN 46240

District information
- Type: Public
- Grades: Pre-K through 12
- Established: 1955
- Superintendent: Dr. Nikki C. Woodson
- Asst. superintendent(s): Dr. Sean Taylor
- School board: 5 members
- Chair of the board: Mr. Donald B. Kite, Jr.
- Governing agency: Indiana Department of Education
- Schools: Preschool 1, Elementary 8, Middle 3, High 1, Career Center 1

Students and staff
- Students: 10,969
- Teachers: 672
- Staff: 1,600
- Student–teacher ratio: 16:1

The Metropolitan School District of Washington Township (MSDWT) is a public school district located in the northern section of Indianapolis, Indiana , and Marion County. The district was established in 1955 and serves the area of Washington Township that was outside the city limits before the city and county were merged in 1970. As of 2016–17, MSDWT had approximately 11,482 students in grades K–12.

The district includes Crows Nest, Meridian Hills, Rocky Ripple, Spring Hill, and Wynnedale.

== Schools ==
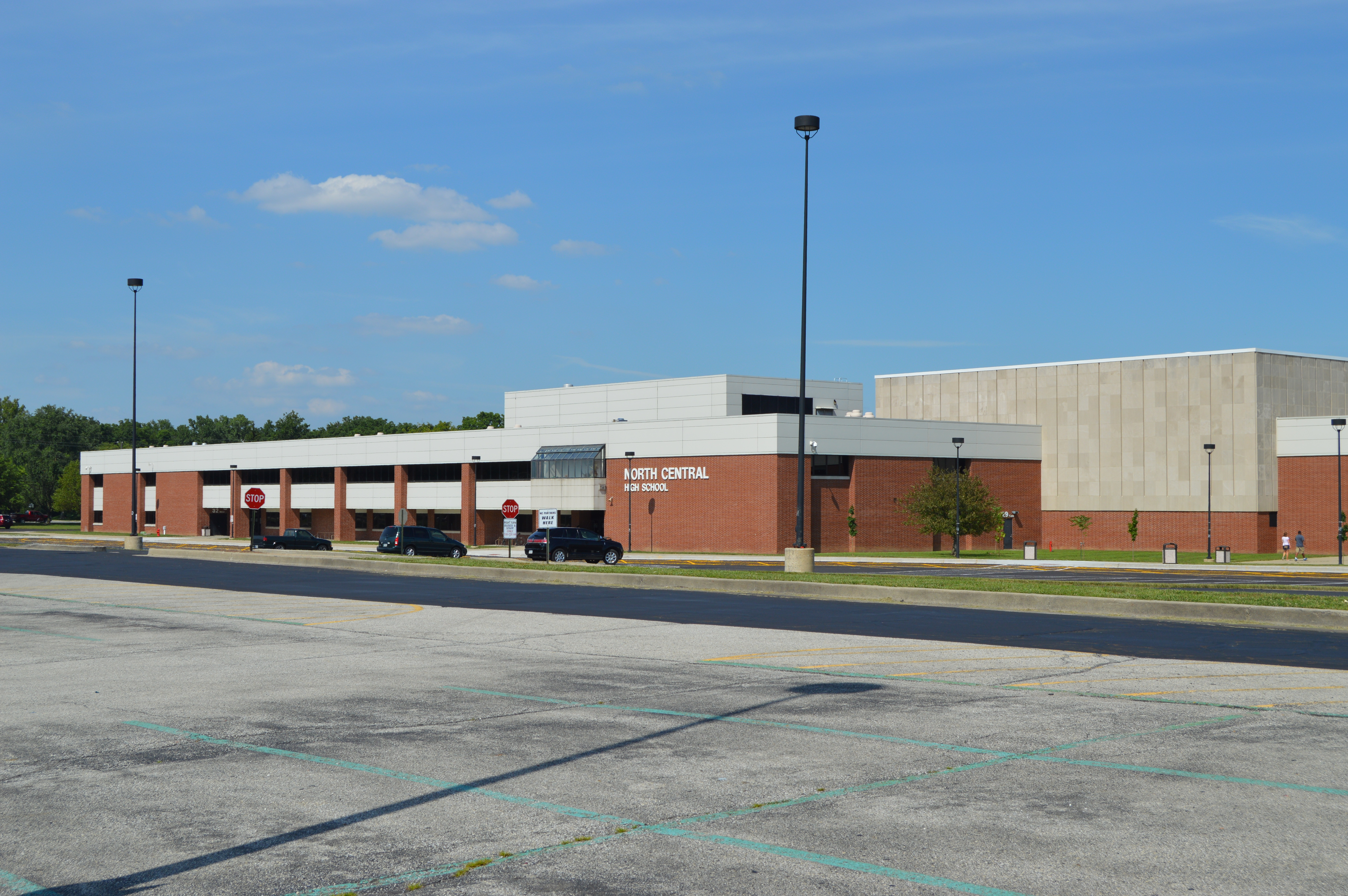
North Central High School

High school

- North Central High School

Middle schools

- Eastwood Middle School
- Northview Middle School
- Westlane Middle School

Elementary schools

- Allisonville Elementary School
- Clearwater Elementary School
- Crooked Creek Elementary School
- Fox Hill Elementary School
- Greenbriar Elementary School
- Nora Elementary School
- Spring Mill Elementary School
- Willow Lake Elementary

Career center

- J. Everett Light Career Center

Early childhood development

- Wyandotte School closed at the beginning of the 2008-2009 School Year
- Harcourt Elementary school closed at the 2008-2009 year

=== Wyandotte School ===
Wyandotte is located at 3575 E. 79th Street, Indianapolis, IN 46240. Wyandotte is a Pre-K and K elementary school. Wyandotte is responsible for the kindergarten population for Allisonville and John Strange elementary schools. Full day kindergarten is available; however, it is tuition based. As of 2005–06, the annual tuition was approximately $2,300 for full day kindergarten. Half day kindergarten is paid for by the state. Approximately 50% of the kindergarten enrollment attend full day classes.

Further programs include AYS. AYS program handles Pre-K (3–5) children in a structured early childhood development program. AYS also provides before school and after-school care for half and full day kindergarten students. AYS programs are provided at extra cost.

The Early Childhood Special Education Preschool is housed at Wyandotte School as part of the public school system. It is developed for children ages three to five with identified special needs.

The Wyandotte Youth Support Academy, which is funded by Lilly Endowment, offers elementary, middle school students, and parents an educational alternative to out-of-school suspension. W.Y.S.A. provides the students with education in character values, individualized instruction, and computer based education. W.Y.S.A. is designed to reduce the numbers of out-of-school suspensions, and to improve overall student achievement while addressing student disciplinary problems.

Because of budgetary constraints, Wyandotte may be closed at the end of the 07/08 school year. The kindergarten students, for Allisonville and John Strange, will attend school at John Strange for the next few years. Johnathan Strange has been under capacity for over four years. The strategic plan is to have all kindergarten students, after physical additions and remodeling work is completed, attend their home elementary. This plan depends on future funding being approved by the school board and the citizens of the school district.

== See also ==
- List of school districts in Indiana
