= Unigov =

Consolidated government in Indiana, U.S.

Modern Indianapolis overlapped by pre-Unigov Indianapolis (note: some then independent enclaves are included in pre-Unigov Indianapolis)

Unigov is the colloquial name adopted by the city of Indianapolis, Indiana, United States, to describe its consolidated city–county government. By an act of the Indiana General Assembly, Indianapolis consolidated with the government of Marion County in 1970.

Within Unigov are eleven "included towns". Under Indiana Code 36-3-1-4 sec. 4(a)(2)), included towns retain their identity as towns under Indiana law and have some limited autonomy. However, they are legally part of the Consolidated City of Indianapolis and are fully subject to the laws and control of the government of Indianapolis. Four other municipalities in Marion County are not part of the Indianapolis government ("excluded cities and towns"), but receive county-level services from Unigov and take part in elections for the Indianapolis City–County Council and mayor.

The area of Marion County not within the included or excluded towns, but including what was the City of Indianapolis prior to the enactment of Unigov, is designated by the U.S. Census Bureau as the "balance", and its population is usually quoted as the population of Indianapolis for census purposes.

== Background ==
Indianapolis was intentionally surveyed and founded as the capital of the U.S. state of Indiana. Given the condition of urban planning in 1821, little thought was given to the growth of the city. Original planners were of the opinion that it would never grow beyond its original square mile (2.6 km^{2}) layout (still known as "the Mile Square"). Contrary to their belief, Marion County soon was filled with small communities with connections to Indianapolis, or with businesses that had formed to take advantage of Indianapolis's location midway between Lake Michigan and both Cincinnati, Ohio, and Louisville, Kentucky. City growth occurred in fits and starts. By the late 1960s, it was possible in some areas to leave and re-enter Indianapolis while traveling in a straight line. The movement of affluent citizens to more fashionable suburbs, especially to the north of the city limits, accelerated into full white flight in the period after World War II. While this sprawl was generally within Marion County, it hastened the decay of the city itself.

Unigov was proposed in the late 1960s by then mayor (and later U.S. Senator) Richard Lugar to address these problems and a number of other related issues. In order to support Unigov, a compromise was arranged. The cities of Beech Grove, Lawrence, and Southport, and the town of Speedway each maintained limited autonomy, with their own police forces, school systems, and mayors (except Speedway). In addition, fire service and school districts were maintained at their pre-Unigov borders, and some of the included towns retained independent police forces. Nevertheless, the excluded cities are also part of the consolidated city-county government and are thus represented within the City-County Council. In addition to voting for the mayors and councils of their respective cities and towns, residents are also able to vote for the mayor of Indianapolis, and a district City-County Council member, and, until those positions were abolished by the General Assembly, four at-large council members. A number of services and governmental responsibilities, including road maintenance, natural resource management, zoning, and flood control, are delegated by the state of Indiana to county-level government; As a result, residents of the excluded cities are obligated to pay county-wide taxes, and the powers of the mayor of Indianapolis extend to all of Marion County.

== Included towns ==
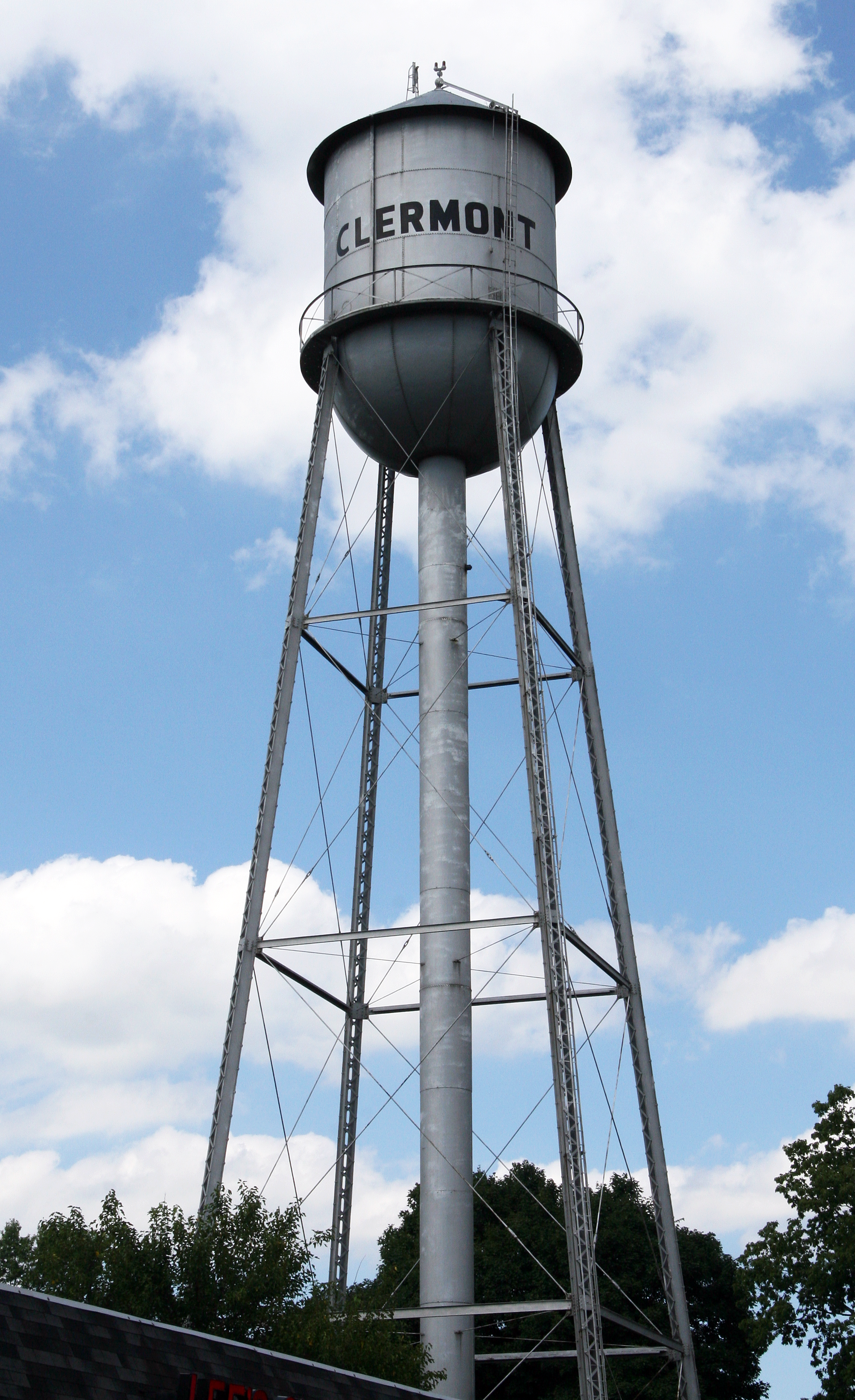
Clermont is located on Indianapolis's northwest side. It is an example of an included town.

Several towns that existed outside the city limits were incorporated into Unigov, but elected to retain some measure of autonomy. Most of these towns hold elections for Town Council and Clerk-Treasurer. The town governments have taxing authority, and several continue to appoint their own police departments, maintain their own streets, and perform various other functions independently of the city of Indianapolis. However, they cannot pass any ordinance that conflicts with, or permits a lesser standard than, any City-County ordinance. The included towns are:

- Clermont
- Crows Nest
- Homecroft
- Meridian Hills
- North Crows Nest
- Rocky Ripple
- Spring Hill
- Warren Park
- Williams Creek
- Wynnedale

Cumberland is divided between Marion County and Hancock County. While Cumberland has full governmental autonomy on the Hancock County side of town, it is an included town under Unigov on the Marion County side. For purposes such as rezoning in the portion in Marion County, Indianapolis officials have final say over policy. Beginning on Jan. 1, 2027, Cumberland will become an excluded city within Marion County.

== Excluded cities and town ==
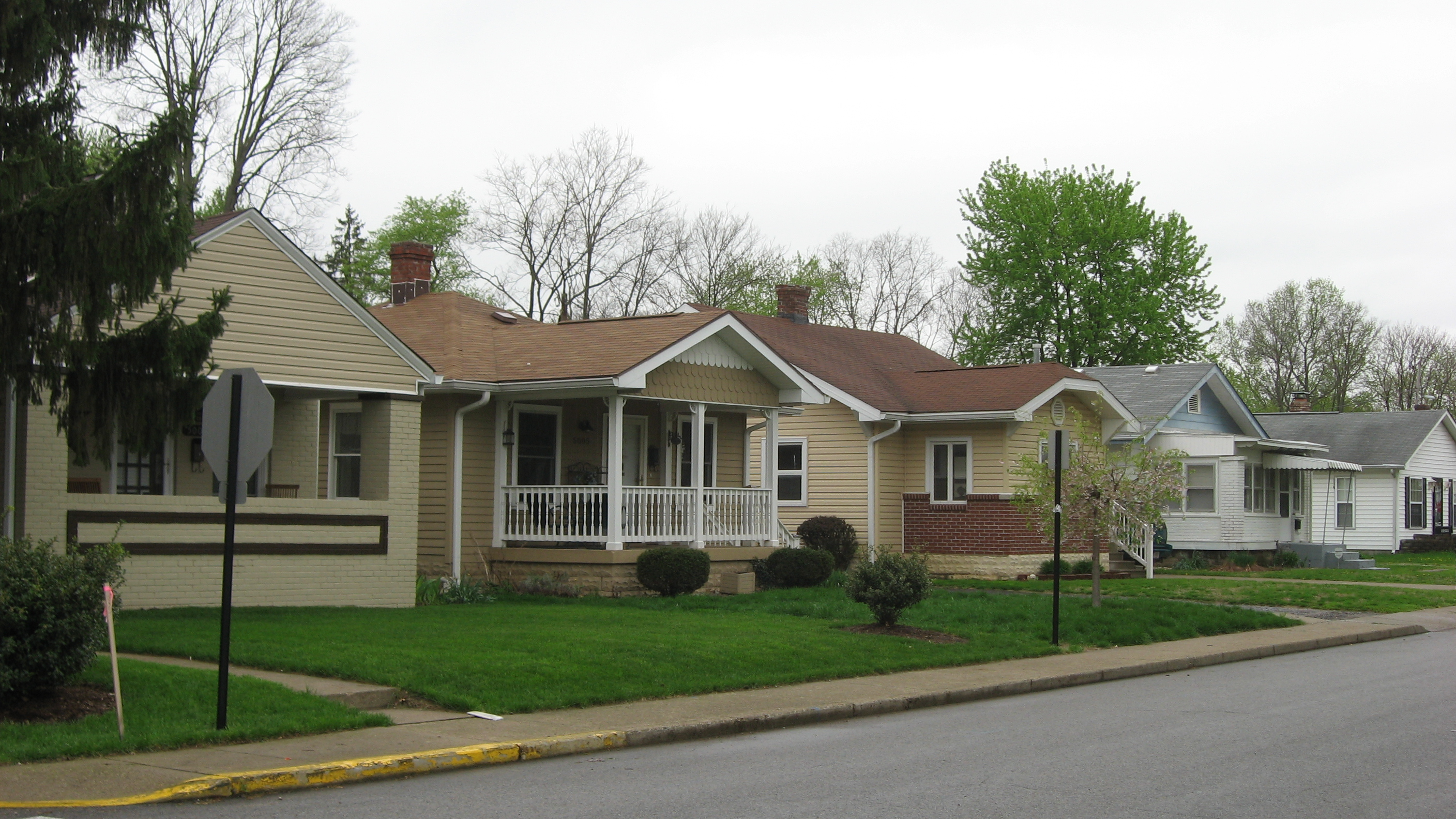
Speedway, an enclave of Indianapolis, is an example of an excluded city.

The cities of Beech Grove, Lawrence, and Southport, and the town of Speedway are known as "excluded cities", and retain government autonomy in most respects. They elect their own city officials and city councils. Residents also are represented on the City-County Council and vote for the mayor of Indianapolis because these countywide officials have taxing and other powers over the whole county.

== Political implications ==
For many years, the incorporation of the city's suburbs was seen as working to the political benefit of the Republican Party, which held the mayor's office from the election of Richard Lugar in 1967 until the election of Democrat Bart Peterson in 1999. Democrats gained a one-seat majority on the City-County Council for the first time in citywide elections in 2003.

Facing a budget crisis, Peterson made a proposal to further consolidate city and county functions, dubbed "Indianapolis Works!". He claimed it would eliminate remaining duplication, while opponents saw it as an effort to further consolidate the power of the Democratic Party in Marion County. The extension of city government was now seen as benefiting the Democrats, who had made many gains (as they did nationally) in the inner-ring suburbs, many more of which are included within the boundaries of the city than in many comparable metropolitan areas.

In December 2005, the City-County Council approved a merger of the Indianapolis Police Department and the Marion County Sheriff's Department, creating the Indianapolis Metropolitan Police Department, headed by the Marion County Sheriff.

In the 2007 municipal elections, the Republican party, led by Gregory A. Ballard, recaptured the Mayor's office and also won back a majority of the City-County Council. One of the planks of Ballard's campaign platform was that the police department needed to be under the responsibility of the mayor, and not the sheriff. In February 2008, the new GOP-led council gave the authority over the Indianapolis Metropolitan Police Department to the mayor, leaving Sheriff Frank J. Anderson with authority over the county jail, protection of City-County buildings and the traditional roles of tax collection and paper serving, but left him as the only sheriff in Indiana without territory to protect.

Democrats won all four citywide council seats for the first time in the 2011 election (and a majority for the second time), prompting Republicans in the Indiana General Assembly to eliminate the at-large seats for the 2015 election.

=== Other city–county consolidations ===
Under the Unigov provision of Indiana law, city-county consolidation is automatic when a city's population exceeds the threshold for qualification as a so-called First Class City. When the Unigov provision was enacted, the First Class City population threshold was 250,000. Indianapolis had a population of over 500,000 people in 1970, more than double the threshold. The next most populous city was Fort Wayne with a population of 174,000; as such, Indianapolis was the only city affected by the legislation.

By 2006, Fort Wayne nearly met the threshold for designation as a First Class City as it annexed the populous portions of Aboite Township. However, a pre-emptive legislative change in 2004 raised the population requirements for a First Class City from 250,000 to 600,000, which ensured Indianapolis's status as the only First Class City in Indiana. As a result, any foreseeable city-county consolidation in Indiana will be voluntary rather than automatic.

== Legacy and criticisms ==
Unigov has been praised for its economic impact but has received criticism for both its initial enactment and later impacts on communities – especially on African Americans and those living within pre-Unigov Indianapolis.

Unigov was never put up for a direct referendum. This has led critics during its enactment and thereafter to call the process undemocratic. The closest Indianapolis got to a referendum was the 1967 Indianapolis mayoral election, which Lugar narrowly won.

Due to public push back and lack of political appetite, Unigov left many government services as is and did not integrate them. Most notably, the school districts were not merged. While some services like police were later combined, school districts have remained unmerged. Lugar later said he knew that the Unigov bill would not pass in the Indiana General Assembly if schools were included, but that the merger was worth it despite the impact on schools. The impact on Indianapolis Public Schools (IPS) in particular contributed to declines in enrollment and funding over many decades.

African Americans lost substantial political clout following the merger, dropping from 23% of the population to 16%. For decades following the merger, the suburban populations that were added politically dominated Indianapolis. The decline of the IPS heavily affected African American students, who saw negative impacts from falling enrollments and funding to neighboring school districts outside the largely pre-Unigov IPS school district.

The economic impact has received more praise. The consolidated city has a much larger population, tax base, and overall economy. Indianapolis saw substantially less decline than many other cities in the Rust Belt due to deindustrialization, though manufacturing still declined. The city also saw more economic and population growth than comparable cities in the region starting in the 1980s.

Unigov, alongside later developments such as the Baltimore Colts relocation to Indianapolis, contributed to Indianapolis losing the "Naptown" reputation it had developed previously.
