= Poplar Grove, Indiana =

Poplar Grove may refer to:

- Poplar Grove, Howard County, Indiana, an unincorporated community
- Poplar Grove, Indianapolis, a neighborhood of Indianapolis
