= Poplar Grove =

Poplar Grove may refer to places in the United States and elsewhere:

== Settlements ==
- Poplar Grove, Illinois
- Poplar Grove Township, Boone County, Illinois
- Poplar Grove, Howard County, Indiana
- Poplar Grove, Indianapolis, a neighborhood of Indianapolis
- Poplar Grove Township, Roseau County, Minnesota
- Poplar Grove, Salt Lake City, Utah

== Other places ==
- Poplar Grove (Lexington, Kentucky), listed on the NRHP in Fayette County, Kentucky
- Poplar Grove Plantation (Louisiana)
- Poplar Grove (Scotts Hill, North Carolina), or Poplar Grove Plantation
- Poplar Grove National Cemetery, Petersburg, Virginia
- Poplar Grove Mill and House, Williams, Virginia
- Poplar Grove, battle location on the Modder River, South Africa, about ten miles upstream of Paardeberg.
- Poplar Grove, Andrew Jackson's home near Nashville, Tennessee, 1792–1797

== See also ==
- Battle of Poplar Grove (1900), a battle of the Second Boer War
- Poplar (disambiguation)
- Poplar Forest, a historic home once owned by Thomas Jefferson, in Forest, Virginia, U.S.
