= 1963 Indiana State Fairgrounds Coliseum gas explosion =

Mass casualty event in Indianapolis

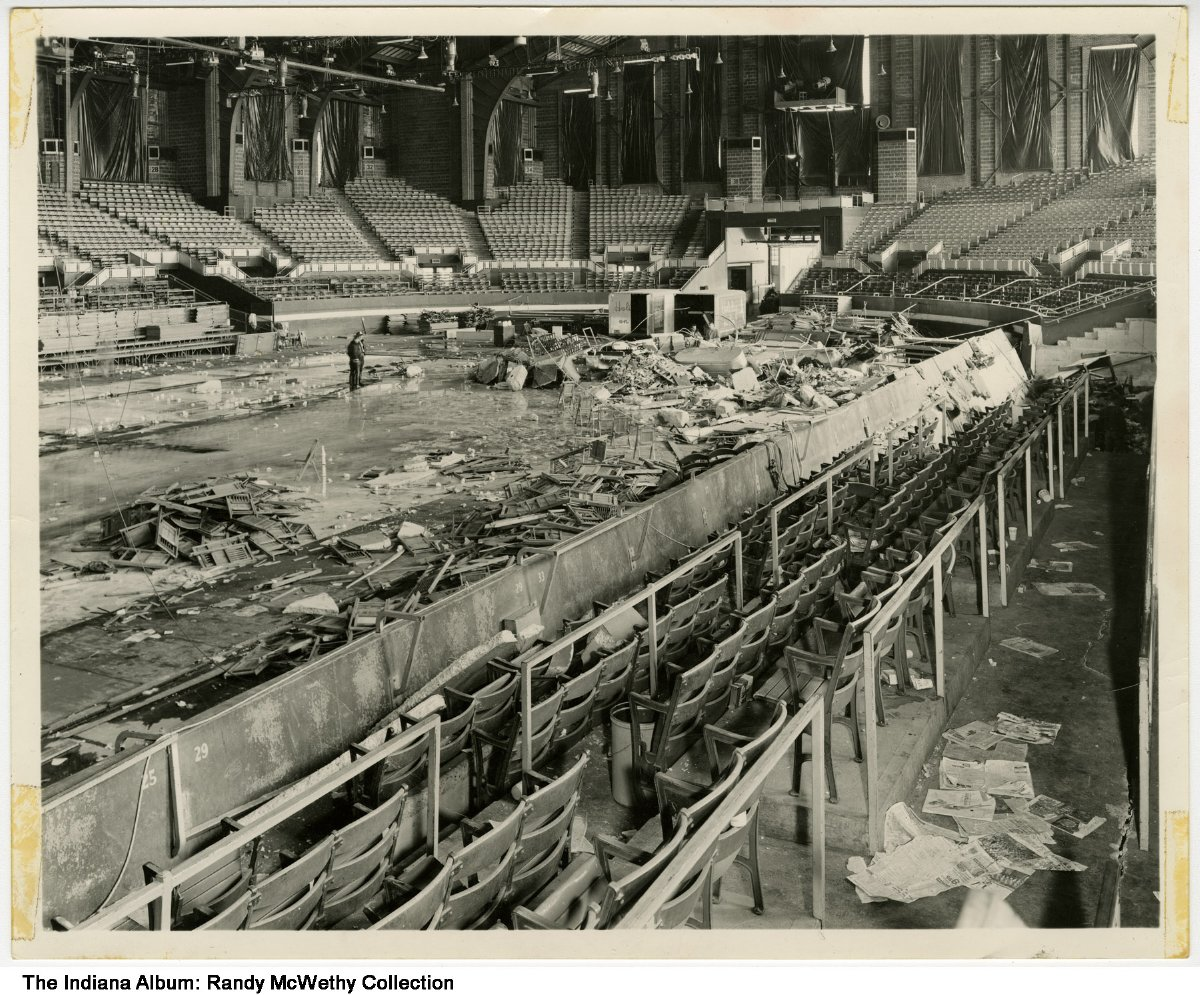
- Aftermath of the gas explosion with stacks of chairs and debris near the bleachers.
- Date: October 31, 1963
- Time: 11:06 p.m. (Eastern Time Zone)
- Location: Indiana State Fairgrounds Coliseum, Indianapolis, Indiana, U.S.; 39°49′39″N 86°8′6″W
- Type: Gas explosion
- Cause: Gas leak
- Deaths: 81
- Injuries: ~400

On October 31, 1963, a gas explosion occurred at the Indiana State Fairgrounds Coliseum in Indianapolis, United States, killing 81 people and injuring about 400 others. It was one of the worst disasters in the history of the state.

On the night of October 31, over 4,000 people were in the coliseum to watch a Holiday on Ice performance. While this was happening, liquefied petroleum gas was leaking from a tank that was stored with several others in a supply room underneath a part of the grandstands. Shortly after 11 p.m. ET, the gas came into contact with an electrical heating element from the concessions area, causing a major explosion that killed many seated above the room and caused significant damage to the stands. After the initial blast, while people were evacuating, a second blast caused by the remaining, unexploded tanks resulted in further destruction. Firefighters and other emergency responders were at the site within minutes and survivors were transported via ambulance to various hospitals in the area. The gas tanks were discovered by firefighters during cleanup operations and later testing revealed that they were the cause of the explosion.

Following the disaster, a grand jury indicted seven people in total, including employees of the gas provider and the company that operated the arena, as well as the state fire marshal and the city fire chief. However, at later dates all of the individuals either had their charges dropped or their convictions overturned. Victims of the explosion were eventually awarded $4.6 million in settlements. Several city and state agencies investigated the explosion, and it was one of the first events studied by the Disaster Research Center, a research group organized earlier that year to study large-scale disasters. The arena reopened about six weeks after the incident and still stands on the Indiana State Fairgrounds.

== Background ==
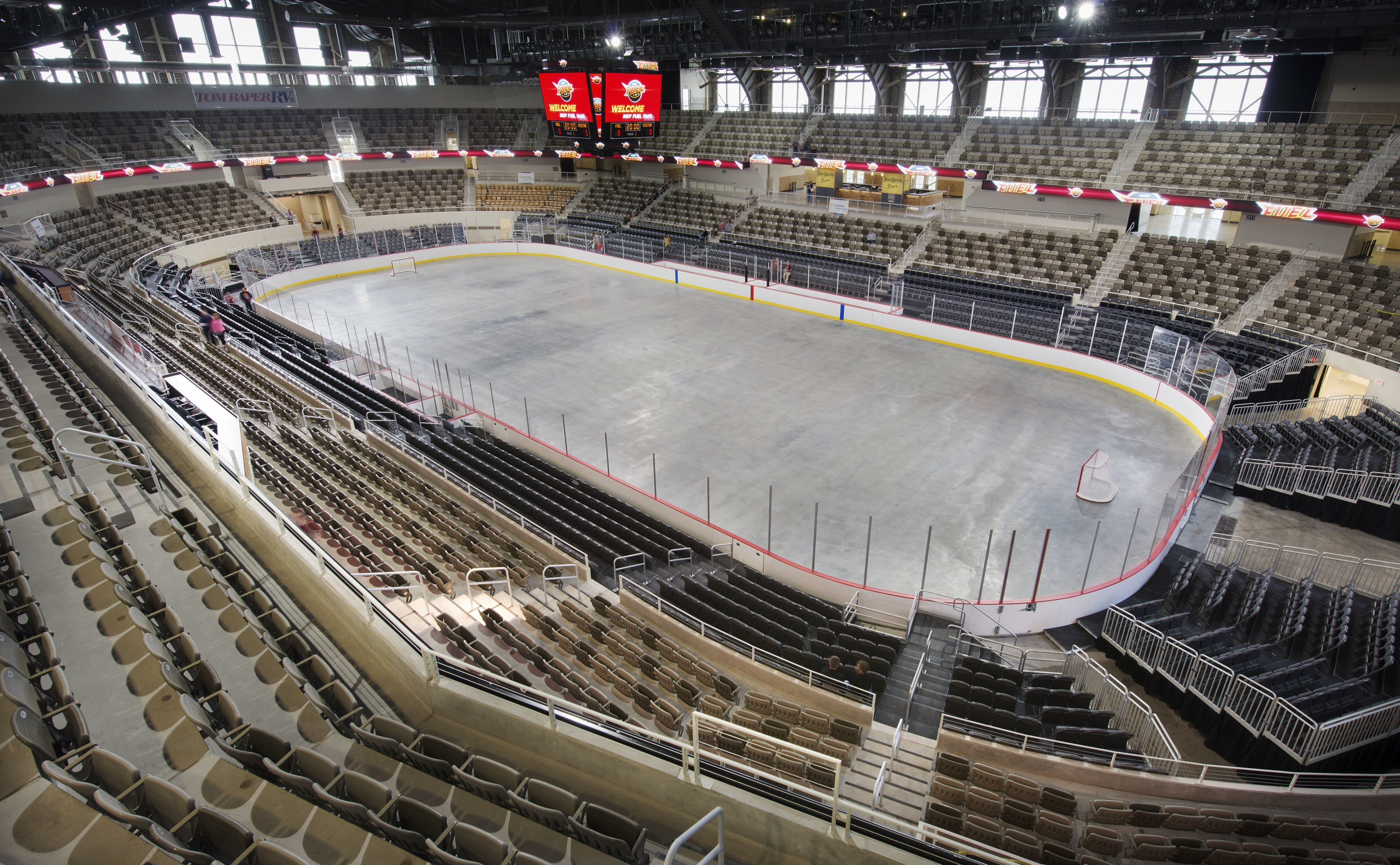
The explosion occurred inside the Indiana State Fairgrounds Coliseum (pictured 2014)

The Indiana State Fairgrounds Coliseum is a multi-use arena with a seating capacity of about 7,800 located on the Indiana State Fairgrounds in Indianapolis. On the night of October 31, 1963, 4,327 spectators were present at the arena to see the opening-night performance of Holiday on Ice. This was the first performance of the ice show's scheduled eleven-day run in Indianapolis, and the coliseum promoted it as part of its "Shriners Night". It had been raining throughout the night and, because it was Halloween, the Indianapolis Police Department (IPD) had activated more police officers than usual. The show had been scheduled to begin at 8:30 p.m. EST, but it had started about fifteen minutes behind schedule, and around 11 p.m., the finale was about to begin.

== Explosion ==
The explosion occurred at 11:06 p.m., (Note: This is the exact time given in a 1968 case study on the explosion issued by the Disaster Research Center (DRC). However, a 2003 article published in Indianapolis Monthly gives the time of the explosion as 11:04 p.m.) during the show's finale. The explosion was centered on the southeastern end of the arena, just underneath the box seats of Aisle 13. The initial blast lifted approximately 700 square feet (70 m^{2}) of floor and launched debris and spectators towards the ice rink. Shortly thereafter, a load-bearing wall underneath the stands gave way and caused an additional cave-in of about 500 square feet (50 m^{2}) of floor. A few minutes after the initial blast, (Note: Estimates vary on the time between blasts, with ranges of between three and eight minutes. A 1968 case study of the incident published by the DRC states that the shorter time estimates are probably the most accurate.) a smaller explosion occurred that produced a fireball that rose 40 feet (10 m) high. Both before and after this second blast, evacuations of the arena were underway, with the spectators mostly leaving in an orderly fashion. During the evacuation, the Holiday on Ice orchestra continued to play and reports of the evacuation make note that there was no significant mass panic, with many of the evacuees experiencing shock. The location of the explosions had left a crater measuring approximately 50 feet (15 m) across that contained a great deal of rubble and a small fire.

== Emergency response ==
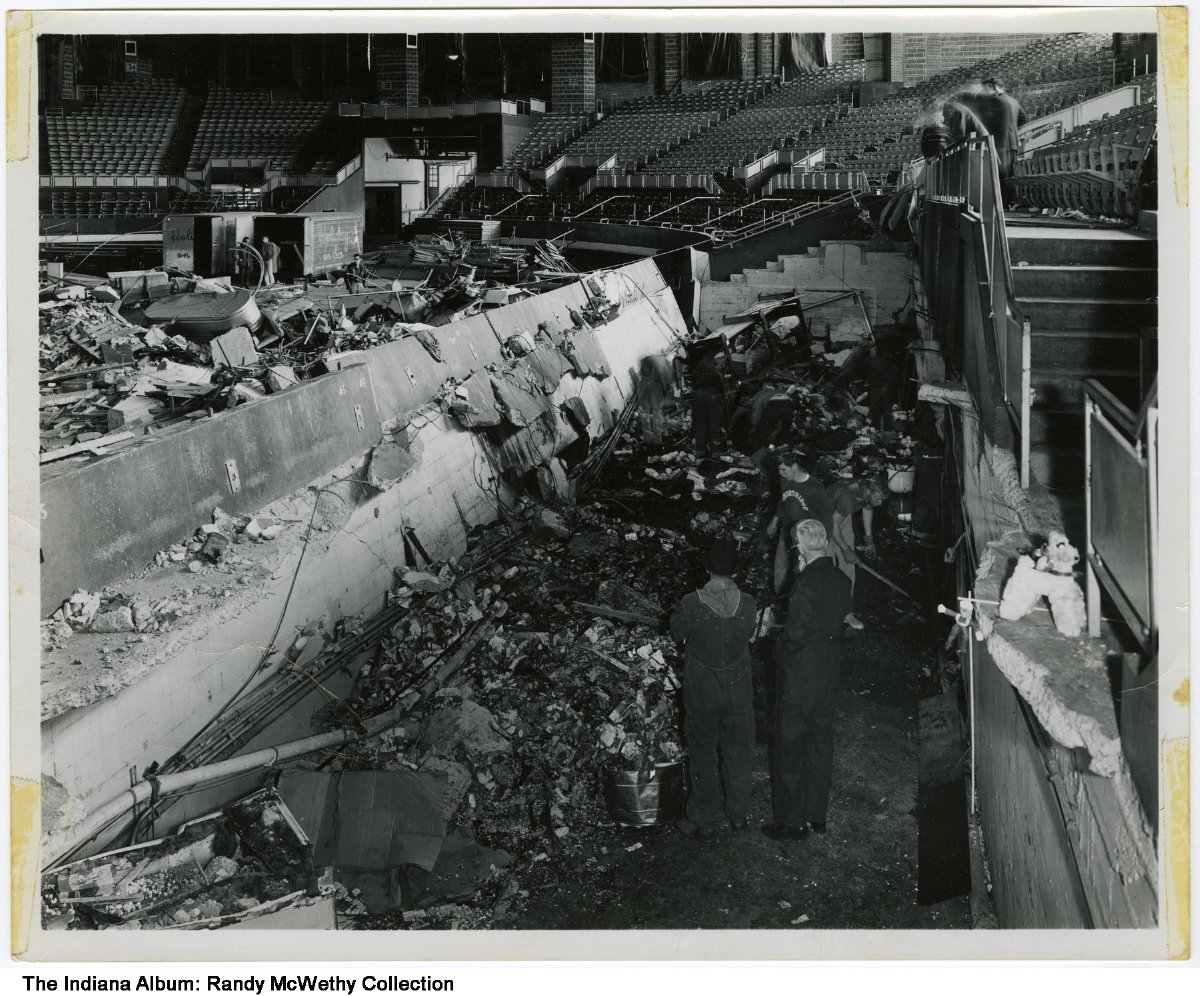
Volunteers shovel the debris in the aftermath of the explosion.

Within a minute of the first explosion, an off-duty firefighter who was in the audience telephoned the headquarters of the Indianapolis Fire Department (IFD) and informed them of the situation, immediately identifying the incident as a gas explosion. This call also alerted the IPD, as the dispatchers for the IFD and the IPD regularly monitored each other's calls. Very shortly after this call, another off-duty firefighter at the coliseum called the IFD and requested that ambulances be sent to the scene. As a result, in the first notification that any hospital received of the disaster, the dispatcher called a local hospital and requested that all three of their ambulances be sent to the arena. At 11:11 p.m., the IFD contacted the IPD directly to ensure that they were aware of the situation. A police car first arrived on the scene at 11:15 p.m., and additional cars were dispatched to the scene shortly thereafter. This initial police car radioed that an estimated 10 to 15 people had died. Around this time, additional crisis organizations in the area, such as The Salvation Army and the American Red Cross, were alerted to the situation and began to mobilize, sending some of their personnel to the coliseum to assist. Within nine minutes of the explosion, a photographer for local television station WFBM-TV was at the scene, and news of the event would be broadcast on the late-night news. The Indianapolis Star had over 40 employees work to have the story quickly added to the next morning's paper before the press deadline of 1:30 a.m.

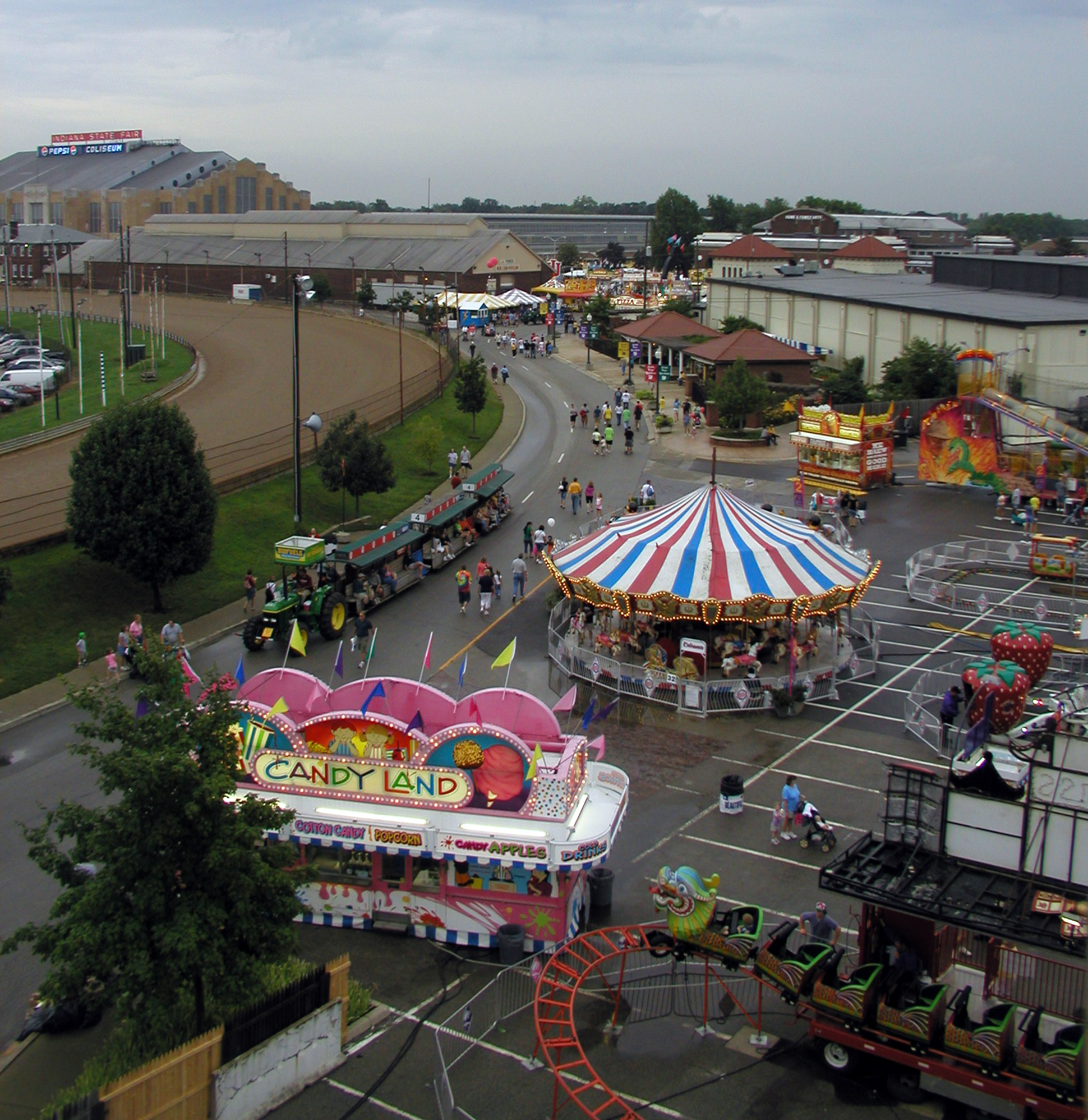
Partial view of the fairgrounds, seen here during the 2006 Indiana State Fair. The coliseum is visible in the left background.

At 11:23 p.m., a police car at the scene radioed a request for cranes and tow trucks to be sent to the arena. While the dispatcher notified them that all available tow trucks would be sent to the site, no further mention was made of sending cranes, and as much of the rubble in the arena needed to be lifted and not dragged, the trucks saw only minimal use. Around this same time, the first fire engine, which had been stationed near the entrance to the fairgrounds, arrived and began to put out the fire, with a firefighter on board giving an estimate that between 50 and 100 people had been injured. IFD dispatchers radioed the Indianapolis Fire Chief Arnold W. Phillips and called for an additional engine and rescue squad to go to the coliseum. The fire chief ordered that heavy equipment be brought in to help free some of the injured spectators from the rubble, as the firefighters' electric hacksaws had proved ineffective. Because the fairgrounds were state property, local police notified the Indiana State Police, who had been mobilized by Indiana Governor Matthew E. Welsh. The state police immediately sent three officers to the site. While initial estimates from the state police put the death toll at 12 to 15, that number continued to rise and more state police troopers were called in through the night.

The District Chief from the Office of Civil Defense's 5th District also arrived on the scene shortly after being notified by the IFD and requested both additional manpower and that all hospitals in the area be contacted and informed of the situation. In total, about 250 volunteers participated in the direct emergency response. Meanwhile, Civil Defense officials began sending their own emergency equipment, primarily focusing on tools that could remove the debris. Around 11:35 p.m., they contacted the police department of nearby Speedway, Indiana, and requested that they borrow a mobile crane from a local heavy equipment company. Speedway police responded shortly afterwards that the mobile crane was on its way via police escort, and it arrived at around 12:50 a.m. As the response efforts increased, traffic quickly became a problem as more vehicles arrived to bring emergency equipment, with ambulances being hindered in their ability to remove injured people from the site. As a result, Civil Defense officials began directing ambulances to enter the fairgrounds on the north side and exit to the west. As more injured people were removed from the coliseum, the west field of the fairgrounds became a makeshift triage center. Civil Defense officials began directing some ambulances to take their injured to a nearby military base to avoid possibly overcrowding local hospitals. U.S. Army ambulances from this facility were also deployed.

By 11:30 p.m., only 10 injured people remained in the arena. The Marion County Coroner arrived at the scene at 11:45 p.m. and was one of the first physicians present. Due to the large number of victims, the coroner established a temporary morgue on a sectioned-off part of the ice. About five minutes after the coroner arrived, the Indianapolis chief of police arrived and set about establishing a command post in a building near the fairgrounds. This post was in place by midnight and was led by five individuals: the Marion County sheriff, the police chief, the county coroner, the director of civil defense, and a representative from the state police. By midnight, almost all of the injured people who were not trapped under rubble had been taken outside of the coliseum. Shortly after midnight, the superintendent of the Indiana State Police, as well as the Salvation Army's canteen truck and nurses from the American Red Cross Motor Corps, arrived at the fairgrounds.

As cleanup efforts continued into the early morning of November 1, five liquefied petroleum gas (LP gas) tanks (Note: Also referred to in sources as propane or butane tanks.) were discovered in the wreckage and were moved to the Fire Headquarters for inspection. By 1 a.m., all wounded individuals had been removed from the site and were being treated in hospitals around the area. At 1:47 a.m., the police chief, attempting to reduce traffic congestion around the arena, barred any additional vehicles from entering the fairgrounds. About 15 minutes later, at 2 a.m., the police chief called a meeting of the command post to outline the process for body identification. At the time, only 21 bodies had been identified from the wreckage, and the police had a team of four ministers and priests to contact the deceased's next of kin. Around the same time, it was decided that the command of the situation would be gradually handed over from the chief of police to the Indiana State Police, as the fairgrounds were state property. At about 3 a.m., some relatives of those thought to be dead from the explosion began to arrive to identify their bodies, and half an hour later, a press conference was held wherein the command post gave updates about the state of the response and answered some questions regarding the cause of the incident. At 6:30 a.m., the IPD handed over control of the site to the State Police and, save for those who were assisting the coroner, most IPD officers left the site. At this point, most of the emergency tasks at the site had been completed. By 3 p.m., all but two of the deceased had been identified, and shortly thereafter, the coroner ordered that the remaining two be moved to a nearby hospital and that the coliseum be closed. By 4 p.m., the coliseum was almost entirely vacated, except for State Police officers who were stationed at the entrances.

== Aftermath ==
=== Severity of the disaster ===
The explosion was one of the worst disasters in both Indianapolis and Indiana history. Approximately 54 people died in the initial explosion, and others later succumbed to their injuries, raising the number of fatalities to approximately 81. (Note: Sources vary on the number of casualties from this disaster. Most sources that give an initial death toll give a number of 54, though other sources give the number as 65 and as high as 73. Many sources gave only the total number of fatalities, which again differed considerably. Early reports published in The New York Times gave a number of 62, which later rose to 72. Most sources state that either 70, 74, or 81 people died as a result of the explosion. The numbers given in the text are taken from a 1968 case study on the disaster published by the Disaster Research Center.) Among the dead was a former mayor of nearby Lafayette, Indiana. The 1963 coliseum explosion became the deadliest in Indianapolis's history, surpassing an 1869 boiler explosion that had killed 30 people. Coincidentally, this previous explosion had also occurred at the Indiana State Fairgrounds. According to a 1968 case study, the explosion was also "the highest single death toll ever to occur in an Indiana disaster". In addition to the fatalities, approximately 400 people were injured. (Note: While most sources give an approximate number of around 400, a 1964 newsletter published by the United States Navy gave an exact number of 385. Another source states that 374 people were taken to hospitals from the coliseum. However, on the other end, Thomas E. Drabek (a researcher for the Disaster Research Center who investigated the explosion) states that there were more than 400 injured people.) A later statement from the Marion County Sheriff's Department projected that had the performance begun on time, there would not have been as many casualties. It took until October 30, 1964, for the last person who had been injured in the explosion to be released from the hospital. A memorial service was held the following day for the victims of the explosion on the event's one-year anniversary.

=== Cause of the explosion ===
The investigation into the cause of the explosion began shortly after the injured people were removed from the coliseum and was headed by Indiana Fire Marshal Ira J. Anderson, the Indianapolis Fire Prevention Chief, and the State Police. The cause of the explosion was identified as the five LP gas tanks, each with a capacity of 100 pounds (45 kg) of propane, that had been recovered and moved to the Fire Headquarters. This was confirmed in a technical report issued by engineers from Purdue University on December 4, 1963, that said that LP gas that had leaked from the tanks was the most probable cause of the explosion. These tanks had been stored in an unventilated concessions area storeroom, which was located directly beneath the southeastern section of bleachers. The culprit tank had rusted, and it had a faulty valve from which LP gas had leaked. At some point while it was leaking, this tank had fallen over. The gas collected inside the unventilated storeroom, and it eventually roused the suspicion of a manager who opened the door to the room to discover a thick mist of gas in the air. The manager notified several employees in the area and began evacuating them, though one employee entered the room to attempt to stop the leak. Ultimately, this gas came into contact with a heating element on an electric popcorn warming machine and ignited, causing the initial blast. The second explosion that happened a few minutes later was caused by the remaining propane tanks that had not erupted in the first blast.

=== Investigation and legal issues ===
Following the explosion, a grand jury was convened by Marion County Prosecutor Noble R. Pearcy, and they took five (Note: One source states that it took the grand jury six weeks to announce their findings.) weeks to announce their findings. In total, eight state and local agencies were involved in the investigation, during which time the jurors heard testimony from 32 people involved in the incident. Overall, jurors noted a constant blame shifting from those interviewed, with many trying to clear themselves or their organizations of responsibility for the incident. Over the course of the inquiry, the sports promoter who operated the coliseum stated that, while he did not have permits to legally store the LP gas tanks inside the building, they had been in use for about ten years, during which time he was never made aware of the need for a permit. Additionally, while it was customary to have firefighters inspect venues before large public gatherings (as they had done prior to the 1961 Holiday on Ice show at the coliseum), the promoter had not reached out to the fire department prior to the 1963 show. It was revealed that, despite hosting several large gatherings throughout the year, the coliseum was inspected by firefighters only once per year, during the annual state fair. News reports showed that the fire department was aware of the LP gas tanks being used at the coliseum during this time, as they had been called to the venue several times in 1959 to investigate reports of a gas leak but had taken no precautions to stop the venue operator's practices. The state fire marshal and city fire chief argued that they had been hindered in their inspection and fire safety abilities due to a shortage of manpower, issues with legislation concerning fire safety and prevention, and a reduction in their budgets.

On December 9, 1963, the grand jury released its findings. They determined that the tanks, which lacked recommended safety caps, should not have been used indoors and should not have been stored in the arena. They also concluded that the explosion might have been prevented if an investigation by authorities had been conducted prior to the show. In total, the grand jury indicted seven people. Involuntary manslaughter charges were pressed against three individuals from the company that had supplied the LP gas tanks, the Discount Gas Corporation, and two employees of the arena's operators, the Indiana Coliseum Corporation (the general manager and the concessions manager), while misdemeanor charges were pressed against Fire Marshal Anderson and Fire Chief Phillips, the latter of whom was indicted for failure to inspect the coliseum. The grand jury placed much of the fault for the explosion on the LP gas supplier, stating that, instead of warning their customers of the dangers of an improperly installed LP gas tank, the company was "impelled by the profit from the sale ... without any regard for the safety of persons". The grand jury also criticized the Indiana Coliseum Corporation for its "steady build-up of indifference and carelessness in the unlawful handling and use" of the gas.

Despite the indictments, no one served any jail time for the disaster. Phillips's charges were overturned when it was determined that he could not be held liable for state-owned property. Additionally, despite evidence that showed that the coliseum operators had been warned about gas problems in the past, the others that had been indicted had their charges dropped because they were found not to have had a direct role in the explosion. In the end, only one person, Discount Gas Corporation's President Edward J. Franger, was found guilty by a jury, in this case of the lesser charge of assault and battery. However, this conviction was later overturned by the Indiana Supreme Court.

Survivors of the explosion and the families of those killed were awarded approximately $4.6 million in settlements. Of this, approximately $1.1 million had been paid out by the LP gas provider's insurance firm to 379 of the victims, while the company paid an additional $3.5 million in an out of court settlement. In total, more than 413 lawsuits had been filed against insurance companies and the state of Indiana for damages from the explosion, with the cumulative amounts totaling $70 million.

The explosion was analyzed in-depth by the Disaster Research Center (DRC), a group formed in 1963 at the Ohio State University to investigate and study large-scale disasters. In total, the DRC conducted three visits to the location, including one the day after the explosion had occurred. The explosion was one of the first studied by the group, and in 1968, the group published its first ever case study on the disaster.

=== Coliseum ===
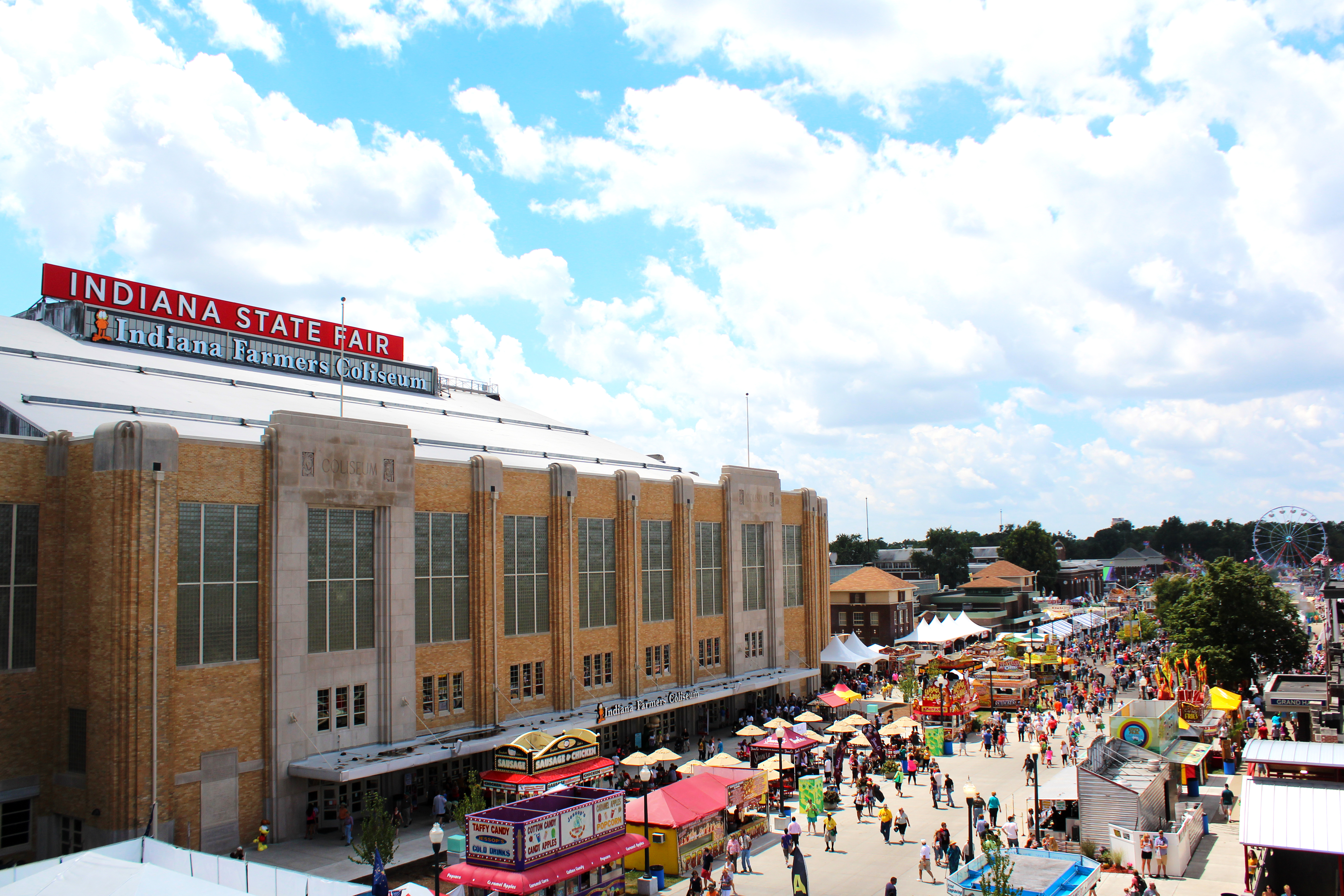
The coliseum in 2014

Following the explosion, the coliseum remained closed for 41 days while inspections were made that showed that the building was structurally sound. While there had been some concerns regarding the reopening of the coliseum, and while permanent repairs would not be completed until several months later, the Indiana State Fair Board wanted to have the venue hosting public events as soon as possible, so in early December they gave the contracted operator of the venue a vote of confidence to operate until May 1, 1964. On December 12, about six weeks after the accident, the coliseum hosted its first post-accident event, a two-day Polled Hereford cattle show. In September 1964, the coliseum served as a venue for The Beatles during their 1964 North American tour. This show was the first time since the accident that the coliseum was at full crowd capacity. On November 9, 1964, Holiday on Ice returned to the coliseum and performed before a crowd of about 5,000, exceeding the crowd that had been there the previous year.

Following the explosion, the Indianapolis Capitals of the Central Professional Hockey League, which played their home games in the coliseum, terminated their lease and relocated to Cincinnati, where they became the Cincinnati Wings. The team had begun playing earlier in October and had only played eight games in the coliseum before the incident.

In 1991, the naming rights for the arena were sold and it was renamed the Pepsi Coliseum. This sponsorship ended in 2012, and the arena became known as the Indiana Farmers Coliseum. On November 14, 2002, a memorial plaque was installed at the coliseum that bears the names of those who died in the disaster. The dedication ceremony was attended by about 100 people. Another memorial was held at the coliseum in 2013 on the fiftieth anniversary of the disaster. In 2014, the arena underwent a $63 million renovation. However, the arena looks much like it did prior to the accident.

In November 2024, the Indiana State Fairgrounds Commission and Indianapolis-based Corteva Agriscience entered into an agreement to rename the arena as Corteva Coliseum.

== See also ==
- List of gas explosions
- Indiana State Fair stage collapse
- List of disasters in the United States by death toll
- List of explosions

== Sources ==
- "Wind Causes Fatal Accident at Indiana State Fair". WILL-TV. Associated Press. August 14, 2011. Archived from the original on December 17, 2021.
- Auf der Heide, Erik (2007). "Principles of Hospital Disaster Planning". In Hogan, David E.; Burstein, Jonathan L. (eds.). Disaster Medicine (Second ed.). Philadelphia: Lippincott Williams & Wilkins. pp. 95–126. ISBN 978-0-7817-6262-5.
- Brannigan, Francis L. (1992). Building Construction for the Fire Service (Third ed.). Sudbury, Massachusetts: Jones and Bartlett Publishers. ISBN 978-0-7637-4885-2.
- Brockman, Paul (1994). "Hockey". In Bodenhamer, David J.; Barrows, Robert G. (eds.). The Encyclopedia of Indianapolis. With the assistance of David G. Vanderstel. Bloomington, Indiana: Indiana University Press. pp. 694–695. ISBN 978-0-253-11249-1.
- Campbell, Alex (October 27, 2013). "Surviving Indianapolis' greatest tragedy, 1963 Coliseum explosion". The Courier-Journal. With contributions from Cathy Knapp. Gannett.
- Cavinder, Fred D. (1985). The Indiana Book of Records, Firsts, and Fascinating Facts. Bloomington, Indiana: Indiana University Press. ISBN 978-0-253-28320-7.
- Drabek, Thomas E. (1968). Disaster in Aisle 13: A Case Study of the Coliseum Explosion at the Indiana State Fairgrounds, October 31, 1963. Disaster Research Center Series. Columbus, Ohio: College of Administrative Science, The Ohio State University. Note that the author disguised the names of the entities (hospitals, companies, etc.) involved in the incident.
- Drabek, Thomas E. (June 1996). "Disaster in Aisle 13 Revisited". In Koehler, Gus A. (ed.). What Disaster Response Management Can Learn from Chaos Theory. Sacramento, California: California Research Bureau. pp. 42–60. ISBN 978-0-7881-4499-8.
- Drabek, Thomas E. (2002). "Following Some Dreams: Recognizing opportunities, posing interesting questions, and implementing alternative methods". In Stallings, Robert A. (ed.). Methods of Disaster Research. International Research Committee on Disasters. pp. 127–153. ISBN 978-1-4691-2107-9.
- Dynes, Russell R. (1970). Quarantelli, E. L.; Dynes, Russell R. (eds.). Organized Behavior in Disaster. Disaster Research Center Series. Lexington, Massachusetts: Heath Lexington Books.
- Greenberg, Michael I. (2006a). Disaster!: A Compendium of Terrorist, Natural, and Man-Made Catastrophes. Sudbury, Massachusetts: Jones and Bartlett Publishers. ISBN 978-0-7637-3989-8.
- Greenberg, Michael I. (2006b). Encyclopedia of Terrorist, Natural, and Man-made Disasters. Sudbury, Massachusetts: Jones and Bartlett Publishers. ISBN 978-0-7637-3782-5.
- Hartz, Michael (October 25, 2018). "Halloween 1963: Dozens killed in explosion at Indianapolis Coliseum". WRTV. Archived from the original on April 18, 2021.
- Kano, Megumi; Wood, Michele M.; Siegel, Judith M.; Bourque, Linda B. (2010). "Disaster Research and Epidemiology". In Koenig, Kristi L.; Schultz, Carl H. (eds.). Koenig and Schultz's Disaster Medicine: Comprehensive Principles and Practices. Cambridge: Cambridge University Press. pp. 3–20. ISBN 978-0-521-87367-3.
- Ksander, Yaël (September 11, 2006). "1963 Coliseum Explosion". WFIU. Archived from the original on May 14, 2019.
- MacGregor, Scott (October 2003). "The Blackest Night". Indianapolis Monthly. 27 (2). Emmis Communications: 122–127, 220–222. ISSN 0899-0328. OCLC 8348365.
- Marion County Sheriff's Department (2002). Marion County Sheriff's Department: 180 Years of Tradition, 1822–2002. Paducah, Kentucky: Turner Publishing Company. ISBN 1-56311-760-6.
- McClure, Vanessa (October 31, 2013). "Survivor of deadly coliseum explosion speaks out on 50th anniversary". WXIN. Archived from the original on December 17, 2021.
- Mitchell, Dawn (October 2, 2016). "Retro Indy: The 1869 Sinker-Davis boiler calamity". The Indianapolis Star. Gannett. Archived from the original on May 9, 2021.
- Mitchell, Dawn (October 31, 2019) [January 15, 2014]. "Retro Indy: The deadly 1963 Coliseum explosion on Halloween night". The Indianapolis Star. Gannett. Archived from the original on March 17, 2021.
- Nye, Charlie (1999). Nye, Charlie; Young, Joe (eds.). Hoosier Century: 100 Years of Photographs from The Indianapolis Star and The Indianapolis News. The Indianapolis Star. Sports Publishing. ISBN 978-1-58261-237-9.
- Rader, Kevin (August 26, 2016) [November 14, 2002]. "Dedication recalls Coliseum explosion". WTHR.
- Sanders, Samantha (March 30, 2021). "The Deadly 1963 Indiana Ice Show Explosion". Grunge.com. Static Media. Archived from the original on December 17, 2021.
- "62 Dead and Hundreds Hurt in Blast at Indiana Ice Show". The New York Times. November 1, 1963. ISSN 0362-4331. Archived from the original on December 17, 2021.
- "Indiana Indicts 7 in Ice Show Blast". The New York Times. United Press International. December 10, 1963. ISSN 0362-4331. Archived from the original on December 17, 2021.
- United States House Homeland Security Subcommittee on Emergency Preparedness, Response and Recovery (2014) [August 6, 2013]. Assessing Central Indiana's Preparedness for a Mass Casualty Event. Washington, D.C.: U.S. Government Printing Office.
- "How Indianapolis Hospitals Met the Blast Emergency". United States Navy Medical News Letter. 43 (1). United States Navy Medical Department: 18. January 10, 1964.
- West, Vickie J. (1994). "Coliseum Explosion". In Bodenhamer, David J.; Barrows, Robert G. (eds.). The Encyclopedia of Indianapolis. With the assistance of David G. Vanderstel. Bloomington, Indiana: Indiana University Press. pp. 458–459. ISBN 978-0-253-11249-1.
- "74 killed in explosion at Indiana State Fair in 1963". WLS-TV. August 14, 2011. Archived from the original on September 19, 2020.
- "Road to 100: 1963". WRTV. April 5, 2016. Archived from the original on July 26, 2021.
