= Franklin Township, Marion County, Indiana =

Franklin Township Marion County
- Township
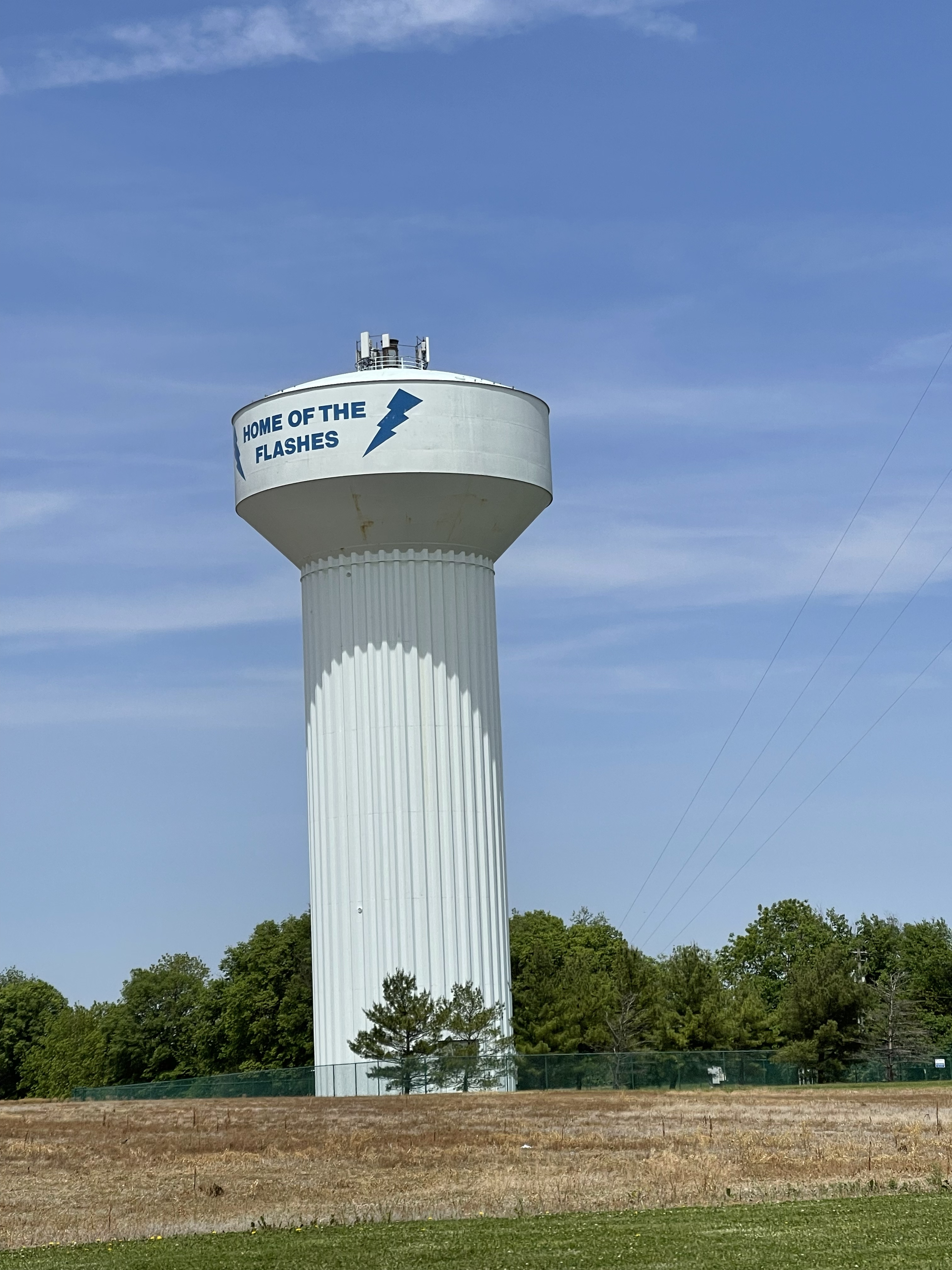
- Franklin Township's water tower in 2022.

- Seal

- Coordinates: 39°40′49″N 86°1′39″W
- Country: United States
- State: Indiana
- County: Marion
- Named after: Benjamin Franklin

Government
  - Type: Indiana township

Area
  - Total: 42.1 sq mi (109.1 km^{2})
  - Land: 42.1 sq mi (109.1 km^{2})
  - Water: 0 sq mi (0.0 km^{2})
- Elevation: 837 ft (255 m)

Population (2020)
  - Total: 65,788
  - Density: 1,562/sq mi (603.0/km^{2})
- Time zone: UTC-5 (Eastern (EST))
  - Summer (DST): UTC-4 (EDT)
- ZIP Codes: 46107, 46203, 46237, 46239, 46259
- Area code: 317
- FIPS code: 18-25504
- GNIS feature ID: 0453308
- Website: franklintownshipindiana.org

Franklin Township is one of the nine townships of Marion County, Indiana. Located in the southeast corner of the county, it is a part of the city of Indianapolis along with most of the rest of the county. It contains the communities of Acton, Wanamaker, and the eastern portion of the excluded city of Beech Grove.

Franklin Township was organized in the 1820s. Franklin Township is one of the last areas in Marion County to see heavy suburban land development from the outward expansion of Indianapolis. This is primarily because of a history of family farms in the area, but is also due to various civic efforts to maintain a rural atmosphere in the area over time.

The population of the township as of the 2020 census was 65,788 up from 32,080 in 2000. The twofold increase in population ranks Franklin Township as the fastest growing of Marion County's nine townships during that timeframe.

The township has a median income of $70,000.

Historical population
Census	Pop.	Note	%±
1890	2,256		—
1900	2,178		−3.5%
1910	2,337		7.3%
1920	2,459		5.2%
1930	2,918		18.7%
1940	3,225		10.5%
1950	4,596		42.5%
1960	7,357		60.1%
1970	10,241		39.2%
1980	16,477		60.9%
1990	21,458		30.2%
2000	32,080		49.5%
2010	54,594		70.2%
2020	66,271		21.4%
Source: US Decennial Census

== Education ==
Franklin Township Community School Corporation is the public school district that serves all of Franklin Township. The area high school is Franklin Central High School.

In recent years, Franklin Township has seen a population explosion leading to a heavy reliance on residential property taxes in particular for funding of the Franklin Township Community Schools. Also, as the Indiana Property Tax caps have been phased in from 2008 to 2011, revenue for the schools in the township has dropped more than 19.8%. After two referendums failed to close the $13 million gap in school funding, the school board proposed cuts to close the gap, including cutting teachers and halting most student busing. The shortfall is larger in Franklin Township because of the demographics being extensively residential, while the tax burden with the aforementioned property tax caps has shifted more to farms and businesses which now have a capped rate of 2% and 3% respectively.

In 2012, the Franklin Township School Corporation was able to again offer student bussing without additional fees by restructuring its debt.

== Local media ==
=== Newspapers ===
- Informer, a publication of the Franklin Township Civic League
- Pilot Flashes, newspaper of Franklin Central High School

=== Radio ===
- 91.5 WRFT "Flash FM", radio station of Franklin Central High School

== State legislators ==
The following legislators represent the districts which contain parts of Franklin Township.

=== Indiana House ===
Representative	Party	District
Mitch Gore	Democratic	89
Andrew Ireland	Republican	90

=== Indiana Senate ===
Senator	Party	District
Aaron Freeman	Republican	32

== Geography ==
=== Municipalities ===
- Beech Grove (southeast third)
- Indianapolis (partial)

=== Communities ===
- Acton
- Gallaudet
- I-65 / South Emerson (east half)
- Poplar Grove
- Wanamaker

== See also ==
- Indianapolis Cultural Districts
