= Wanamaker, Indiana =

Neighborhood in Indianapolis, Indiana, US

Wanamaker, Indiana New Bethel
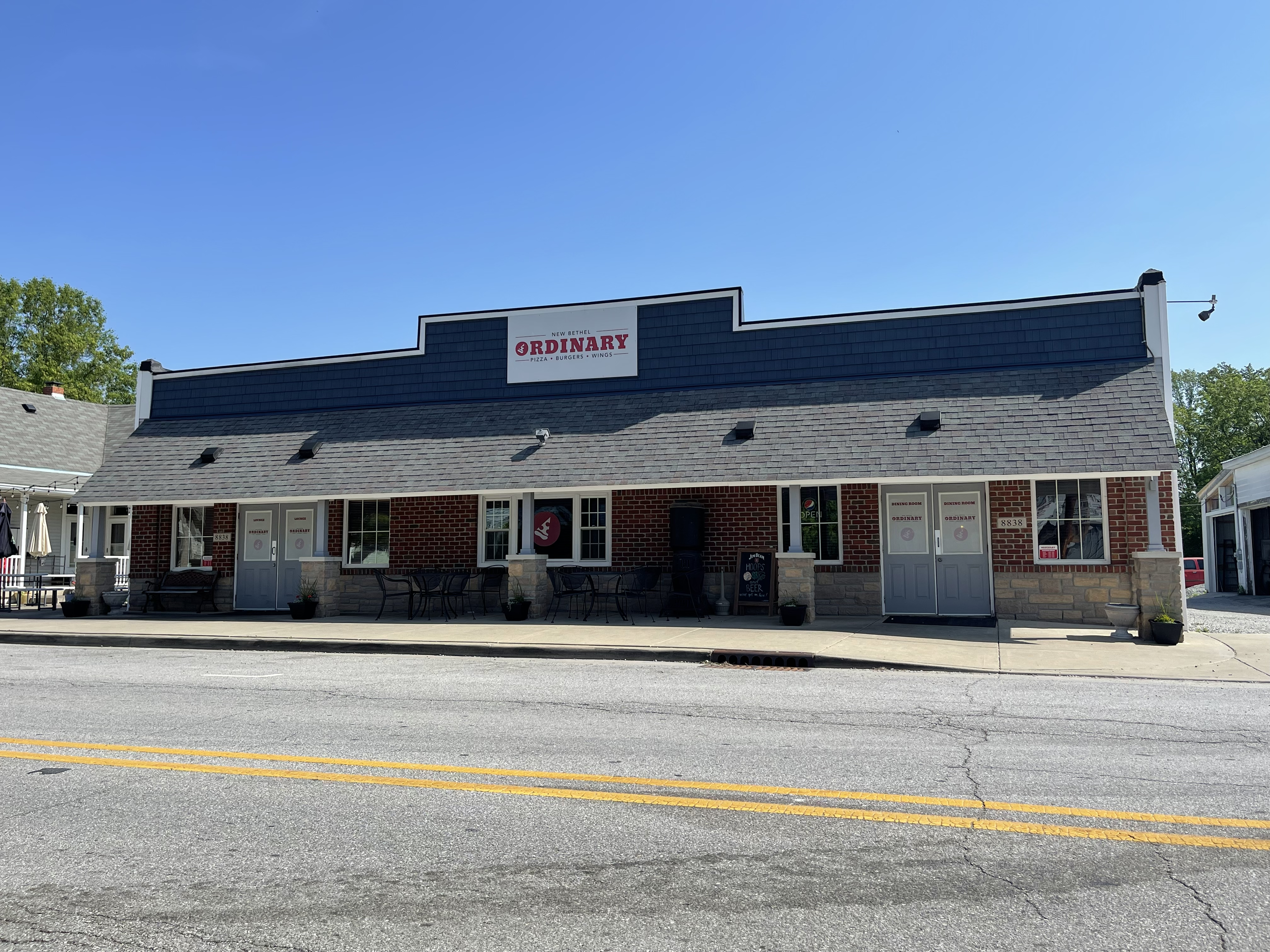
- The New Bethel Ordinary, a restaurant, in Wanamaker in 2022.

- Location of Wanamaker in the state of Indiana
- Coordinates: 39°42′15.9114″N 86°00′34.668″W
- Country: United States
- State: Indiana
- County: Marion
- City: Indianapolis
- Founded: 1834
- Named for: John Wanamaker

Government
  - Senate: Aaron Freeman (R)
  - House: Michael Speedy (R)
- Elevation: 840 ft (260 m)
- Time zone: UTC-5 (EST)
  - Summer (DST): UTC-4 (EDT)
- ZIP code: 46239
- Area code: 317
- GNIS feature ID: 440019

Wanamaker is a community of Indianapolis located in southeastern Marion County, Indiana. It is situated 9 miles (14 km) southeast of downtown Indianapolis in north central Franklin Township. The community is concentrated near the intersection of Southeastern Avenue and Northeastern Avenue. The town was built along the historic Michigan Road.

== History ==
=== The Adams Family ===
In 1825, Reuben Adams came from New Liberty, Kentucky to settle the land in the newly established State of Indiana. Adams cleared a plot of land, planted crop, and built a log cabin, after which he returned to Kentucky to bring his family to Indiana. Not long after the move to his new home Reuben became sick and died in 1826, leaving his widow, Mary Adams to raise eleven children in the Indiana wilderness. In 1834, Mary Adams had John H. Messinger lay out the town of New Bethel (the original name of Wanamaker) from a portion of her farmland. The town plat was recorded on March 24, 1834. The source of the name New Bethel came from the local New Bethel Baptist Church.

=== Post Office namesake ===
The Gallaudet post office was established on January 30, 1854. For many years mail was brought by carrier from Gallaudet to New Bethel. In 1889, a post office was established in Sutherland's Store in New Bethel. The office was named Wanamaker instead of New Bethel because there was already a post office in Indiana called Bethel. The post office was named after John Wanamaker, who was the United States Postmaster General at the time. The name Wanamaker over time became synonymous with the town of New Bethel. In 1914, after the store burned, the post office was moved across the street to a general store and interurban ticket office. In 1920, the post office once again moved to a new building at the location were the Sutherland Store had burned. On July 1, 1943, the post office advanced to Third Class office, and on July 1, 1952, it advanced to Second Class office. On May 1, 1960, it was made a branch of the Indianapolis Post Office. A new postal facility was built in 1965 with the dedication ceremony held March 13, 1965.

For many years, highway signs bore both the names New Bethel and Wanamaker. The name Wanamaker came to be accepted as the predominant local name for businesses, churches, and schools in the community. In the 1960s, the town's name was officially changed to Wanamaker after multiple proposals had been rejected by the Indiana Board of Geographic Names.

=== Gallaudet Station ===
In the 1800s, Gallaudet Station, also known simply as Gallaudet was a post office and train station on the Cincinnati, Indianapolis, St. Louis and Chicago Railway. Gallaudet Station was located 1 mile (1.6 km) south of Wanamaker. Because of the close proximity to the station, Wanamaker and the area south of it was sometimes referred to as Gallaudet or Gallaudet Station.

The Gallaudet name derives from the 350 acres of land having been originally owned by James Smedley Brown, once superintendent of the Indiana School for the Deaf. Brown named the area in honor of Thomas Hopkins Gallaudet, one of the founders of the first permanent school for the deaf in the United States. From October 1861 to November 1862, Brown served as the Gallaudet Station postmaster.

=== Michigan Road ===
The main thoroughfare in Wanamaker, Southeastern Avenue, runs over the original alignment of the historic Michigan Road. Michigan Road was one of Indiana's earliest roads and the state's first "super highway". Built in the 1830s and 1840s, the road ran from Madison to Michigan City, via Indianapolis.

=== Annexation ===
Since its founding, Wanamaker had been an unincorporated community of Marion County, located outside the city limits of Indianapolis. In 1970, by an act of the Indiana General Assembly, Indianapolis was consolidated with the government of Marion County as Unigov. Wanamaker was annexed by Indianapolis. The ZIP code for the Wanamaker area is 46239, while the preferred city for the 46239 is Indianapolis, though Wanamaker is still listed as an acceptable city.

=== Zink Raceway ===
The Zink Raceway was a local attraction just north of Wanamaker off of Post Road. The track has been closed for many years, but its remnants remain as a reminder of the days of small town racing circuits.

== Public services ==
The Indianapolis Metropolitan Police Department and Indiana State Police provide law enforcement for the community. The Indianapolis Fire Department serves the Wanamaker area. The United States Post Office Wanamaker Branch provides local postal services. Franklin Township Community School Corporation schools serve the Wanamaker area.

== Churches ==
- Franklin Central Christian Church
- Maple Hill United Methodist Church
- New Bethel Baptist Church
- Wanamaker Church of Christ
- Nativity Catholic Church

== Festivals ==
=== Old Settler's Day ===
Since the late 1980s, community service organizations have been hosting Old Settler's Day, a street fair, in downtown Wanamaker. Wanamaker's main thoroughfare, Southeastern Avenue, is closed from Northeastern Avenue to McGaughey Road for the event. Vendors set up booths the length of the avenue and sell concessions and unique products. The Classic Car Show is held in conjunction with Old Settler's Day, rain or shine. Trophies are awarded to the top three in each official car class, and special awards are presented for various achievements. The festivities are concluded by a large fireworks show at Franklin Central High School. All the money for the firework show is donated via the community.

== Highways ==
Interstate 74

== Notable people ==
- Otis Gibbs, singer-songwriter

== See also ==
- List of neighborhoods in Indianapolis
