= Indianapolis Fire Department =

Fire department of Indianapolis, Indiana, US

Coordinates: 39°47′27.6″N 86°8′52.8″W

Operational area
- Country: United States
- State: Indiana
- City: Indianapolis

Agency overview
- Established: November 14, 1859
- Annual calls: 168,131 (2017)
- Employees: 1,170 (2017)
- Annual budget: $145,068,571 (2014)
- Staffing: Career
- Fire chief: Ernest Malone
- EMS level: ALS
- IAFF: 416
- Motto: Our Family Serving Your Family

Facilities and equipment
- Battalions: 7
- Stations: 44
- Engines: 44
- Trucks: 13
- Tillers: 1
- Platforms: 8
- Squads: 4
- Rescues: 5
- Ambulances: Provided by IEMS
- Tenders: 4
- HAZMAT: 5
- USAR: 2
- Rescue boats: 5
- Light and air: 4

Website
- Official website
- IAFF website

The Indianapolis Fire Department (IFD) provides fire and rescue protection and emergency medical services to the city of Indianapolis, Indiana. In total the department serves 278 square miles (720 km^{2}).

== History ==
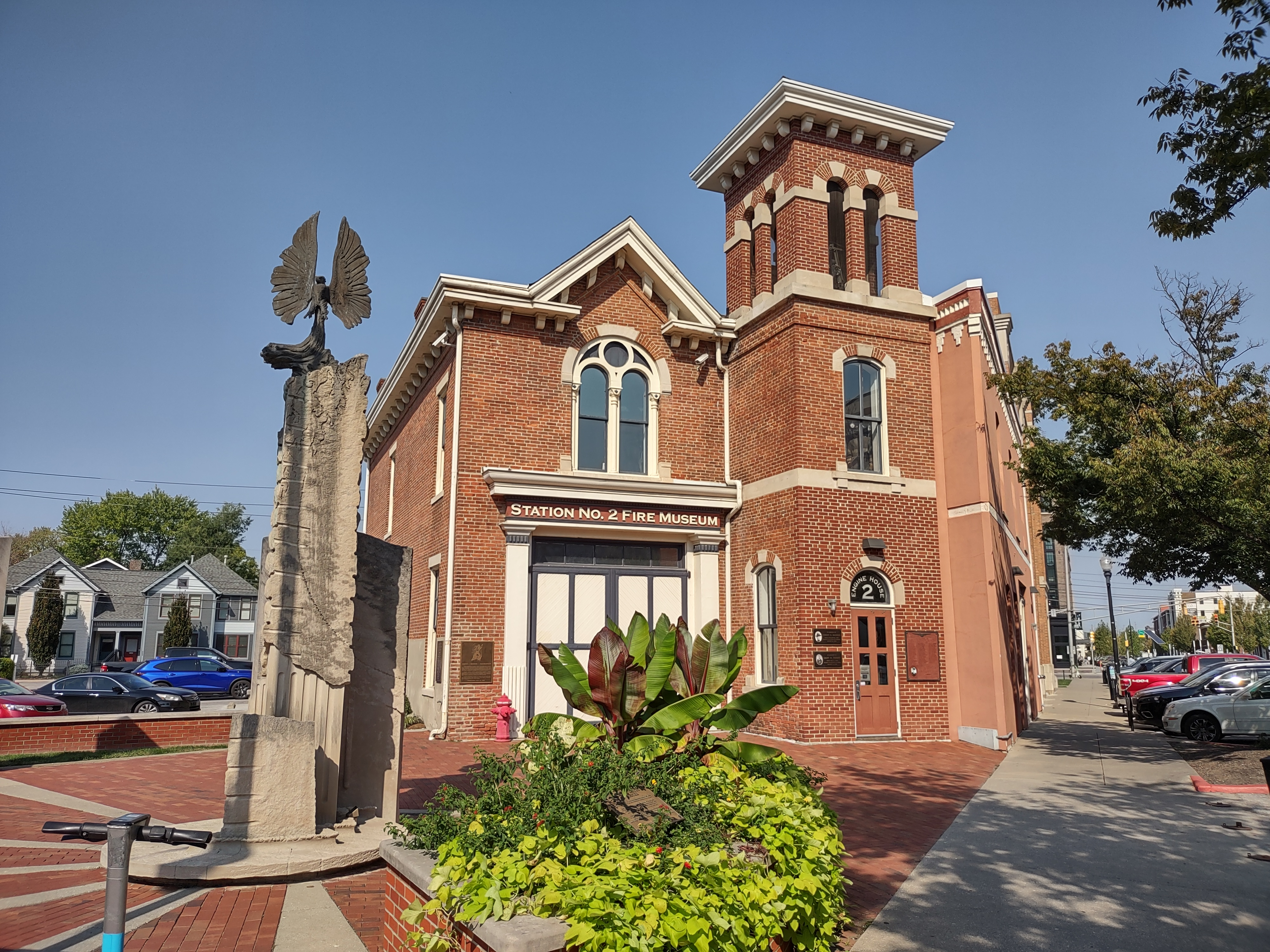
Indianapolis Fire Fighters Museum and Memorial Plaza in 2024

The first fire department in Indianapolis was not founded until June 20, 1826. It was a volunteer department that had to use a church bell for alarms, and had only ladders and leather buckets to fight fires. This was seventeen months after the first recorded fire in Indianapolis occurred on January 17, 1825, which took place in a tavern across the street from the county courthouse.

In 1835, a law was passed requiring the purchase of an engine, along with better equipment, to be partially funded by the state and partially by the city, in order to protect the Indiana Statehouse. From this, the Marion Fire, Hose, and Protection Company was established. An additional volunteer company was founded in 1841 and there were eight total volunteer companies in Indianapolis by 1859. Collectively, 600 men were volunteers in these eight companies, and although unpaid, they did receive perks such as immunity from being called on juries or militia duty, and not having to pay poll taxes or taxes for roads.

The volunteer companies were rather political, and tended to express their views freely. They were also known to break into brothels and freely use their hoses on the clientele and the interior walls, wrecking the places; this was done not for moral reasons, but rather, to amuse themselves. As a result, Mayor Samuel D. Maxwell and the Indianapolis City Council established a paid force on November 14, 1859, so that the council could have control over Indianapolis' fire protection, which it did not have over the volunteers. Maxwell was considered the father of the Indianapolis Fire Force and faced only slight criticism for the idea, although it was not widely popular at this time with the former volunteers. The Indianapolis Fire Department began with a hook and ladder company and two hand engines, but would in 1860 gain their first steam engine.

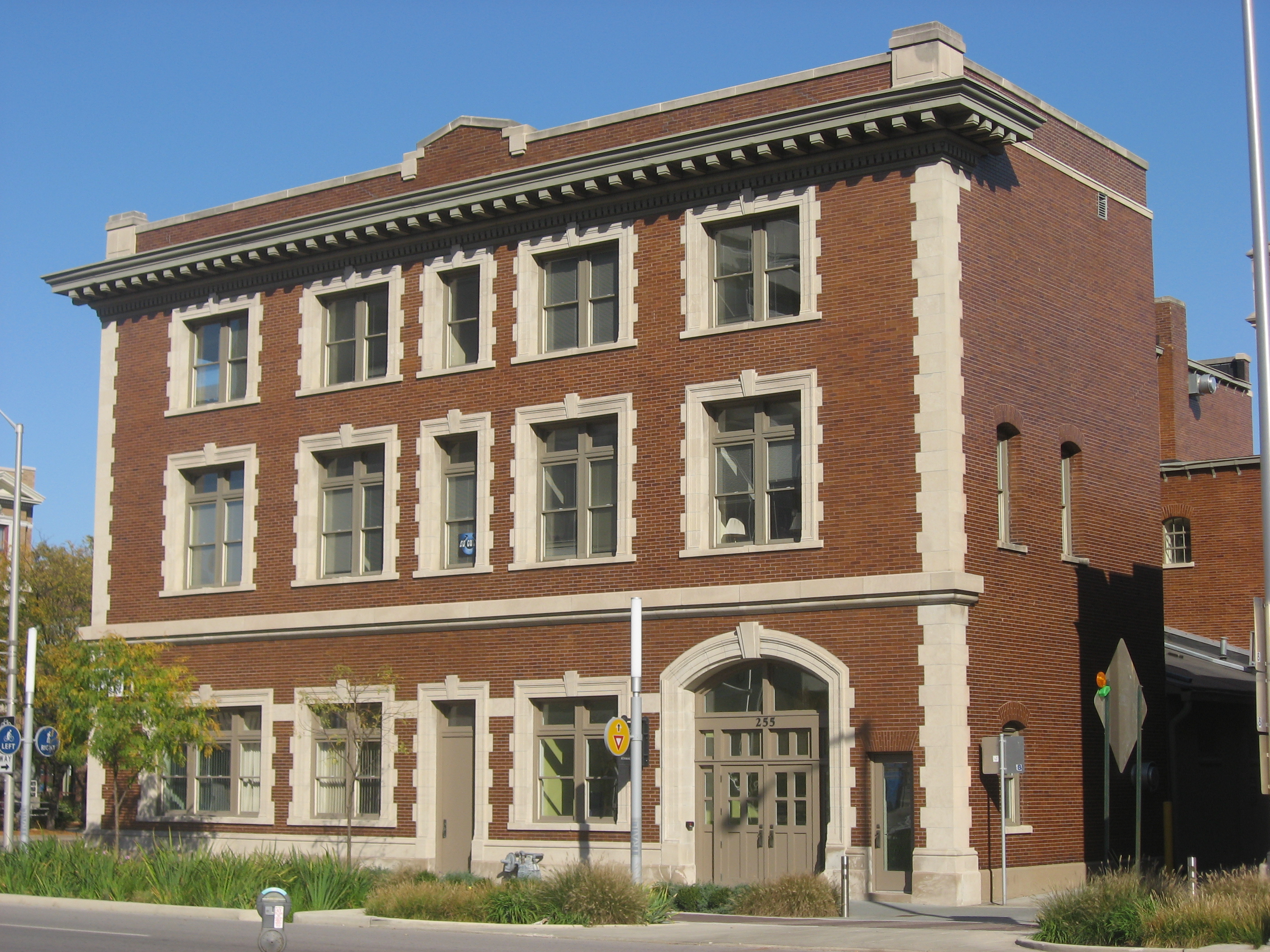
The former IFD Headquarters at 301 E. New York Street is on the National Register of Historic Places.

The paid firemen had no days off, were not allowed to leave their post except for one meal, and were seldom allowed to leave the firehouse unless on fire business or a family emergency. An ordinance in 1859 made it illegal to give firemen alcoholic beverages. Their clothes were irregular; uniforms were not worn until 1874, with a regulation uniform established in 1928. Firemen had to buy their own uniforms until 1943, when a $60 clothing allowance was established. An attempt to remove politics from the fire department was not very successful; it was necessary to mandate that the department staff be half Republican and half Democrat, and the role of fire chief was based on political affiliation and family contacts.

The first dog to discover arson for the Indianapolis Fire Department was acquired in July 1993.

== Mergers with township fire departments ==
Since 2007, several fire departments of the townships in Marion County, other than Center Township, that were not previously part of the IFD coverage area have been absorbed by IFD. As of 2026, five of the eight township fire departments have merged with IFD:

- In January 1 of 2007, Washington Township's Fire Department's station 223 merged into IFD station 6
- Warren Township, July 2007, with stations 441, 442, 443, 444, and 445, being renumbered to 41, 42, 43, 44, and 45.
- Perry Township, August 2009, with stations 61, 62, 63, and 64 changing to 23, 26, 35, and 34.
- Franklin Township, July 2010, with stations 51, 52, 53, 54 and 55 merged into IFD stations 16, 53, and 55. Station 52 had closed and the tanker that was supposed to be sent for it was instead assigned to station 16. Station 54 also closed and was converted into a health and wellness center for all IFD firefighters, which meant that the new engine 54 they were supposed to have, was gonna be sent to 16 as well. So since 2018–2026, station 16 is home to both Engine and tanker 16 which were meant for 52 and 54.
- Lawrence Township, January 2011, with station 331 renamed to 9, 332 to 17, 333 to 28, and 334 to 36. Station 36 is shared by IFD's Ladder 36 and the city of Lawrence FD Engine 36

The three townships retaining their own fire departments as of 2026 are all on the west side of Marion County.

- Decatur Township
- Pike Township
- Wayne Township

In December 2023, Wayne Township announced that it was starting a process that could lead to its fire department merging into IFD. However, in August 2024, the township announced that the merger would not occur and the township fire department would continue to operate independently.

== Mergers with excluded city fire departments ==
In July 2021, the city council of Beech Grove began consideration of an interlocal agreement under which IFD would provide fire protection services for the next 20 years. Current Beech Grove firefighters would become members of IFD.

On December 25, 2021, the Beech Grove Fire Department ceased operations and merged into IFD. Engine 57 at Station 57 was reassigned as IFD Engine 46 at Station 46. Engine 56 was reassigned as Engine 28, replacing a 2005 KME that once belonged to Lawrence Township. The city of Beech Grove retained Station 56 and all the departments ambulances. Beech Grove EMS was formed as an ALS transport service, operating Medics 56, 57, and 58.

The city of Lawrence and town of Speedway maintain their own fire departments. The city of Southport formerly used the Perry Township department and therefore is now served by IFD.

== Operations ==
There are currently fourteen Divisions of Operations within the Indianapolis Fire Department: Communications, Emergency Operations, Emergency Medical Services, Executive Services, Finance and Pension, Fire Investigations Section, Fire and Life Safety, Homeland Security/Special Operations and Training, Quartermaster, Information Technology, Media Relations, Safety, Support Services, and USAR Indiana Task Force One. There are 7 Battalions, each commanded by a Battalion Chief. All Battalion Chiefs report to the Division Chief Shift Commander (Car 10). The International Association of Firefighters (IAFF) Local is 416.

=== USAR Task Force 1 ===
The Indianapolis Fire Department is the founding member of one of the 28 FEMA Urban Search and Rescue Task Force. Indiana Task Force 1 (IN-TF1) is made up of members of multiple fire departments in Marion County.

=== Indianapolis EMS ===
911 Ambulance services in the city of Indianapolis are provided by Indianapolis Emergency Medical Services (IEMS), a division of the Health and Hospital Corporation of Marion County. In 2010, the Indianapolis Fire Department decided to discontinue the operation of the transporting ambulance assets acquired from the consolidation of Washington, Lawrence, and Franklin Township fire departments into IFD. Wishard Ambulance Service absorbed the civilian staff released from the decommissioned IFD ambulances and in December 2010, the newly enlarged Wishard Ambulance Service was rebranded as Indianapolis Emergency Medical Services. As of 2018 IEMS operates 42 ambulances, with 32 of them deployed during peak hours. Fourteen of these ambulances are co-located at IFD fire stations. While IEMS is not a part of the Indianapolis Fire Department, the two agencies work closely together in daily operations and long term EMS system planning. IEMS also provides educational and logistical support to IFD's EMS operations. Members of IEMS may choose to join the IAFF Union 416.

== Stations and apparatus ==
As of March 2026 this is the current list of stations and apparatus for the department:

Fire Station Number	Neighborhood	Engine Company	Ladder Company	Indianapolis Emergency Medical Services Units	Specialized Units	Command Units	Battalion
1	Haughville	Engine 1	Ladder 1		Tactical Unit 1 (Confined Space/Collapse)		7
2	Far Eastside	Engine 2		Medic 2			4
3	Fountain Square	Engine 3		Ambulance 3		Battalion 5	5
4	Greenbriar	Engine 4	Ladder 4 (Mid-Mount Tower)	Medic 4			1
5	Riverside	Engine 5		Ambulance 5	Tactical Unit 5 (Confined Space/Collapse)	Battalion 1	1
6	Nora	Engine 6	Ladder 6 (Tower)		Tanker 6		2
7	Downtown	Engine 7	Ladder 7 (Tiller)		Squad 7 Tactical Unit 7 (Heavy/Water/Rope Rescue); Boat 7	Car 10 (Shift Commander)	7
8	Millersville	Engine 8					3
9	Castleton	Engine 9	Ladder 9 (Heavy Rescue/Tower)		Boat 9		2
10	Brightwood	Engine 10	Ladder 10 (Tower)		Squad 10	Battalion 3	3
11	Irish Hill	Engine 11		Ambulance 11		EMS Duty Officer South	5
12	Crooked Creek	Engine 12		Medic 12			1
13	Central Station	Engine 13	Ladder 13 (Tower)		Squad 13 Tactical Unit 13 (HazMat)	Battalion 7	7
14	Kenwood Forrest	Engine 14	Ladder 14		Squad 14 Tactical Unit 14 (Heavy/Water/Rope Rescue) Boat 14		1
15	Christian Park	Engine 15	Ladder 15 (Mid-Mount Tower)				5
16	Acton	Engine 16		Medic 16	Tanker 16		6
17	Avalon Hills	Engine 17		Medic 17		Battalion 2	2
18	Hawthorne	Engine 18		Medic 18	Tactical Support Unit 18 (Air Support Unit)	Safety Central	7
19	Near Southwestside "The Valley"	Engine 19	Ladder 19 (Tower)		Tactical Unit 19 (Decon) Foam 19		7
20	Little Flower	Engine 20	Ladder 20				3
21	Clearwater	Engine 21		Medic 21 District 1		EMS Duty Officer North Safety North	2
22	Martindale	Engine 22	Ladder 22 (Tower)				3
23	Southdale	Engine 23		Medic 23 District 6	Foam 23	Battalion 6 Safety South	6
24	Devington	Engine 24		Medic 24			3
25	Irvington	Engine 25			Tactical Support Unit 25 (Air Support Unit)		3
26	Perry Meridian	Engine 26		Medic 26			6
27	"Brookside"s Bravest"	Engine 27	Ladder 27 (Mid-Mount Stick)				5
28	West Geist	Engine 28					2
29	Garfield Park	Engine 29	Ladder 29	Medic 29	Squad 29 Tactical Support Unit 29 (Air Support Unit) USAR Trailer 29		5
30	Eagledale	Engine 30	Ladder 30				1
31	Fairgrounds / “So-Bro” (South of Broad Ripple)	Engine 31	Ladder 31	Medic 31	Tactical Unit 31 (Decon Unit) Tactical Support Unit 31 (Air Support Unit)		1
32	Broad Ripple	Engine 32		Medic 32			2
33	West Eagledale	Engine 33					1
34	West Edgewood	Engine 34	Ladder 34 (Heavy Rescue/Tower)		Tanker 34		6
35	Southport	Engine 35	Ladder 35 (Mid-Mount Tower)	Medic 97 [or Medic 35]			6
36	Geist East	Engine 36 (City of Lawrence)	Ladder 36 (Tower)	Medic 36 (City of Lawrence)			2
41	Washington Square	Engine 41		Medic 41			4
42	Raymond Park	Engine 42		Medic 42	Tanker 42		4
43	Eastgate	Engine 43	Ladder 43 (Heavy Rescue/Tower)			Battalion 4	4
44	Eastside	Engine 44	Ladder 44	Medic 44	Tactical Unit 44 (HazMat Unit)		4
45	Far Eastside	Engine 45		Medic 98 [or Medic 45]			4
46	Beech Grove	Engine 46					5
53	Bunker Hill	Engine 53		Medic 53	Grass Rig 53		6
55	Wanamaker	Engine 55	Ladder 55		Tanker 55		4

== Notable incidents ==
=== Ramada Inn air crash and fire ===
The Ramada Inn Air crash and fire was an aircraft accident that occurred at the Airport Ramada Inn in Indianapolis, Indiana, when a United States Air Force (USAF) pilot failed to reach the runway and the plane crashed into the nearby Ramada Inn. On the morning of October 20, 1987, a USAF A-7D-4-CV Corsair II, serial 69-6207, sustained some sort of engine failure about 15 miles (24 km) southwest of the city at around 31,000 feet. The pilot survived after ejecting but nine people were killed in the hotel when the aircraft smashed into the side of the building.
