= Rusununguko =

Rusununguko may refer to:

- Sunungura Rusununguko (born 1978), American football player
- Rusununguko Secondary School, school in Shurugwi District, Zimbabwe
