= Kirchhofer =

Kirchhofer or Kirchhöfer is a surname. Notable people with the surname include:

- Cindy Kirchhofer (born 1961), American politician
- Marvin Kirchhöfer (born 1994), German racing driver
