= Donald Washington (gridiron football) =

American gridiron football player (born 1986)

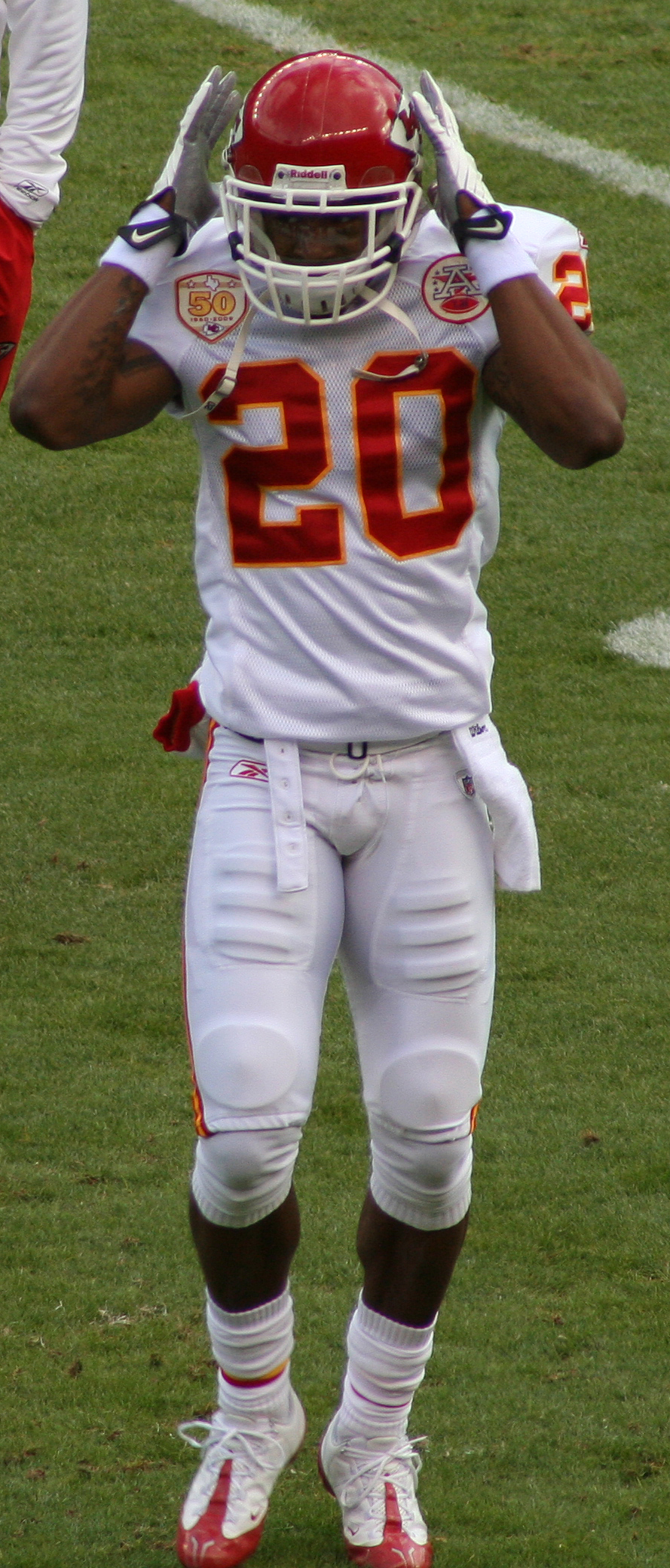
- Washington III at a game in Denver in 2010

No. 20, 31, 30, 27
- Position: Cornerback

Personal information
- Born: July 28, 1986 (age 40); Indianapolis, Indiana, U.S.
- Listed height: 6 ft 0 in (1.83 m)
- Listed weight: 197 lb (89 kg)

Career information
- High school: Franklin Central (Indianapolis)
- College: Ohio State
- NFL draft: 2009: 4th round, 102nd overall pick

Career history
- Kansas City Chiefs (2009–2011); Toronto Argonauts (2014); Hamilton Tiger-Cats (2015); Pittsburgh Steelers (2016)*
- * Offseason or practice squad member only

Career NFL statistics
- Total tackles: 52
- Forced fumbles: 1
- Pass deflections: 2
- Stats at Pro Football Reference

Donald David Washington III (born July 28, 1986) is an American former professional football player who was a cornerback in the National Football League (NFL). He played college football for the Ohio State Buckeyes and was selected in the fourth round of the 2009 NFL draft by the Kansas City Chiefs. He played high school football at Franklin Central High School in Indianapolis.

Washington also played for the Toronto Argonauts and Hamilton Tiger-Cats of the Canadian Football League (CFL).

== College career ==
Washington enrolled at Ohio State in 2005, but spent the season performing on the scout team. He was named the team's Outstanding Freshman in 2006, starting nine games at boundary cornerback and nickel back in 2006. He produced 41 tackles (28 solos) with a stop behind the line of scrimmage. He also caused two fumbles and recovered another that he returned 48 yards.

As a sophomore, Washington moved to field cornerback, starting all 13 games. He registered 39 tackles (29 solos) that included his only sack as a Buckeye. He recovered a fumble, broke up two passes and returned an interception 70 yards for a touchdown. Washington was suspended for the team's first two games of the 2008 season for a violation of team rules. "I'll be honest and admit I made a mistake," he said. "That's the only way you can handle it. The best thing to do is just be honest."

When he returned, he spent most of the season as a reserve, starting two games at boundary cornerback. He managed just 22 tackles (18 solos) with a fumble recovery and a 34-yard interception return. Washington joined receiver Brian Hartline and running back Beanie Wells as three Ohio State underclassmen to declare for the 2009 NFL draft.

== Professional career ==
Pre-draft measurables
Height	Weight	Arm length	Hand span	40-yard dash	10-yard split	20-yard split	20-yard shuttle	Three-cone drill	Vertical jump	Broad jump	Bench press
6 ft 0 1/4 in (1.84 m)	197 lb (89 kg)	31 1/2 in (0.80 m)	9 1/8 in (0.23 m)	4.52 s	1.51 s	2.56 s	4.13 s	6.70 s	45.0 in (1.14 m)	11 ft 3 in (3.43 m)	9 reps
All values from NFL Combine/Pro Day

=== Kansas City Chiefs ===
Washington was selected in the fourth round of the 2009 NFL draft by the Kansas City Chiefs with the 102nd overall pick. Washington was on the Chiefs as a second string strong safety. In 2011, Washington finished his season with 25 tackles, 1 forced fumble, and one pass deflection. On August 31 Washington was cut by the Kansas City Chiefs after being pulled over by state police and found to be carrying marijuana and suspected MDMA. He was later charged with possession of a controlled substance and convicted of a Felony in the fourth degree.

=== Toronto Argonauts ===
On May 7, 2014, Washington was signed by the Toronto Argonauts of the Canadian Football League. During the 2014 CFL season, Washington recorded 14 defensive tackles and 1 special teams tackle.

On June 14, 2015, Washington was released by the Argonauts.

=== Pittsburgh Steelers ===
On May 7, 2016, Washington was signed by the Pittsburgh Steelers after receiving a tryout at their rookie minicamp. On September 3, 2016, he was released by the Steelers as part of final roster cuts.
