= Otis Gibbs =

American singer-songwriter

- Gibbs in 2021

Background information
- Born: Paul Otis Gibbs III; February 11, 1966 (age 60); Wanamaker, Indiana
- Genre: Folk music
- Occupation: Singer-songwriter
- Instrument: Guitar
- Years active: 2002–present
- Labels: Wanamaker; Benchmark; Flat Earth
- Members: Thomm Jutz; Mark Fain; Paul Griffith; Amy Lashley
- Website: otisgibbs.com

Paul Otis Gibbs III is an American alt-country singer-songwriter and podcaster who has independently released several albums since 2002.

== Biography ==
Gibbs was raised in Wanamaker, Indiana, a neighborhood on the outskirts of Indianapolis. He recalls being introduced to the music industry at an early age, when a friend of his aunt's that was supposed to be babysitting him would take him to a nearby saloon to earn money by singing while he played the piano.

Gibbs worked for over 10 years as a tree planter in Indiana, planting what he estimates to be over 7,000 trees.

== Music career ==
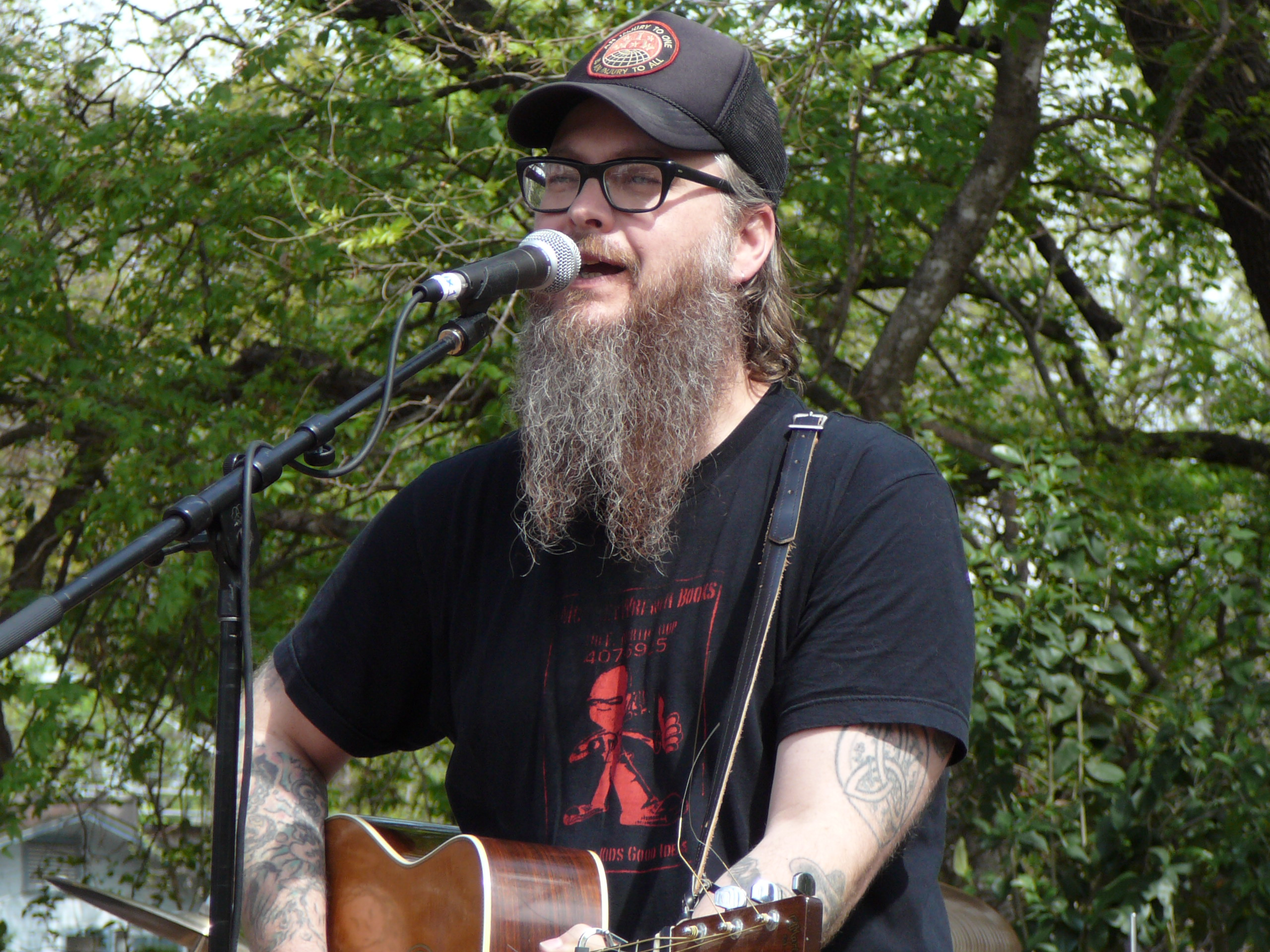
SXSW 2009: Jovita's, Austin, TX March 21, 2009 (Twangfest party)

Gibbs' songs feature stories about everyday life. He has been compared to Woody Guthrie, Tom T. Hall, Kris Kristofferson, and Townes Van Zandt.

His 2014 album, Souvenirs of a Misspent Youth was described as "his most pleasing, direct and artful work" by The Tennessean. Alan Harrison of No Depression notes that "The Darker Side of Me" is the type of song that Johnny Cash would be interested in recording.

Billy Bragg included Gibbs' song "The Peoples Day" in a list of "Top Five Songs with Something to Say", published in the Wall Street Journal. Andy Gill of The Independent wrote that there is a "authenticity and dedication in Gibbs' delivery which is somehow cleansing in its purity".

== Other activities ==
Gibbs has recorded more than 100 podcasts under the title "Thanks for Giving a Damn" that consist of conversational interviews with musicians. Podcasts have included conversations with Mando Saenz, Ramsay Midwood, Chris Shiflett (Foo Fighters), Marshall Crenshaw, Jim White, Delbert McClinton, and Amy Lashley. The podcast has been featured on iTunes' "New And Noteworthy" and "What's Hot" lists.

== Personal life ==
Gibbs lives in Indianapolis, Indiana, with his long-time partner Amy Lashley, a singer-songwriter and children's book author.

== Discography ==
Year	Title	Label
2002	49th and Melancholy	Flat Earth Records
2003	Once I Dreamed of Christmas	Benchmark
2004	One Day Our Whispers	Benchmark
2008	Grandpa Walked a Picketline	Wanamaker
2010	Joe Hill's Ashes	Wanamaker
2012	Harder Than Hammered Hell	Wanamaker
2014	Souvenirs of a Misspent Youth	Wanamaker
2016	Mount Renraw	Wanamaker
2020	Hoosier National	Wanamaker
2025	The Trust of Crows	Wanamaker
