= Mitch Gore =

American politician

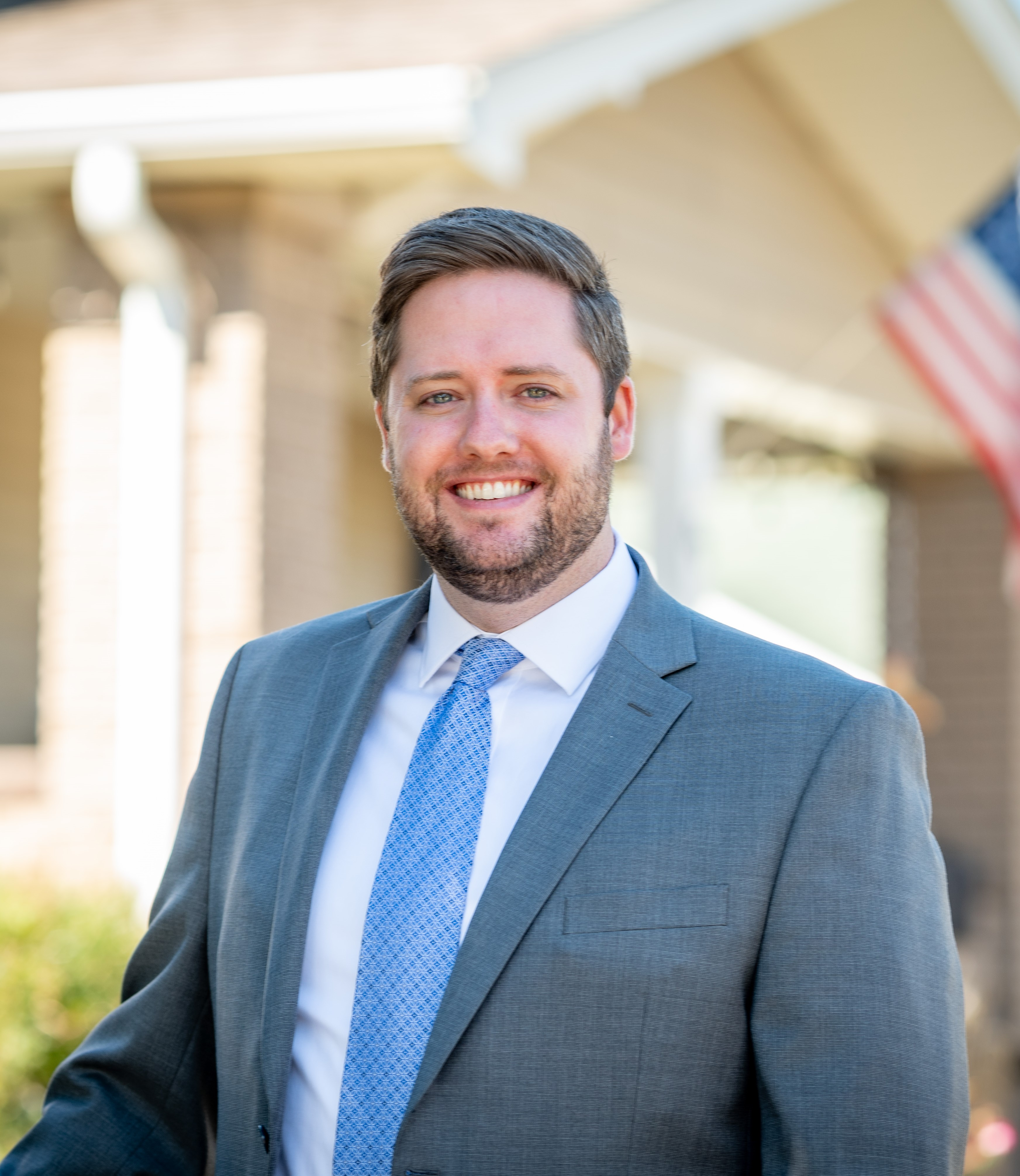
- Gore in 2020

Assistant Minority Whip of the Indiana House Democratic Caucus
- Incumbent
- Assumed office November 8, 2022

Member of the Indiana House of Representatives from the 89th district
- Incumbent
- Assumed office November 16, 2020
- Preceded by: Cindy Kirchhofer

Personal details
- Born: January 20, 1992 (age 34) Indianapolis, Indiana, U.S.
- Party: Democratic
- Spouse: Brittany
- Education: Franklin Central High School; University of Indianapolis (Bachelor's Degree)

Mitch Gore (born January 20, 1992) is an American politician and corrections officer currently serving as a Democratic member of the Indiana House of Representatives from the 89th district. He assumed office on November 4, 2020.

== Early life and education ==
Gore was born in Indianapolis. He attended Franklin Central High School and the University of Indianapolis, earning a Bachelor's degree from the latter.

== Career ==
Gore serves as a captain with the Marion County, Indiana Sheriff's Office, where he oversees community development projects. He was elected to the Indiana House of Representatives in November 2020. Gore defeated Republican incumbent Cindy Kirchhofer. Gore was challenged by Republican Indianapolis City-County Councillor Michael-Paul Hart. Gore defeated Hart in the 2022 General Election. Gore was challenged by Republican Yvonne Metcalfe. Gore defeated Metcalfe in the 2024 General Election.

Gore has authored three laws. In 2023, HEA 1365 was signed into law by Governor Eric Holcomb to ban the use of glock switches. In 2024, HEA 1021 was signed into law to create a public alert system for missing at-risk veterans; and HEA 1422 was signed into law to better define and increase penalties for chemical intoxicants in prison.

In 2025, Gore suggested that HB 1041, which bans transgender females from participating in women's sports, would cause transgender student athletes to take their own lives, and authored an amendment to require the state to pay for their funerals in such cases.

== Electoral history ==
Indiana State House District 89 election, 2020
Party	Candidate	Votes	%	±%
Democratic	Mitch Gore	13,898	51.3%	+1.8%
Republican	Cindy Kirchhofer (incumbent)	13,173	48.7%	−1.8%
Total votes		27,071	100.00%	

Indiana State House District 89 election, 2022
Party	Candidate	Votes	%	±%
Democratic	Mitch Gore (incumbent)	6,960	51.0%	−0.3%
Republican	Michael-Paul Hart	6,695	49.0%	+0.3%
Total votes		13,655	100.00%	

Indiana State House District 89 election, 2024
Party	Candidate	Votes	%	±%
Democratic	Mitch Gore (incumbent)	12,940	55.8%	+4.8%
Republican	Yvonne Metcalfe	10,230	44.2%	−4.8%
Total votes		23,170	100.00	
