= Roger Burkman =

American basketball player and athletic director

Personal information
- Born: May 22, 1958 (age 68) Indianapolis, Indiana
- Listed height: 6 ft 5 in (1.96 m)
- Listed weight: 175 lb (79 kg)

Career information
- High school: Franklin Central (Indianapolis, Indiana)
- College: Louisville (1977–1981)
- NBA draft: 1981: 6th round, 130th overall pick
- Drafted by: Chicago Bulls
- Playing career: 1981–1982
- Position: Guard
- Number: 34

Career history
- 1981: Chicago Bulls
- 1981–1982: Anchorage Northern Knights

Career highlights
- NCAA champion (1980); Indiana Basketball Hall of Fame Inductee
- Stats at NBA.com
- Stats at Basketball Reference

Roger Allen Burkman (born May 22, 1958) is a retired American basketball player and athletic director at Spalding University in Louisville, Kentucky. Born in Indianapolis, Indiana, he played high school basketball at Franklin Central High School. He played collegiately for the University of Louisville, and was a member of the school's 1980 national championship team. Burkman was selected by the Chicago Bulls in the 6th round (130th pick overall) of the 1981 NBA draft. He played for the Bulls (1981–82) in the NBA for 6 games. Burkman played for the Anchorage Northern Knights of the Continental Basketball Association during the 1981–81 season.

He was inducted in the Indiana Basketball Hall of Fame.

He is married to Jefferson County Circuit Judge Judith McDonald-Burkman.

== Career statistics ==
=== NBA ===
Legend
GP	Games played	GS	Games started	MPG	Minutes per game
FG%	Field goal percentage	3P%	3-point field goal percentage	FT%	Free throw percentage
RPG	Rebounds per game	APG	Assists per game	SPG	Steals per game
BPG	Blocks per game	PPG	Points per game	**Bold**	Career high

==== Regular season ====
Year	Team	GP	GS	MPG	FG%	3P%	FT%	RPG	APG	SPG	BPG	PPG
1981–82	Chicago	6	0	5.0	.000	.000	.833	1.0	.8	1.0	.4	.8
