= Walter Lobyn Hamilton =

American artist

- Born: 1985 (age 40–41); Indianapolis, IN
- Education: Franklin Central High School
- Occupation: Artist
- Known for: Vinyl-based artwork
- Website: lobynhamilton.com

Walter Lobyn Hamilton is an African-American artist native to Indianapolis, Indiana. His artwork utilizes smashed or cut vinyl record pieces as the medium for portraits and flags. Hamilton's work has been featured in the Indiana State Museum, the Indianapolis Museum of Art, and Long-Sharp Gallery.

== Early life and education ==
Hamilton was raised in Indianapolis in the 1990s with his three brothers and sister. When Hamilton was in the ninth grade at Franklin Central High School, his father, Clayton Hamilton, gifted his son a deejay kit.

== Career ==
Hamilton's career began as a freelance disc jockey often hired on to play turntables at college parties. After a leg injury and chronic pain prevented him from continuing his career as a DJ, Hamilton's frustration led him to going into his basement and smashing his vinyl records in an act of anger. His artwork developed from the broken pieces after seeing the shards in a new light several months later inspired him to utilize them as his artistic medium. From the pieces Hamilton created a portrait of Jimi Hendrix on wood board with a painted red background.

In 2011, Hamilton's vinyl record portraits were featured in the Indy Arts Council's Art and Soul Festival.

The Indiana State Museum featured Hamilton's portrait piece, "Dark Fantasy", in their 2012 exhibit "REPRESENT: Art by African-Americans". The portrait displays Hamilton's usual medium of broken vinyl shards in order to create a silhouette representation of a woman with a large afro. Hamilton's inspiration for "Dark Fantasy" came from seeing his sister return home one day sporting a large afro with a red flower in her hair.

In Studio Museum Harlem, a vinyl piece of Angela Davis was put on display in 2018 after its creation in 2015. Also in 2018, Hamilton had an exhibit shown in Long-Sharp Gallery, displaying multiple of his pieces. This exhibit was called "Narrative Not Included" and was also showcased in Johnson & Johnson, Nas, Kanye West and the Fox TV Show "Empire".

In 2021, Hamilton's "One Nation Under A Groove" project was displayed in Brose Partington Studio, a large project utilizing vinyls of music throughout Hamilton's entire life. This art piece was also shown at Newfields later, albeit a smaller version titled "One Nation Under A Groove Box Set, Vol. 2" in the "What I Have You Have" exhibition in 2023.

The "What I Have You Have" exhibition in Newfields is a series of six art pieces made of broken vinyl, shaped like flags. It is present within Newfields as well as at partner locations; the Indianapolis Symphony Orchestra, University of Indianapolis, and Indianapolis Central Library.
