= Acton, Indiana =

Neighborhood in Indianapolis, Indiana, US

- Location within Indiana
- Coordinates: 39°39′20″N 85°58′00″W
- Country: United States
- State: Indiana
- City: Indianapolis
- County: Marion
- Township: Franklin
- Founded: 1852
- Named for: General Acton
- Elevation: 791 ft (241 m)
- Time zone: UTC-5 (EST)
- ZIP code: 46259
- Area code: 317

Acton is a small community located in the southeast corner of Marion County, Indiana, and has been a part of the city of Indianapolis under the Unigov legislation passed by the Indiana General Assembly in 1969. The community was named for an early settler, General Acton.

== History ==
The community's original name was Farmersville. The town was renamed in 1854 when the U.S. Postal Service discovered there was already a town named Farmersville in Posey County, Indiana.

From 1859 to 1905, a group of Methodists operated the Acton Camp Ground on 40 acres (16 ha) just north of the town, at the corner of Southport and Acton roads. An agreement with the Indianapolis and Cincinnati Railroad provided good access to the camp grounds. Fire destroyed the camp buildings in 1864, but the association rebuilt them. Another fire in 1905 again destroyed the camp, but this time efforts to raise funds to rebuild fell short, and the land was sold. In 2004, a portion of the land that had held the campground was acquired by the city of Indianapolis and became Acton Park.

== Notable people ==
- Marjorie Main, Oscar-nominated American actress

== See also ==
- List of neighborhoods in Indianapolis
