= Indianapolis Fire Headquarters and Municipal Garage =

- U.S. National Register of Historic Places
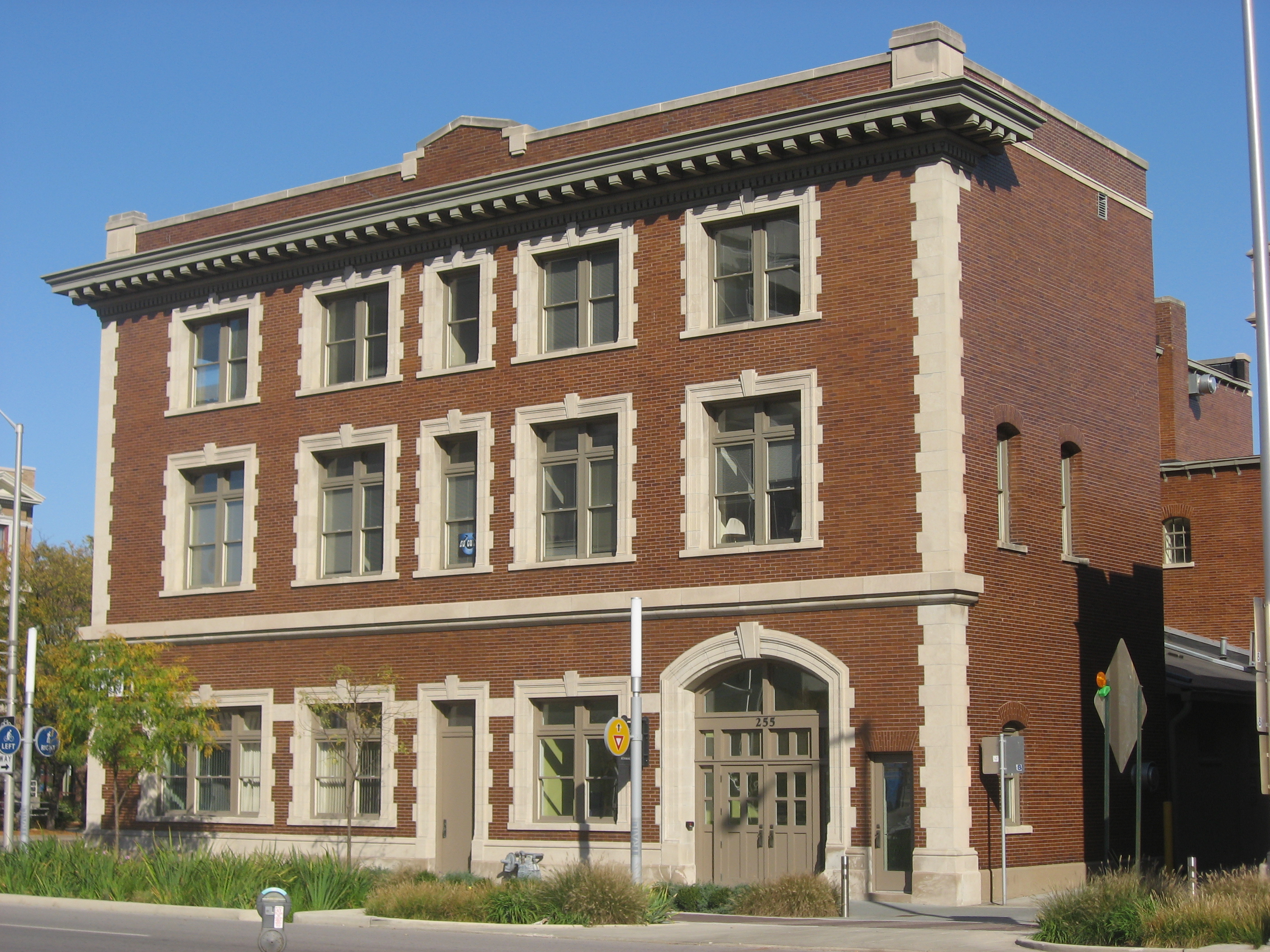
- Indianapolis Fire Headquarters, October 2010

- Location within Indianapolis Location within Indianapolis Location within Indiana Location within the United States
- Location: 301 E. New York St., and 235 N. Alabama St., Indianapolis, Indiana
- Coordinates: 39°46′14″N 86°9′8″W
- Area: less than one acre
- Built: 1913, 1925
- Architect: Bohlen & Son; Hunter, Frank B.
- Architectural style: Classical Revival, Tudor Revival
- NRHP reference No.: 02000686
- Added to NRHP: June 27, 2002

Indianapolis Fire Headquarters and Municipal Garage is a historic fire station and garage located at Indianapolis, Indiana. The Fire Headquarters was built in 1913 for the Indianapolis Fire Department, and is a three-story, Classical Revival style orange-brown glazed brick building with limestone detailing. It sits on a concrete foundation and has a square brick parapet. The Classical Revival style Municipal Garage was built in 1913, and expanded in 1925 with two Tudor Revival style additions.

It was listed on the National Register of Historic Places in 2002.

== See also ==
- National Register of Historic Places listings in Center Township, Marion County, Indiana
