= Franklin Central High School =

Public high school in Indianapolis, Indiana, US

Location
- 6215 South Franklin Road; Indianapolis, Indiana 46259; United States; 39°40′37″N 86°00′55″W

Information
- Type: Public high school
- Motto: Let's Go Flashes!
- Established: 1960
- School district: Franklin Township Community School Corporation
- CEEB code: 153665
- Principal: Zakary Tschiniak
- Teaching staff: 179.08 (FTE)
- Grades: 9–12
- Enrollment: 3,381 (2023-2024)
  - Other: Franklin Central Early College
- Student to teacher ratio: 18.88
- Colors: Royal blue and white
- Athletics conference: Hoosier Crossroads Conference
- Team name: Flashes
- Rivals: Roncalli High School
- Website: fc.ftcsc.org

Franklin Central High School (FCHS or FC) is a public, four-year high school in Indianapolis, Indiana, United States. It is the only high school in the Franklin Township Community School Corporation.

== History ==
Franklin Township was established in 1836. By the late 1800s, the township contained 11 different schoolhouses serving 400 students. In the early 1910s, the New Bethel School was built at 4100 S Post Road, and a newer Acton school to replace the one built 35 years prior, was built on Acton Road. In 1938, the New Bethel and Acton Schools were consolidated to a larger Franklin Township High School located at Post Road.

From the 1940s to the 1950s, there was a large boom in the population of Franklin Township, reaching a population percentage increase of 42.5 percent from 3,225 people in the 1940 census, to 4,596 people in the 1950 census.

This population boom would push the school system to expand in order to accommodate for this large influx of students. By September 1960, a newer Franklin Township High School building would be built on 6019 S Franklin Road (stood as the Franklin Township Middle School from 1975 to 2002, and as the Franklin Township Learning Annex from 2019 onward).

From 1960 to 1970, the population in Franklin Township would increase 39.2% from 7,357 people in the 1960 census, to 10,241 people in the 1970 census.

=== Super Bowl performance ===
During the 2012 Super Bowl XLVI halftime show in Indianapolis, the Franklin Central drum line and three other local high schools performed alongside Madonna.

=== Flashes Wall of Fame ===
Since 2018, Franklin Central High School has added many educators to the "Flashes Wall of Fame" for their achievements and contributions to the school. The wall was removed during the 2025–2026 school year due to building renovations.

== Sport and extracurricular activities ==
=== Athletics ===
Franklin Central is a member of the Indiana High School Athletic Association (IHSAA) and the Hoosier Crossroads Conference.

Franklin Central High School is home to 12 boys' sports including Baseball, Basketball, Bowling, Cross Country, Football, Golf, Soccer, Swimming and Diving, Tennis, Track and Field, and Wrestling. Franklin Central also features 12 girls' sports including Basketball, Bowling, Cross Country, Golf, Gymnastics, Soccer, Softball, Swimming and Diving, Tennis, Track and Field, Volleyball, and Wrestling.

Franklin Central's stadium, the Franklin Township Athletic Center, is a 13,120-square-foot (1,219 m^{2}) multipurpose facility that is used for football and track and field. The stadium is six stories tall and has seating for 3,500 on the home side. The facility was built in 2004 at a one-time cost of $4.3 million.

State Championships

- Football (1980, 1981, 1982, 1990)
- Boys' Cross Country (1998)

Conference History

Capital District	1960-1970
Central Suburban	1971-1997
Conference Indiana	1998-2017
HCC	2018–Present

=== Performing Arts ===
==== Choirs ====
Franklin Central has a total of 5 concert choirs and 4 show choirs. The 5 concert choirs are Chamber Choir, Accents, Ambassadors, Descants, and Vocal Majority. The 4 show choirs are FC Singers, High Voltage, Encores, and Flight.

==== Bands ====
Franklin Central also has a notable band program. The school has a total of 3 band groups, the Concert band, Symphonic band, and Wind Ensemble, in an order of least to most advanced respectively. The school also has a marching band, the Franklin Central Marching Flashes, who compete in ISSMA's Open Class A group.

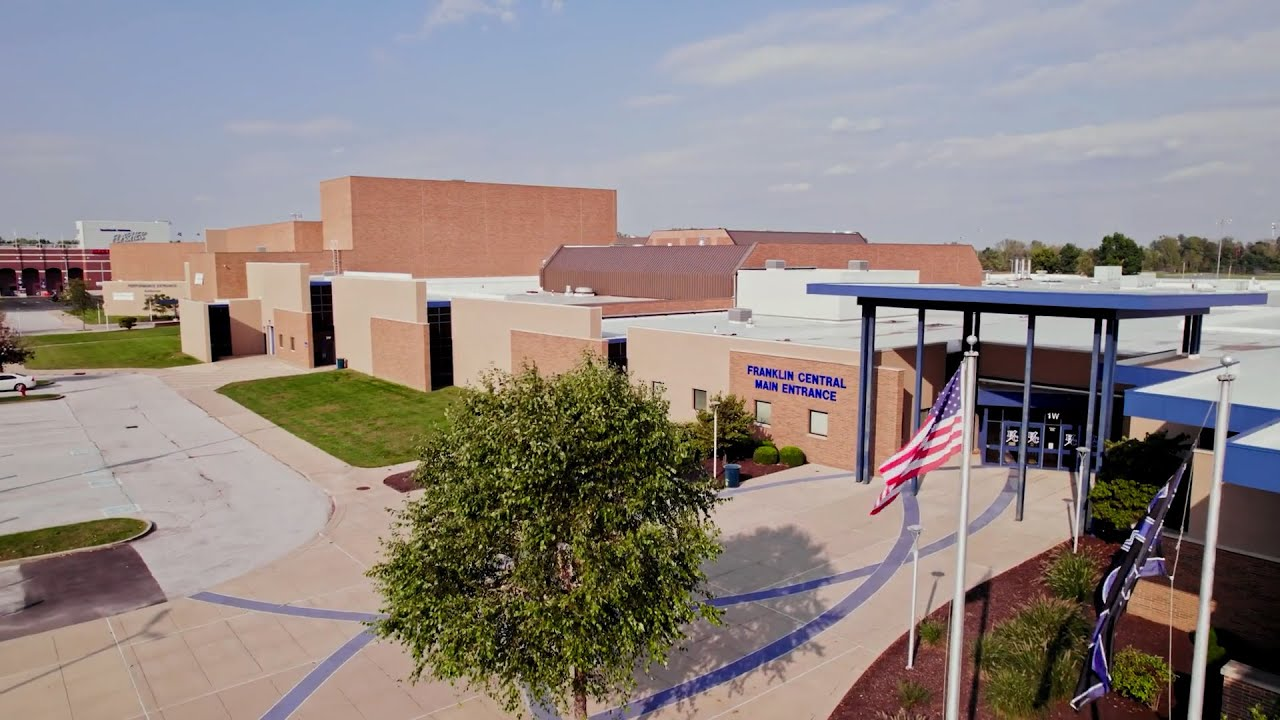
An overhead view of FCHS. (circa pre-2024)

== Notable alumni ==
- Mike Aulby - former member of the PBA and one of only four PBA bowlers to win both a Rookie of the Year and Player of the Year award
- Roger Burkman - current athletic director at Spalding University in Louisville, Kentucky; former NBA player for the Chicago Bulls, member of the Indiana Basketball Hall of Fame
- Jon Elrod - former member of the Indiana House of Representatives from Indiana's 97th House District
- JaJuan Johnson - Darüşşafaka S.K. power forward in the Turkish Basketball Super League
- Jake "Irish" O'Brien - professional mixed martial arts fighter, formerly with the UFC
- Sunungura Rusununguko - former AFL defensive lineman for the Indiana Firebirds, Colorado Crush and New Orleans VooDoo
- Donald Washington - former NFL cornerback for the Kansas City Chiefs
- Seth Maxwell - founder Thirst Project
- Mitch Gore - member of the Indiana House of Representatives from Indiana's 89th House District
- Marcus Burk - professional basketball player
- Javon Small - basketball player
- Walter Lobyn Hamilton - professional artist who has had work featured in the Indiana State Museum and the Indianapolis Museum of Art
- Francesca Zappia - award-winning author of Young Adult fiction

== See also ==
- List of schools in Indianapolis
- List of high schools in Indiana
