= Franklin Township Community School Corporation =

School district in Marion County, Indiana, US

Location
- Indianapolis, Indiana United States

District information
- Type: Public school district
- Grades: K–12
- Established: 1950
- Superintendent: Dr. Chase Huotari

Students and staff
- Students: 11,139 (2022)
- Teachers: 431
- Staff: 1,069
- District mascot: Flashes
- Colors: Royal Blue and White

Other information
- Website: Franklin Township Community School Corporation

Franklin Township Community School Corporation (FTCSC) is a public school district in Franklin Township, Marion County, Indiana, United States. It is responsible for seven elementary schools, two intermediate schools, one junior high school, and one high school. There is also one early learning center. The school district's 2022 enrollment was 11,139 students. Adding to its total, the district built one more elementary school, and a freshman academy addition, which opened in 2009, at the high school to keep up with continued growth.

== Demographics ==
According to the Indiana Department of Education, the district's enrollment population is 82.1% White, 6% Black, 4.9% Multiracial, 4% Hispanic, 2.8% Asian, and 0.3% Native American. The district's gender ratio is 49.2% females to 50.8% males.

== Schools ==
School	Principal	Grades	Enrollment	Coordinates
Wanamaker Early Learning Center	Nichole Webb	ages 3–5	335	
Acton Elementary School	Lindsey Elliot	K–3	400–500	39°39'07.8"N 85°58'23.7"W
New Bethel Elementary School	Meli Drier	PK–3	400–500	
Arlington Elementary School	Matt Nysewander	K–3	541	39°48′35″N 086°04′16″W
Bunker Hill Elementary School	Hilary Huff	K–3	568	39°40′05″N 086°03′05″W
Mary Adams Elementary School	Jakala Greig	K–3	425	
South Creek Elementary School	Patrick Guilfoy	K–3	530	
Thompson Crossing Elementary School	Crystal Livesay	K–3	579	
Lillie Idella Kitley Intermediate School	Josh Madden	4–6	1,427	
Edgewood Intermediate School	Brook Wessel-Burke	4–6	1,282	
Franklin Central Junior High	Natasha Mikus	7–8	1,767	
Franklin Central High School	Zakary Tschiniak	9–12	3,400	39°40′50″N 086°00′59″W

== See also ==
- List of school districts in Indiana
