= Cindy Kirchhofer =

American politician from Indiana

Member of the Indiana House of Representatives from the 89th district
- In office November 16, 2010 – November 16, 2020
- Preceded by: John F. Barnes
- Succeeded by: Mitch Gore

Personal details
- Born: October 6, 1961 (age 64) Beech Grove, Indiana
- Party: Republican

Cindy Kirchhofer (born October 6, 1961) is an American politician who served in the Indiana House of Representatives from the 89th district from 2010 to 2020.
