= Taxation in Indiana =

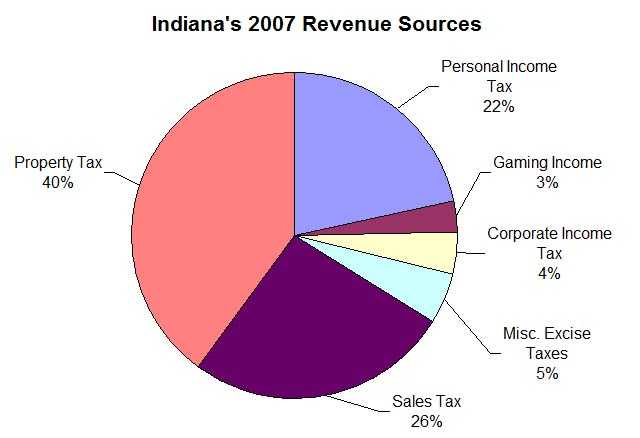
2007 sources of Indiana's revenue

Taxes in Indiana are almost entirely authorized at the state level, although the revenue is used to fund both local and state level government. The state of Indiana's income comes from four primary tax areas. Most state level income is from a sales tax of 7% and a flat state income tax of 3.05%. The state also collects an additional income tax for the 92 counties. Local governments are funded by a property tax that is the sum of rates set by local boards, but the total rate must be approved by the Indiana General Assembly before it can be imposed. Residential property tax rates are capped at maximum of 1% of property value. Excise tax is the fourth form of taxation and is charged on motor vehicles, alcohol, tobacco, gasoline, and certain other forms of movable property; most of the proceeds are used to fund state and local roads and health programs. The Indiana Department of Revenue collects all taxes and pays them out to the appropriate agencies and municipalities. The Indiana Tax Court deals with all tax disputes issues, but decisions can be appealed to the Indiana Supreme Court.

== Income taxes ==
Indiana state budget forecast of 2009
	Actual							Budget			Avg. Ann. Change		
	2000	2001	2002	2003	2004	2005	2006	2007	2008	2009	2000–05	2005–07	2007–09
Start of year balances	1,991	1,638	910	534	720	533	750	1,089	863	799			
Revenues
Sales tax	3,651	3,687	3,761	4,172	4,721	4,960	5,226	5,341	5,578	5,827	6.3%	3.8%	4.4%
Individual income tax	3,753	3,780	3,541	3,644	3,808	4,213	4,322	4,477	4,681	4,934	2.3%	3.1%	5.0%
Corporate income tax	985	855	709	729	645	825	925	908	924	947	-3.5%	4.9%	2.1%
Gaming	-	-	-	431	602	585	590	625	647	678		3.4%	4.1%
All other	810	801	784	1,072	1,143	905	1,370	1,099	1,079	1,071	2.3%	10.1%	-1.3%
Total	9,200	9,123	8,796	10,049	10,918	11,489	12,434	12,450	12,909	13,456	4.5%	4.1%	4.0%

=== Personal income tax ===
Indiana imposes a flat 3.05% tax on the personal income. The base taxable amount is equal to the adjusted gross income determined on a payer's federal tax return. The taxable amount can be lowered by applying several income tax deductions. The largest deductions in 2013 were a $3,000 deduction for rent paid and a deduction equal to the amount of taxes paid out of state. Additional deductions are provided to the elderly and handicapped.

All counties within Indiana also fund their government using an income tax. The highest county income tax in the state is 3.38% and it is charged in addition to the state income tax. County income taxes rate are set by the county board of commissioners and submitted to the Department of Revenue. The department forwards the request to the state legislature where the requested rate must be approved by the Indiana General Assembly.

For most individuals working within Indiana, the state income is withheld from their paycheck. For individuals working outside the state, and for certain types of individuals within the state, quarterly estimated payments are made, with any remaining amount paid when the tax return is filed. If the amount of taxes due at the time of filing is $1,000 or greater, penalty fees and interest charges are assessed in addition to the tax owed.

Income taxes are filed annually by the payer, and must be filed by April 15, or the next business day if the 15th falls on a weekend. Failure to file taxes is a criminal offense. Overpayment of taxes will result in the state issuing a refund of the overpaid amount, or the overpayment can be held as a credit for the next taxing period. In 2008 the personal income tax revenue for the state was $4.68 billion.

=== Corporate income tax ===
In 2014, the Indiana state legislature passed a law that cut the corporate income tax from 8.50% in 2014 to 6.25% in 2016, with further decreases to be phased in until the rate falls to 4.9% in 2022.

Indiana is the only state that imposes corporate income taxes based on fiscal year instead of calendar year.

== Sales tax ==
Indiana imposes a 7% sales tax on most transactions. City governments in the state are also permitted to impose sales taxes. Notable exceptions to the state sales tax are food and prescription drugs. The sales tax is set entirely at the state level, although some of its proceeds are used to fund local government. The state sales tax is consistently the source of the largest percentage of the state government's revenue. In 2008 the tax provided $5.57 billion in revenue.

== Property taxes ==
Indiana property taxes provide the greatest overall income to the state, with almost all of the proceeds going to fund local government. The amount of the tax is determined by different taxing authorities. A portion of the tax is determined by the county board or commissioners, with an additional portion determined by the school district board. Other additional amounts can be imposed by county created boards, including sanitation boards, health department boards, and park and recreation boards. Because of the variety of taxing authorities, property tax rates vary significantly between townships and counties.

The rate of the property tax is determined annually based on the needs of the boards in a given year. The sum of the rate is totaled by the country board of commissioners and submitted to the state government. The proposed property tax rate are submitted to the Indiana Department of Local Government Finance in a report. The department in turn provides the report to the Indiana General Assembly. Before the tax rate can be imposed by the boards, the General Assembly must approve it. The assembly typically approves the rates of several counties, or all the counties at once. In counties where the rate is considered excessive or insufficient, the rate is rejected and the county and boards are required to reassess their needs.

Property tax rates in Indiana are capped a maximum of 1% of value for residential, 2% of value for rental and farmland, and 3% of value for all other types (the actual rates may be higher, but the maximum paid after deductions is capped through a "circuit breaker" tax credit). The property taxes are assessed ad valorem. Payments are made semi-annually, although many individuals and business use escrow accounts to collect the tax on a monthly basis, and are made in the prior years assessed value. Tax deductions can also be claimed on property taxes, the most significant being for businesses located in economic development zones and primary dwelling residence deductions.

In 2005, property tax provided $8.25 billion in revenues to local governments statewide. The assessed taxes are collected by the Department of Local Government Finance and paid out to the accounts of the boards and counties.

== Unemployment taxes ==
The Indiana State Unemployment Tax Act (SUTA) lays out the guidelines for Indiana businesses’ state unemployment tax. The majority of Indiana employers must pay quarterly SUTA contributions, unless the employer is a qualifying not-for-profit or they themselves are the government, at such point that employer can elect to reimburse the state at a time when their business has the means to do just that. Those contributions and reimbursements go to a SUTA trust fund where those funds are only taken out for the payment of unemployment benefits to qualifying employees. Indiana has a wage base of $9,500 unlike the Federal wage base of $7,000.

The rate for an Indiana company is set by the state for their first four years based on the industry they do business in, after such you are evaluated on a host of criteria such as former employees on unemployment. Most new employers in the state of Indiana start with a 2.5% unemployment tax rate unless your company is a construction company, successor company, or a government entity, at which point your tax rate is 2.53%, .5% to 9.4%, 1.6% respectively.

Indiana employers are required to pay unemployment taxes for any year in which they have employees.

== Other taxes ==
The state and local government also receive revenue from a variety of other more minor sources. A gaming tax is imposed on winnings in state casinos, horse tracks, and from the Hoosier Lottery that provided $647 million in revenues in 2008.

Excise taxes are charged on several products. Gasoline is taxed at 18 cents per gallon, with proceeds funding state road projects. An excise tax is also charged based on motor vehicle value at the time of their annual registration with proceeds funding the Bureau of Motor Vehicles and local and state road projects. A tax of 99 cents is levied on packs of cigarettes, and liquor is taxed at $2.68 per gallon. The total income of these and other minor taxes provided $1 billion in revenue in 2008.

== History ==
When statehood was granted to Indiana 1816, the population of the state was sparse and poor. The small economy was entirely agricultural, and the only source of tax revenue available to the state was a property tax. A small bureaucracy was created to oversee the assessment and collection of the tax which was imposed at a fixed rate per acre. The tax provided very little income to the state, and most government activity was funded through public land sale for the first decade. As the state ran into funding problems in 1836, Governor of Indiana Noah Noble proposed reforming the tax system to base the tax ad valorem, enabling the taxes to be collected more cheaply and increasing state income.

Property tax remained the primary source of all state revenue for the next century. It was not until during the Great Depression that Governor Paul V. McNutt advocated the creation of an income tax, that a new form of tax income was created. The law passed in 1933 and immediately became a growing source of state revenue. During the decade, the current system of granting property taxes to local governments, and funding the state government with income taxes was adopted.

In 1962 a constitutional amendment was passed to legalize a state sales tax. The following year, the Indiana General Assembly levied its first sales tax at 2%. The sales tax provided a major boost in state revenues and in the early years was used largely to fund the creation of the modern state highway system. In later years it came to be used more dominantly for education.

By the late 1990s, Indiana property tax rates had begun to increase dramatically, largely due to increased school funding by school boards. In 2002 the average property tax assessment in the state was 8.82%, with some areas in excess of 10% leading to calls for property tax reform. Governor Mitch Daniels ran for office in 2004 advocating reform as part of his platform. During the subsequent legislative session, the General Assembly approved a 1% cap on property tax rates. The change drastically cut local government revenues and a 1 percentage point increase in the state sales tax was approved to offset the difference.
