= Sunungura Rusununguko =

American football player (born 1978)

No. 32, 40, 34
- Position: Defensive lineman

Personal information
- Born: April 12, 1978 (age 48)
- Listed height: 6 ft 3 in (1.91 m)
- Listed weight: 270 lb (122 kg)

Career information
- High school: Indianapolis (IN) Franklin Central
- College: Ball State
- NFL draft: 2001: undrafted

Career history
- Indiana Firebirds (2001–2003); Colorado Crush (2004); Las Vegas Gladiators (2005)*; New Orleans VooDoo (2005); New York Dragons (2006)*; RiverCity Rage (2009)
- * Offseason or practice squad member only

Awards and highlights
- Second-team All-MAC (2000)
- Stats at ArenaFan.com

Sunungura "Gogo" Rusununguko (born April 12, 1978) is an American former professional football player who played four seasons in the Arena Football League (AFL) with the Indiana Firebirds, Colorado Crush and New Orleans VooDoo. He played college football at Ball State University. He was also a member of the Las Vegas Gladiators, New York Dragons and RiverCity Rage.

== Early life ==
Rusununguko attended Franklin Central High School in Indianapolis, Indiana, where he played both as an offensive lineman and defensive lineman.

Rusununguko also competed in wrestling. As a junior, he placed third at the state championships at 215 pounds. As a senior, he posted a perfect 41–0 record and captured the state title at heavyweight.

== College career ==
Rusununguko played for the Ball State Cardinals from 1996 to 2000. He was the co-winner, along with Adrian Reese, of the John Hodge Award for Ball State Outstanding Freshman in 1996 as a defensive tackle. Rusununguko missed the entire 1998 season due to osteomyelitis, a rare bone infection. He earned second team All-Mid-American Conference honors and was a team captain for the Cardinals in 2000.

== Professional career ==
Rusununguko was a member of the Indiana Firebirds of the AFL from 2001 to 2003. He signed with the AFL's Colorado Crush on November 17, 2003. He was traded to the Las Vegas Gladiators on January 20, 2005. However, he was waived by the Gladiators several days later. Rusununguko was signed by the New Orleans VooDoo of the AFL on January 27, 2005. He signed with the AFL's New York Dragons on October 17, 2005. He was released by the Dragons on January 10, 2006. Rusununguko was listed as a fullback/linebacker while playing in the AFL. He played for the RiverCity Rage of the Indoor Football League in 2009.

== Shooting ==
Rusununguko, working as a security guard, was involved in a shooting following a disturbance at an Indianapolis, Indiana bar on January 1, 2008, that left security guard Ronnie Croom dead and four others injured. As of 2011, the case remained unsolved and Rusununguko was arraigned on a gun charge.
