= Poplar Grove, Indianapolis =

Neighborhood in Indianapolis, Indiana, US

Coordinates: 39°42′45″N 86°03′05″W

Poplar Grove is a neighborhood area in Indianapolis, Indiana, United States. Poplar Grove is situated 7 miles (11.3 km) southeast of downtown Indianapolis and is located just beyond the eastern border of Beech Grove in Franklin Township. In the 1800s, Poplar Grove was the location of a railroad post office.

== See also ==
- List of neighborhoods in Indianapolis
