= Poplar Grove, Howard County, Indiana =

Unincorporated community in Indiana, U.S.

Coordinates: 40°33′20″N 86°20′50″W

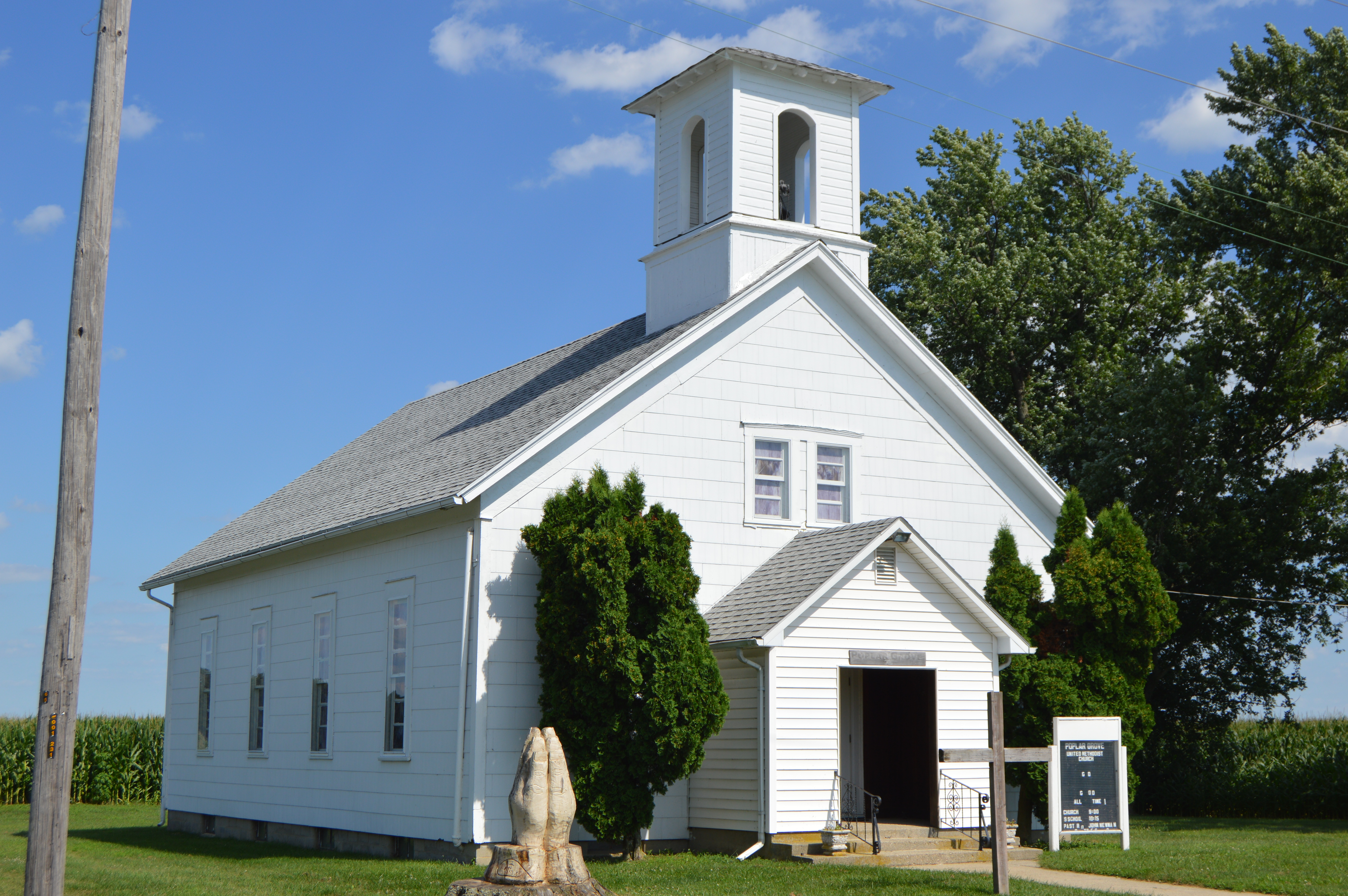
Former Methodist church, last remnant of the community

Poplar Grove is an unincorporated community in Howard County, Indiana, in the United States.

== History ==
Poplar Grove was laid out in 1846. It was named for a large grove of trees at the original town site.
