= Marc Griffin =

American judge (born 1956)

Judge Marc L. Griffin
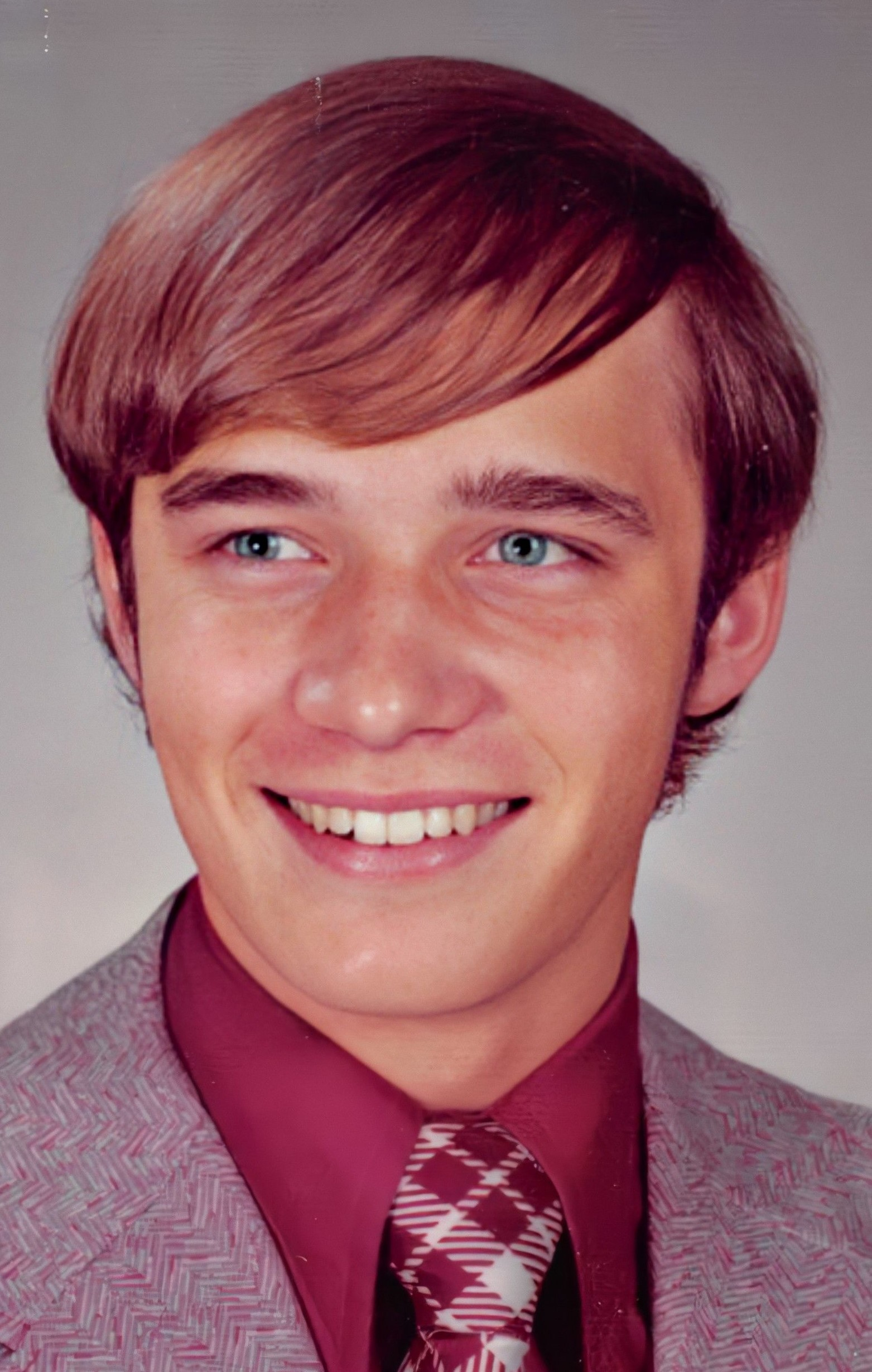
- Griffin in 1974

Justice of the Peace, White River Township, Johnson County, Indiana
- In office February 19, 1974 – December 31, 1975
- Appointed by: Governor Otis Bowen
- Succeeded by: Office abolished

Personal details
- Born: May 25, 1956 (age 69) Greensburg, Indiana, U.S.
- Education: Indiana Wesleyan University (BS); Indiana University Robert H. McKinney School of Law (JD)
- Profession: Lawyer
- Known for: World's youngest judge
- Website: Official website

Marc L. Griffin (born May 25, 1956) is an American lawyer appointed as a judge by the Governor of Indiana in 1974 at the age of 17, presiding over civil and criminal court proceedings.

== Early life and education ==
Griffin was born on May 25, 1956, in Greensburg, Indiana. In 1961, his family relocated to Beech Grove, Indiana.

He completed his secondary education at Beech Grove High School, graduating in 1974. Griffin pursued higher education at Indiana Wesleyan University, where he earned a Bachelor of Science degree in Business Administration. In 1992, he was awarded the degree of Doctor of Jurisprudence by the Indiana University Robert H. McKinney School of Law.

== Judicial career ==
=== Governor's appointment ===
Upon the nomination of the Board of Commissioners of Johnson County, Indiana, Griffin was appointed and commissioned as a Justice of the Peace by Indiana Governor Otis Bowen on February 19, 1974. This appointment was made to fill a vacancy in the office for White River Township, Johnson County, Indiana. His appointment made him the world's youngest judge to preside over civil and criminal court proceedings.

=== Indiana Attorney General opinion ===
After appointing Griffin as a Justice of the Peace, Governor Bowen requested an official opinion from Indiana Attorney General Theodore Sendak regarding the applicability of age eligibility laws to Griffin's appointment. On March 19, 1974, Sendak issued Official Opinion No. 1 of 1974, in which he concluded that, as a 17-year-old, Griffin was not legally old enough to take the oath of office as a Justice of the Peace in Indiana. Although the Attorney General's opinion was advisory and did not automatically remove Griffin from office, it created the potential for a legal challenge.

The Associated Press extensively reported on the opinion, resulting in widespread coverage in newspapers across the United States. Many publications presented the story with attention-grabbing headlines, particularly emphasizing the legal controversy surrounding a recent marriage officiated by Griffin and its broader implications.

In response, Griffin and the Johnson County Board of Commissioners sought a legal opinion from the county attorney. Contrary to the Attorney General's position, the county attorney found no legal impediment to Griffin holding office. Furthermore, the county attorney offered to represent both the Commissioners and Griffin should the appointment face a legal challenge.

=== Judicial opinion and election victories ===
In the 1974 Republican primary election for Justice of the Peace in White River Township, the Johnson County Election Board permitted Griffin to file as a candidate despite the opinion issued by the Attorney General. Robert W. Condit also filed as a candidate in the election.

Before the election, Condit initiated a lawsuit against the Election Board in the Johnson Superior Court, asserting that the board had acted unlawfully by accepting Griffin's candidacy. The lawsuit cited Sendak's official opinion, arguing that Griffin was ineligible to run due to age restrictions. It further noted that the Election Board approved Griffin's candidacy six days after Sendak issued his opinion. By mutual agreement of the parties involved for a change of venue, the case was transferred to the Shelby County Circuit Court.

Griffin defeated Condit despite the pending lawsuit challenging his candidacy. After his defeat, Condit was asked by the news media whether he intended to continue legal proceedings. He amended his lawsuit to include Griffin as a defendant. The court ruled that the Attorney General's opinion did not accurately interpret the law. The judicial decision affirmed Griffin's eligibility both as a candidate and to hold office.

Griffin won the 1974 general election against Michael A. Hunter, securing a four-year term beginning in 1975, allowing him to remain in office after the expiration of his appointive term.

=== Justice of the Peace court ===
On April 6, 1974, Griffin formally opened his courtroom in Greenwood, Indiana, and presided over cases for the first time.

As a Justice of the Peace, he adjudicated civil small claims matters including debt collection, dishonored checks, landlord-tenant disputes, and property damage claims. His criminal docket encompassed misdemeanor cases such as vehicle moving violations, breach of the peace, shoplifting, and assault.

Additionally, Griffin conducted surety of the peace hearings and issued peace bonds, now commonly referred to as protective orders. He was also legally authorized to officiate civil marriages a duty he performed despite being younger than the legal marriage age in Indiana.

=== Abolition of the Justice of the Peace Courts ===
Griffin's tenure as Justice of the Peace ended on December 31, 1974, upon the expiration of his appointive term. On November 5, 1974, following a contested general election, he was elected to a four-year term scheduled to begin on January 1, 1975.

However, his elected tenure was prematurely terminated due to legislative action by the Indiana General Assembly, which enacted a law abolishing Justice of the Peace courts statewide, effective January 1, 1976. As a result, Griffin's elective term, originally set to run until December 31, 1978, was cut short after just one year, ending on December 31, 1975.

In response to this legislative change, the Indiana Justice of the Peace Association initiated legal proceedings, challenging the constitutionality of the newly established court system intended to replace the Justice of the Peace courts. The lawsuit sought an injunction to prevent the implementation of the legislation, arguing that the law, passed by the 1975 General Assembly, unconstitutionally eliminated the existing system in favor of a county court framework. Griffin provided testimony in support of the litigation and advocated for a restraining order to block state funding for the new courts.

Despite these efforts, the legal challenge was unsuccessful, and the legislation was upheld. Consequently, Griffin's elective term, which was supposed to extend through 1978, officially ended on December 31, 1975, just one year into the expected four-year tenure.

== Bar admissions and legal career ==
Unlike most judges, Griffin was admitted to the bar after his judicial career had concluded. In 1993, he was admitted to the bar of the Indiana Supreme Court, United States District Court for the Northern District of Indiana, United States District Court for the Southern District of Indiana, and the United States Court of Appeals for the Seventh Circuit. In 1996, he was admitted as an attorney and counselor of the Supreme Court of the United States.

Griffin began his legal career as a solo practitioner in Indianapolis during his first year of practice. From 1994 to 1997 served as a partner at Griffin & Smith in Indianapolis. Subsequently, from 1998 to 2021, he was a partner at Griffin, Hicks & Hicks in Greenwood, Indiana. His legal practice primarily focused on real estate law.
