= Josh Fryar =

American football player (born 2002)

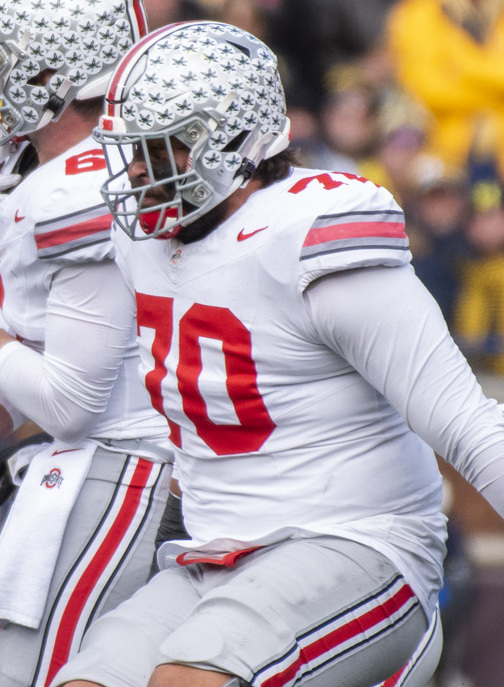
- Fryar with the Ohio State Buckeyes in 2023

No. 78 – Arizona Cardinals
- Position: Offensive tackle
- Roster status: Active

Personal information
- Born: February 12, 2002 (age 24); Beech Grove, Indiana, U.S.
- Listed height: 6 ft 5 in (1.96 m)
- Listed weight: 320 lb (145 kg)

Career information
- High school: Beech Grove (IN)
- College: Ohio State (2020–2024)
- NFL draft: 2025: undrafted

Career history
- Arizona Cardinals (2025–present)

Awards and highlights
- CFP national champion (2024); First-team All-Big Ten (2023)

Career NFL statistics as of Week 5, 2026
- Games played: 14
- Games started: 5
- Stats at Pro Football Reference

Josh Fryar (born February 12, 2002) is an American professional football offensive tackle for the Arizona Cardinals of the National Football League (NFL). He played college football for the Ohio State Buckeyes.

== Early life ==
Fryar attended Beech Grove High School in Beech Grove, Indiana. He was a three-star recruit and had scholarship offers from Alabama, Florida State, Iowa State, Michigan State, Oklahoma, Ohio State, Oregon, Penn State, Washington State, West Virginia, and Wisconsin. He committed to play college football for the Ohio State Buckeyes.

== College career ==
Fryar was redshirted as a freshman in 2020. He played 12 games in 2021 before tearing his ACL. During the 2022 season, Fryar got his first career start at guard against Indiana. Fryar earned the starting left tackle spot heading into the 2023 season, and earned first-team all-Big Ten Conference honors.

== Professional career ==
Pre-draft measurables
| Height | Weight | Arm length | Hand span | Wingspan | 40-yard dash | 10-yard split | 20-yard split | 20-yard shuttle | Three-cone drill | Vertical jump | Broad jump |
|---|---|---|---|---|---|---|---|---|---|---|---|
| 6 ft 4 7/8 in (1.95 m) | 318 lb (144 kg) | 34 7/8 in (0.89 m) | 9 3/4 in (0.25 m) | 6 ft 10 7/8 in (2.11 m) | 5.09 s | 1.69 s | 2.94 s | 4.69 s | 7.69 s | 34.0 in (0.86 m) | 8 ft 11 in (2.72 m) |
All values from Pro Day

On April 28, 2025, after going unselected in the 2025 NFL draft, Fryar signed with the Arizona Cardinals as an undrafted free agent.
