= Mozel Sander Projects =

Public housing development in Indianapolis, Indiana, US

Coordinates: 39°49′54″N 86°06′33″W

The Mozel Sanders Homes is a housing development located on the near north-eastside of Indianapolis.

The development was originally built in the 1940s as Meadowbrook Apartments.

They were the heart of a once-flourishing, streetcar suburban neighborhood known as simply "The Meadows". Today, as of 2006, The Meadows is the most blighted neighborhood in Indianapolis and suffers from very severe urban decay and blight. All but seven of the original twenty-two buildings remain standing.

The area has suffered from extraordinarily high crime, including (at one point in time) having the reputation of being the city's worst neighborhood. Several efforts have been made in turning the area in the right direction, starting with several federal grants, and the demolition of Parkwood Projects, formerly situated to the east of Mozel Sanders. The entire neighborhood is slated for demolition, and a new, urban renewal type of neighborhood will replace it, which will be similar in nature to Fall Creek Place, also in Indianapolis.
