= Center Township, Marion County, Indiana =

Center Township Marion County
- Township
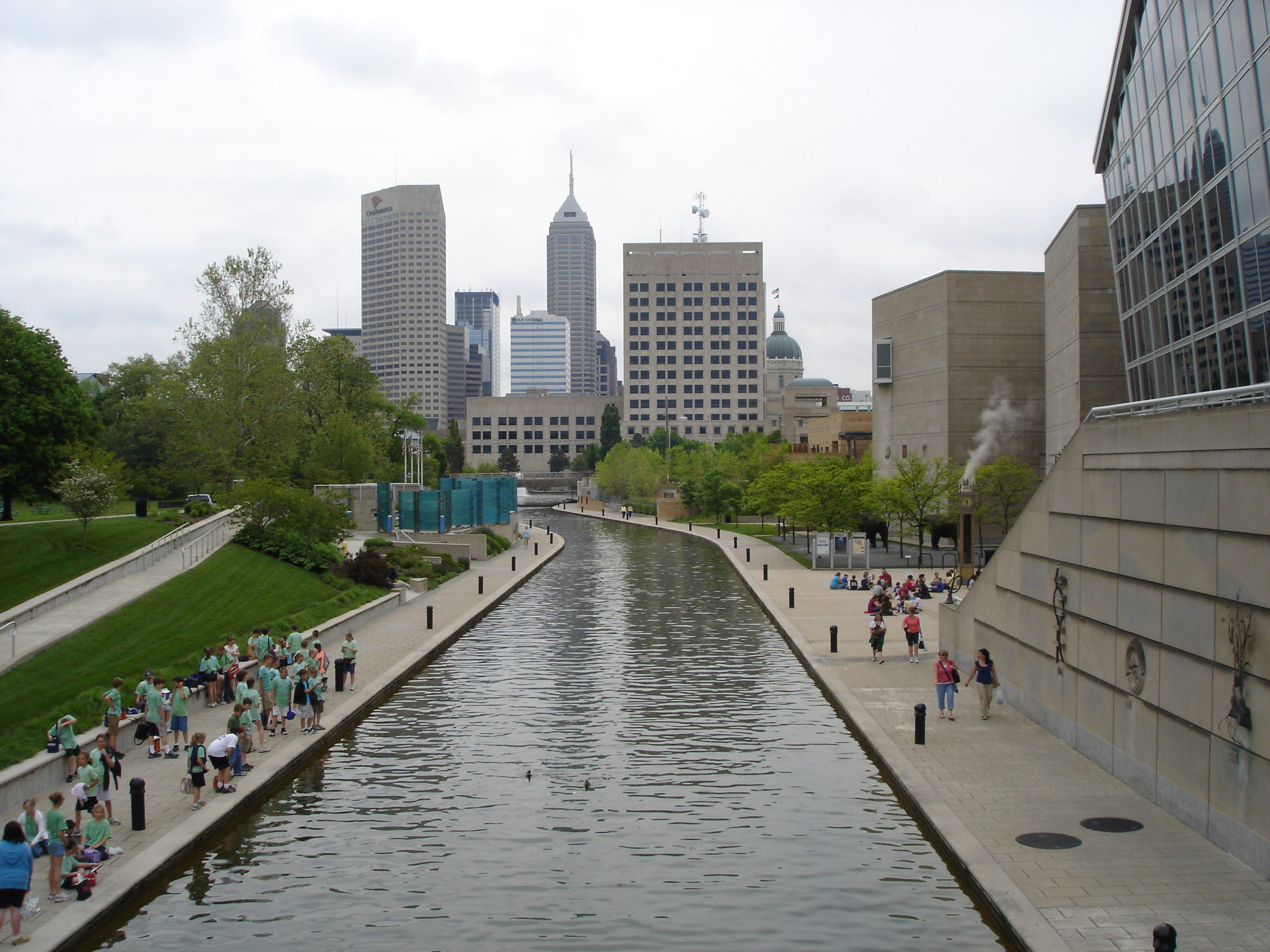
- Downtown Indianapolis

- Seal

- Location in Marion County
- Coordinates: 39°46′25″N 86°08′22″W
- Country: United States
- State: Indiana
- County: Marion

Government
  - Type: Indiana township
  - Trustee: Eugene A. Akers

Area
  - Total: 42.7 sq mi (111 km^{2})
  - Land: 41.85 sq mi (108.4 km^{2})
  - Water: 0.84 sq mi (2.2 km^{2}) 1.97%
- Elevation: 715 ft (218 m)

Population (2020)
  - Total: 153,549
  - Density: 3,411.6/sq mi (1,317.2/km^{2})
- ZIP codes: 46107, 46201, 46202, 46203, 46204, 46205, 46208, 46217, 46218, 46219, 46221, 46222, 46225, 46237
- GNIS feature ID: 0453186
- Website: www.in.gov/townships/center49/

Center Township is one of nine townships in Marion County, Indiana, in the United States. As of the 2020 census, its population was 153,549, up from 142,787 in 2010, and it contained 80,885 housing units. It is the most populated township in Marion County.

Center Township includes downtown Indianapolis and part of Beech Grove.

== Geography ==
Historical population
Census	Pop.	Note	%±
1890	117,328		—
1900	167,970		43.2%
1910	218,497		30.1%
1920	283,414		29.7%
1930	300,073		5.9%
1940	314,505		4.8%
1950	337,211		7.2%
1960	333,351		−1.1%
1970	273,634		−17.9%
1980	208,624		−23.8%
1990	182,140		−12.7%
2000	167,055		−8.3%
2010	142,787		−14.5%
2020	153,549		7.5%
2021 (est.)	152,629		−0.6%
Source: US Decennial Census

According to the 2010 census, the township has a total area of 42.7 square miles (111 km^{2}), of which 41.85 square miles (108.4 km^{2}) (or 98.01%) is land and 0.84 square miles (2.2 km^{2}) (or 1.97%) is water.

=== Municipalities ===
- Beech Grove (northern quarter)
- Indianapolis (partial)

=== Communities ===
- Belmont at 39.752266°N 86.194988°W
- Clifton at 39.816153°N 86.183044°W
- Crown Hill
- Downtown
- Fountain Square
- Haughville (small portion)
- Ingallston at 39.725044°N 86.084707°W
- Little Flower
- Martindale-Brightwood
- Meadows (south half)
- North Indianapolis at 39.807820°N 86.178043°W
- Old Northside
- Riverside (vast majority)
- South Village
- White River State Park
- Woodruff Place at 39.777543°N 86.128319°W

=== Extinct communities ===
- Babe Denny at 39.755481°N 86.164663°W
- Brightwood at 39.803653°N 86.109708°W
- Clifford Park at 39.788931°N 86.088041°W

(These towns are listed as "historical" by the USGS.)

=== Cemeteries ===
The township contains five notable cemeteries: Concordia, Crown Hill, Hebrew, Holy Cross and Saint Joseph, and New Crown.

=== Major highways ===
- Interstate 65
- Interstate 70

=== Airports and landing strips ===
- ISHC Landing Pad
- Indiana Department of Natural Resources Airport
- Indianapolis Downtown Heliport
- Methodist Hospital Helistop

=== Lakes ===
- Sullivan Lake

== Notable people ==
- Donie Bush, longtime Major League Baseball player, manager, and scout.
- Wilbur D'Alene, racing driver
- Julia Carson, former U.S. Representative and onetime Center Township Trustee.
- André Carson, current Representative for Indiana's 7th Congressional District, grandson of Julia Carson.

== School districts ==
- Beech Grove City Schools
- Indianapolis Public Schools

== Political districts ==
- Indiana's 7th congressional district
- State House District 100
- State House District 86
- State House District 96
- State House District 97
- State House District 98
- State House District 99
- State Senate District 31
- State Senate District 32
- State Senate District 33
- State Senate District 34
- State Senate District 35
- State Senate District 36

== See also ==
- National Register of Historic Places listings in Center Township, Marion County, Indiana
