= Fall Creek Place, Indianapolis =

Neighborhood in Indianapolis, Indiana, US

Fall Creek Place
- Neighborhood Area of Indianapolis
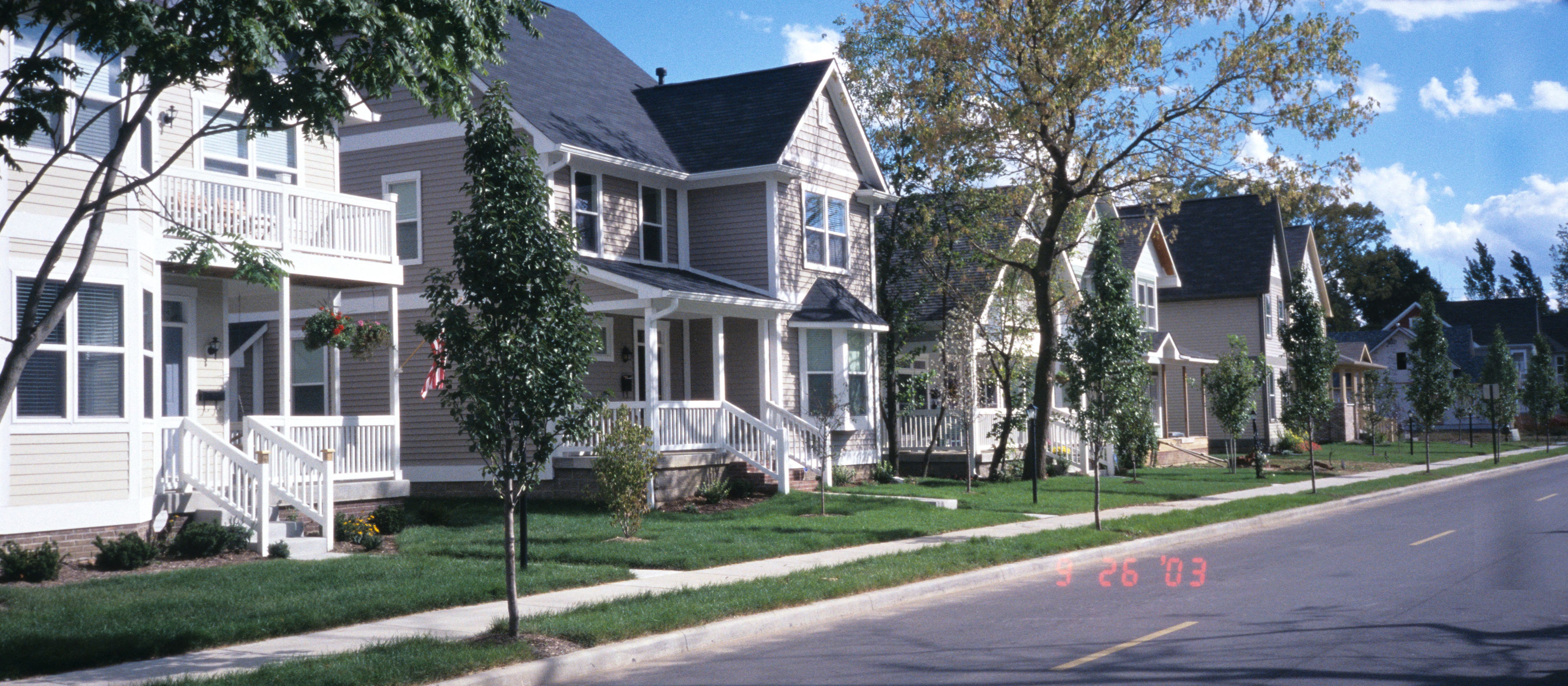
- Single-family homes along North Pennsylvania Street (2003)
- Interactive map of Fall Creek Place
- Coordinates: 39°48′06″N 86°09′01″W
- Country: United States
- State: Indiana
- County: Marion
- Townships: Center
- City: Indianapolis
- Time zone: UTC−5 (EST)
  - Summer (DST): UTC−4 (EDT)
- ZIP codes: 46205
- Area code: 317 / 463

Fall Creek Place is one of many revitalized neighborhoods in Center Township, Indianapolis, Indiana, United States. The neighborhood mainly consists of tree-line, residential streets, with nodes of commercial along its boundaries. Victorian homes from the late 19th century are the most prevalent house type as well as new build construction of period design.

The neighborhood is bounded by Meridian Street (west), Fall Creek Parkway (north), the alley east of College Avenue (east), and 22nd Street (south). Before the project's Phase IV began in 2006, its eastern boundary was Park Avenue.

In the 1980s, the neighborhood fell into serious disrepair; entire city blocks were left abandoned. In 2001, city efforts to redevelop the area into a mixed-income residential community began. In 2003, the U.S. Department of Housing and Urban Development awarded Indianapolis with a Homeownership Zone Award for the way the city used a $4 million HUD grant to stimulate other public and private investment in the Fall Creek Place redevelopment. Also in 2003, the American Planning Association selected Fall Creek Place as the winner of the 2003 Outstanding Planning Award for "Implementing Smart Growth." In 2006, the National League of Cities gave Indianapolis the silver winner Award for Municipal Excellence for cities over 500,000 in population for the Fall Creek Place redevelopment project. and

The area was previously nicknamed "Dodge City," referring to the infamous western town of Dodge City, Kansas, where there were shootouts in the streets. The area was plagued with frequent drive-bys during the 1980s and 1990s.

K-6 students are zoned to Indianapolis Public Schools 27 and 60.

== See also ==
- List of neighborhoods in Indianapolis
