= Beech Grove High School =

Public high school in Indiana, United States

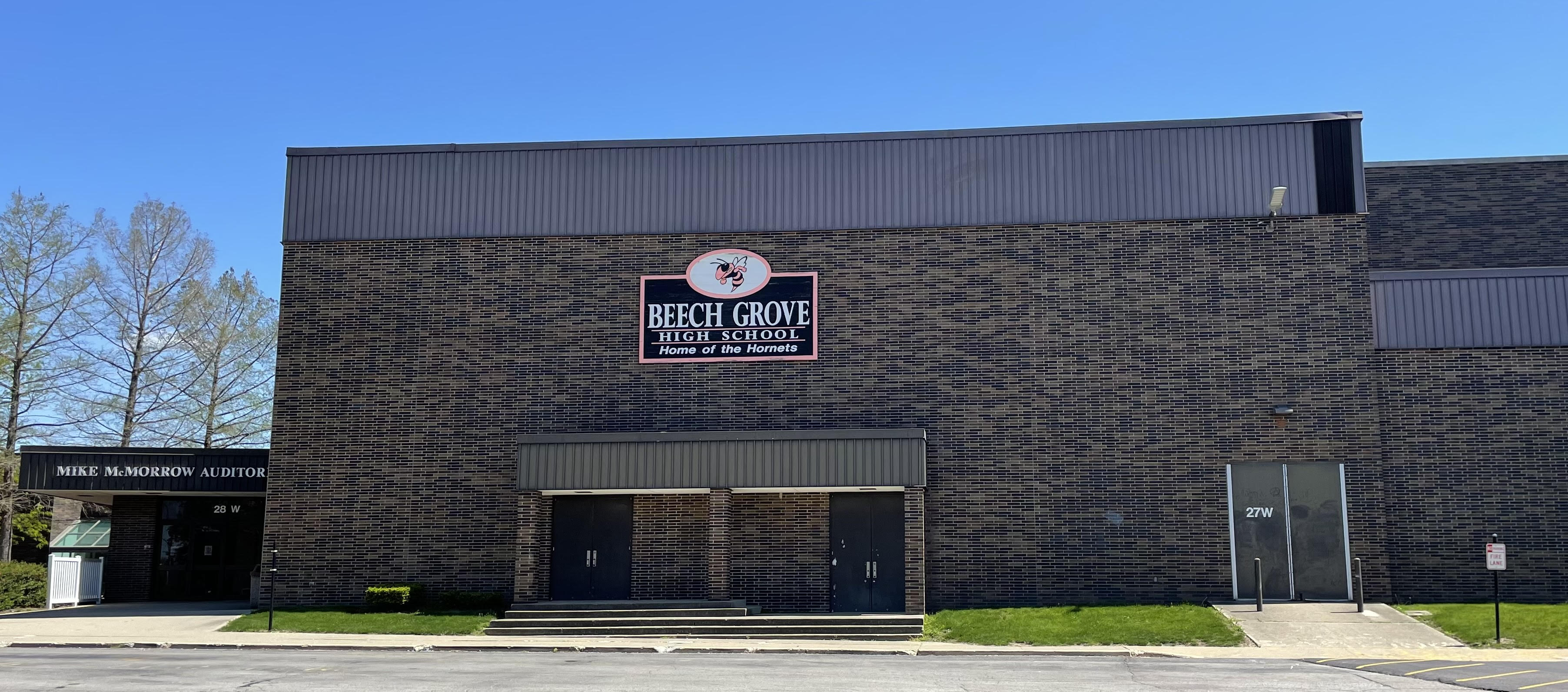
- Front of Beech Grove High School

Location
- 5330 Hornet Avenue; Beech Grove, Indiana 46107; United States; 39°42′40″N 86°04′35″W

Information
- Type: Public high school
- Motto: "Building a Culture of Excellence."
- Principal: Trenton Austin
- Teaching staff: 57.33 (FTE)
- Grades: 9-12
- Enrollment: 892 (2023-2024)
- Student to teacher ratio: 15.56
- Color
- Athletics conference: Indiana Crossroads Conference
- Team name: Hornets
- Website: bgcs.k12.in.us/o/beech-grove-high-school

Beech Grove High School is a public high school in Beech Grove, Indiana, United States.

== About ==
Beech Grove High School is part of the Beech Grove City Schools. The school currently enrolls students from grades 9 through 12. The school is operated by the Beech Grove City Schools.

== History ==
Beech Grove High School began in 1917 in a red brick building at the corner of Tenth and Main streets, which was razed in 1957 to make room for expanding Central Elementary School. The high school moved to a new building at 1248 Buffalo Street in 1955, where it shared facilities with the junior high school until the present at 5330 Hornet Avenue was completed in 1966. Beech Grove High School has grown from a six-member graduation class in 1921 with seven faculty members to 150 graduates in 1999 with 50 faculty members and administrators. The high school has graduated a total of 7,728 students in the last 79 years. The first high school band was organized in 1951, boys basketball and track in 1920, eleven man football in 1944, wrestling and cross country in 1957, baseball in 1959, golf and tennis in 1965, swimming in 1977, soccer in 1994 and their newest sport, bowling in 1999. The girls Indiana High School Athletic Association sponsored sports program began with volleyball in 1971, track in 1973, basketball in 1975, tennis and swimming in 1977, softball in 1987 and golf and soccer in 1977. Prior to these recognitions, many girls participated in sporting competitions sponsored by the Girls Athletic Association.

== Demographics ==
Of Beech Grove's 701 students (2007–08 school year), 87% were white, 5% were black, 3% were Hispanic, 1% were Asian, and 3% were multiracial. 23% of students qualified for free lunches and 9% qualified for reduced price lunches.

== Athletics ==
The mascot of Beech Grove High School is the Hornet; the school colors are orange and black. The Hornets won the 2003 Girls Basketball AAA State Championship led by future WNBA player Katie Gearlds. In 2022 The Boys Basketball team won the AAA State Championship under leadership by Coach Mike Renfro. The following offseason, Coach Renfro was arrested for operating a vehicle while intoxicated, possession of cocaine, and dealing cocaine. Shortly after the arrest he resigned as coach of the team.

Conference History

Conference	Years
Marion County 6-man	1940-1944
Capital District	1945-1970
Central Suburban	1971-1977
Mid-State	1978-2004
Marion County	1979-1979
Indiana Crossroads	2005-2022

== Noted alumni ==
- Brian Bosma - American politician
- Josh Fryar - Football player (Arizona Cardinals)
- Katie Gearlds – American basketball player and coach (born 1984) - Current head coach of Purdue Boilermakers women's basketball 2003 Indiana Miss Basketball and former WNBA player for the Seattle Storm
- Marc Griffin – American judge (born 1956)

== See also ==
- List of high schools in Indiana
