= The Southside Times =

Newspaper in Marion and Johnson counties in Indiana, U.S.

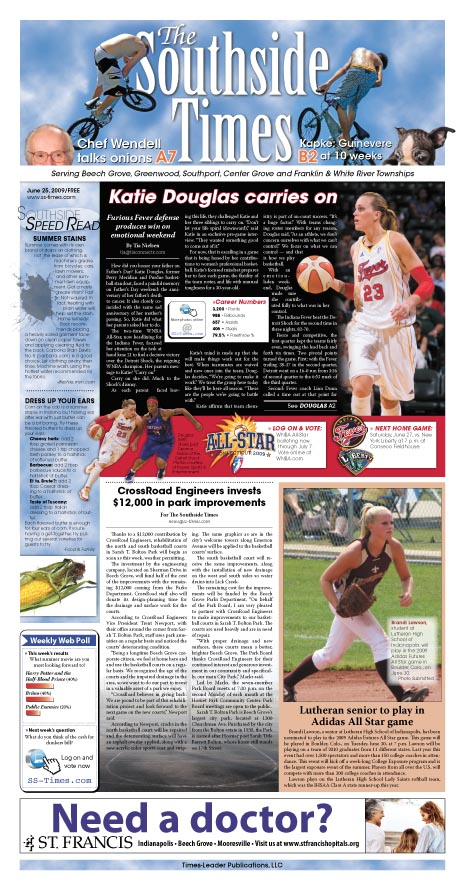
- The June 25, 2009 front page of The Southside Times
- Type: Weekly newspaper
- Format: Tabloid
- Owner: Times-Leader LLC
- Publisher: Rick Myers
- Editor: Nicole Davis
- Founded: 1928
- Headquarters: 7670 US 31 South; Indianapolis, Indiana 46227; U.S.
- Circulation: 17,500 Weekly
- Website: www.ss-times.com

The Southside Times is a weekly newspaper that began publishing in 1928. The newspaper delivers community news to Beech Grove, Greenwood, Southport, and Center Grove, and Franklin, Perry, and White River townships.

Published every Thursday, 17,500 copies are delivered to the greater south side of Indianapolis and its suburbs either to newsstands or through home delivery. Places the paper is delivered to include University of Indianapolis, several Kroger supermarkets, McDonald's restaurants, and several locally owned businesses. The Southside Times sells to many advertisers, allowing the paper to be available at no cost.

Current employees include editor-in-chief Nicole Davis, Director of New Business Development Grady Gaynor, digital consultant Andrew Angle, and sales manager Mark Gasper.

As of November 2012, the paper relocated from its longtime Beech Grove location in favor of a house on the south side of Indianapolis on US 31. The paper also switched to a tabloid format instead of the traditional broadsheet format in January 2013.

== Sections ==
For the Record - This features obituaries and also may feature wedding announcements and anniversaries.
Opinion - Contains letters to the editor, Torry's Top 10 (a weekly feature by Torry Stiles), a political cartoon and editorials.
Pets - Published every third Thursday of the month, this section includes articles from veterinarians and brief blurbs from shelters about animals up for adoption.
Night and Day - Contains calendar events from all around the South Side, a weekly movie review by Perry Township resident Adam Staten and local dining options and reviews by Southside residents.
Community - Usually contains announcements, such as community projects, high school students' achievements, business endeavors, local colleges and college students from the paper's coverage area's activities and government meetings.
Living - Publishes columns about nutrition and cooking. Contributors include Chef Wendell Fowler.
