= Beech Grove Shops =

Railroad maintenance facility in Beech Grove, Indiana, U.S.

Coordinates: 39°43′11″N 86°4′40″W

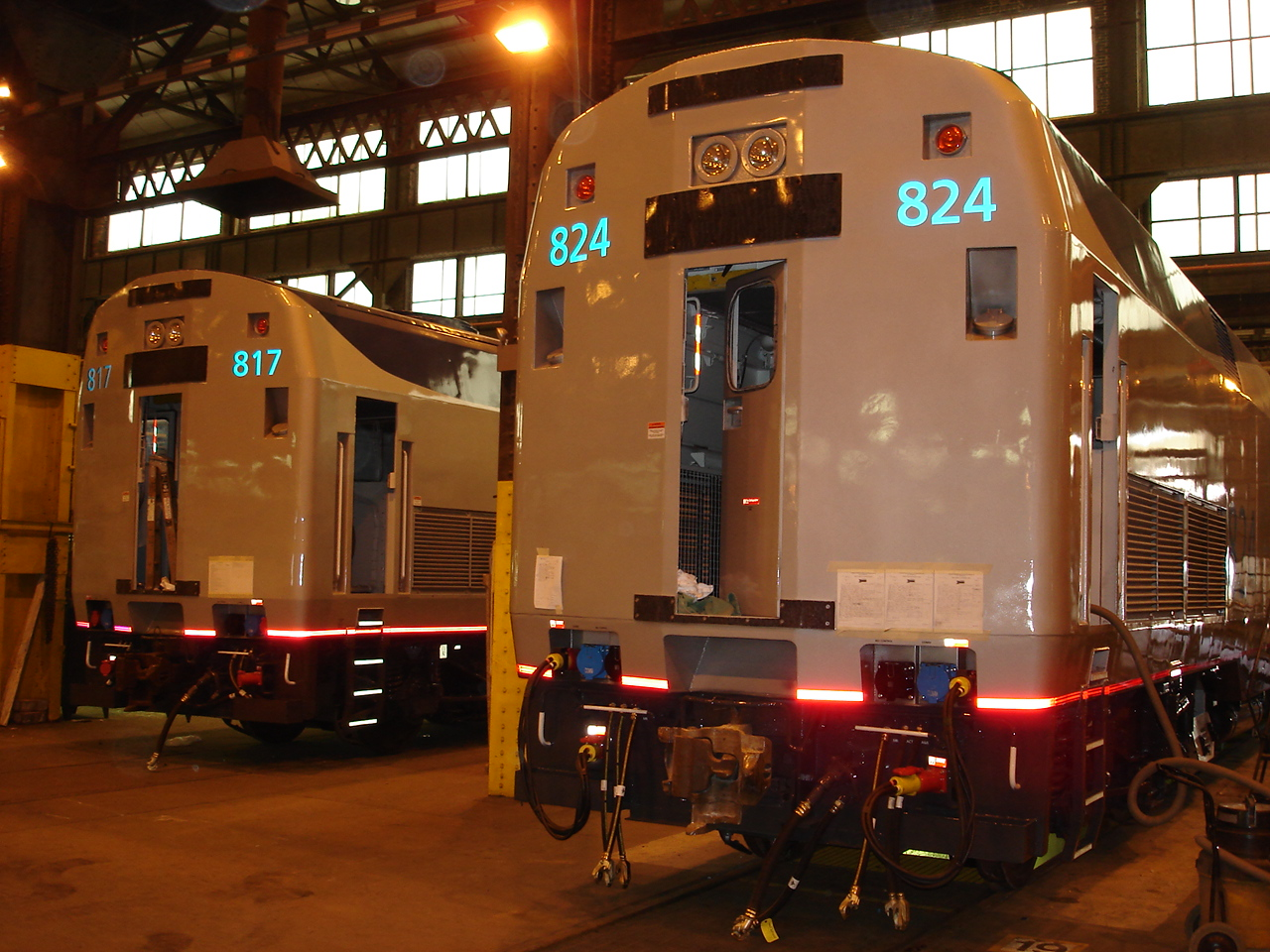
Rebuilt GE P40DCs 817 and 824 at Beech Grove in 2010.

The Beech Grove Shops is a railway maintenance facility in Beech Grove, Indiana, an enclave on the southeast side of Indianapolis. Beech Grove is Amtrak's primary maintenance facility. It also contains a very large freight yard.

== History ==
The shops were originally constructed in 1904–1908 by the Cleveland, Cincinnati, Chicago & St Louis Railway (the "Big Four"), servicing a network stretching across the Midwest into Illinois, Indiana, Michigan, and Ohio. The facility was used as the company's repair shop for steam locomotives and passenger and freight cars.

The Big Four was acquired by the New York Central Railroad (NYC) in 1906, but operated as an independent business until it was formally merged with its owner in 1922. The facility passed to Penn Central Transportation in 1968 when the NYC merged with the Pennsylvania Railroad. Penn Central declared bankruptcy in 1970. Amtrak purchased the facility from the bankrupt Penn Central in April 1975.

On September 20, 2002, an F2 tornado hit the shops, damaging Coach Shop 3, which was going to be torn down after the tornado; it had been used to overhaul Superliner passenger cars until 2000.

In the early hours of May 2, 2021, two storage buildings on the site were destroyed by a fire.

== Gallery ==
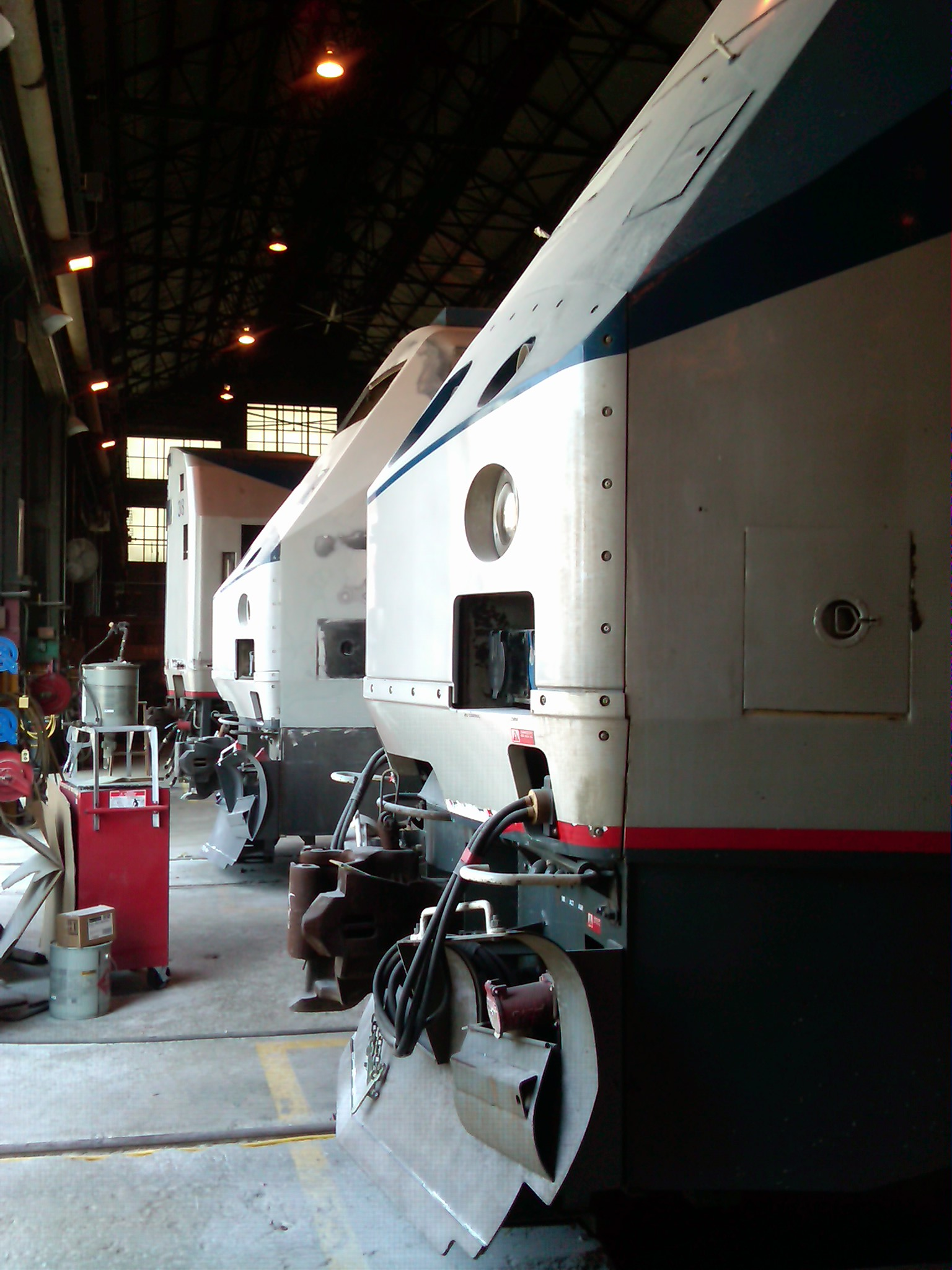
Amtrak P42's under repair at Beech Grove

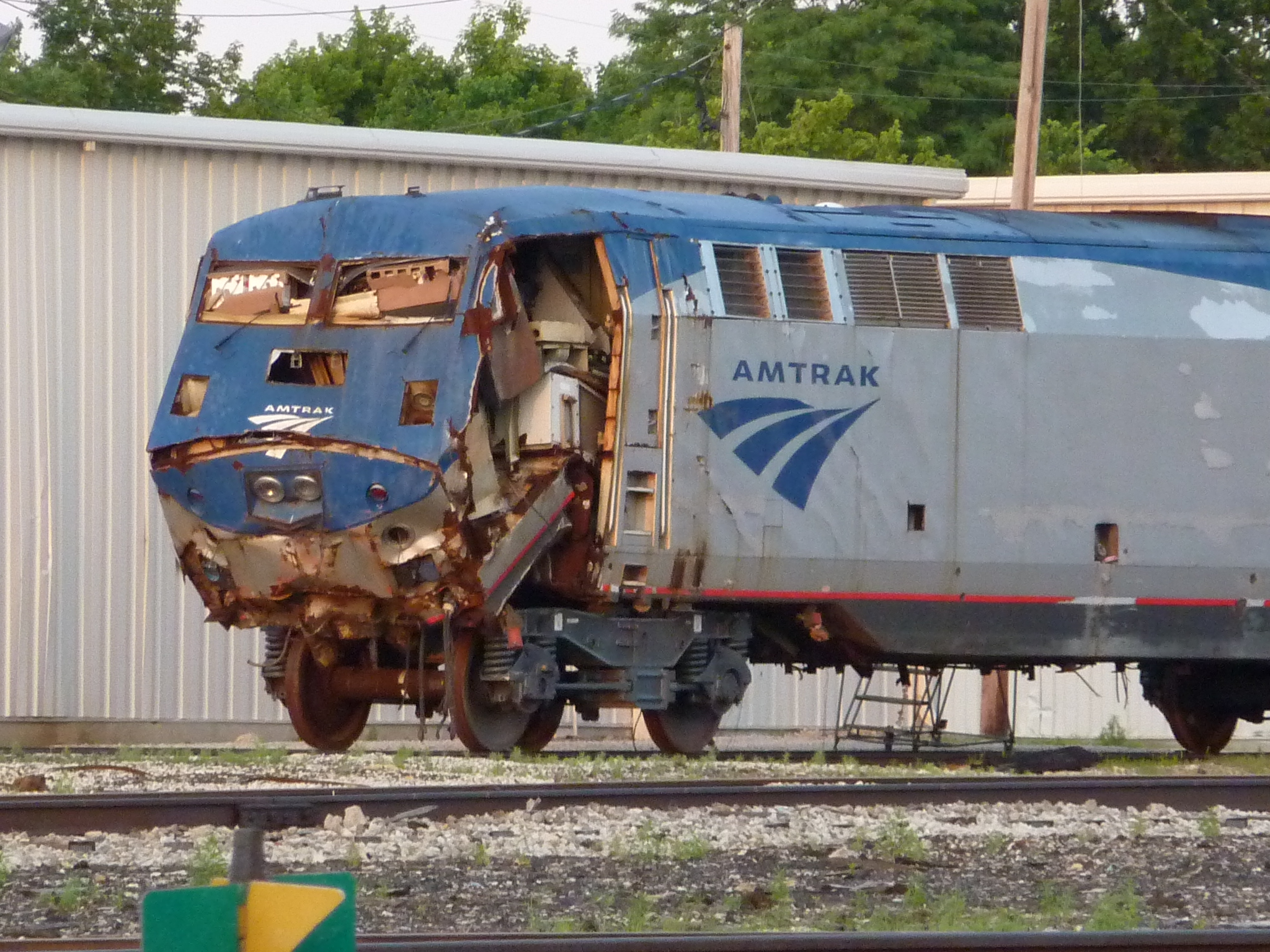
Damaged Amtrak P42 #8 at Beech Grove after a collision with a Norfolk Southern freight in 2007.

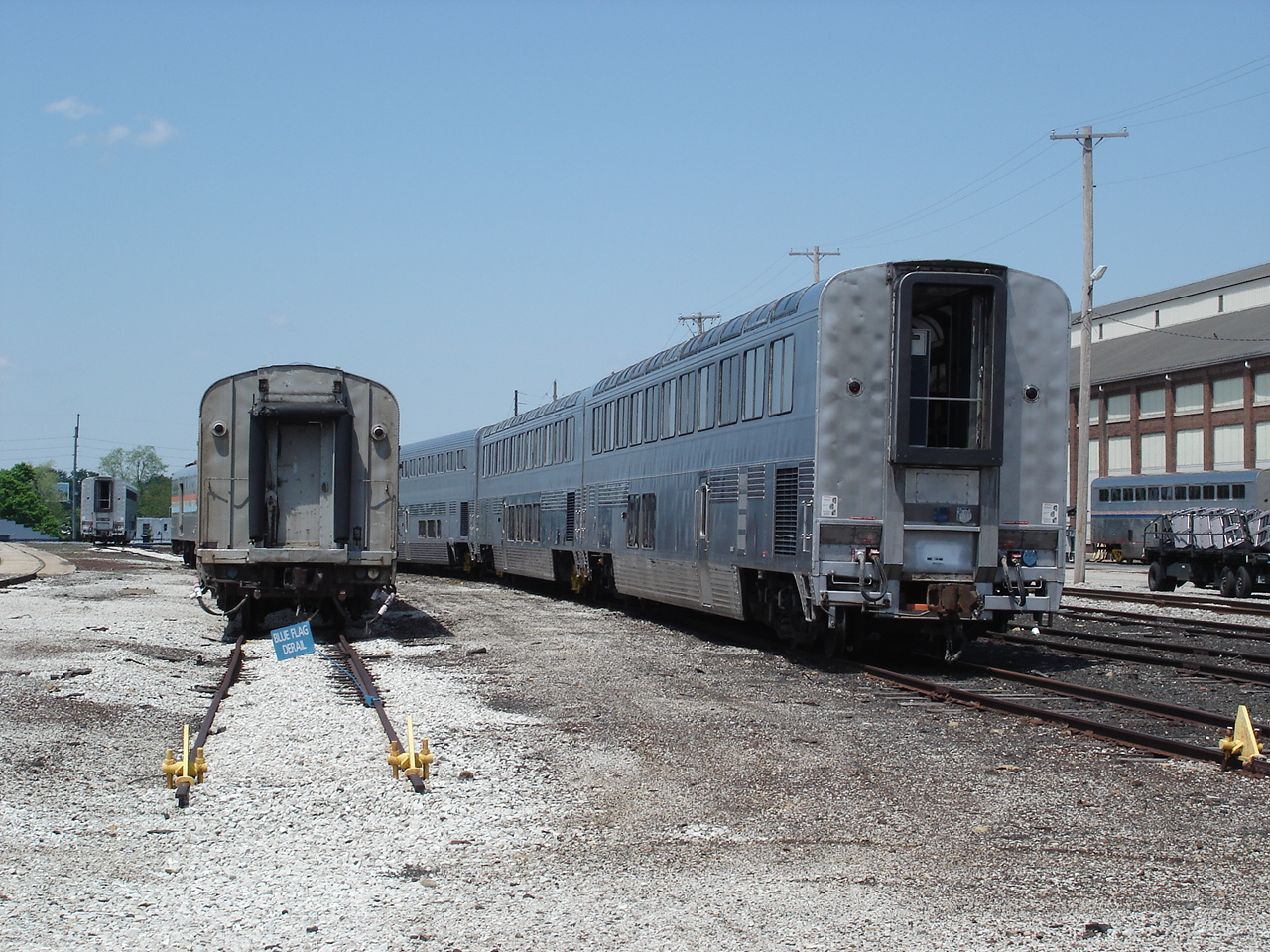
Amtrak equipment at Beech Grove shops.

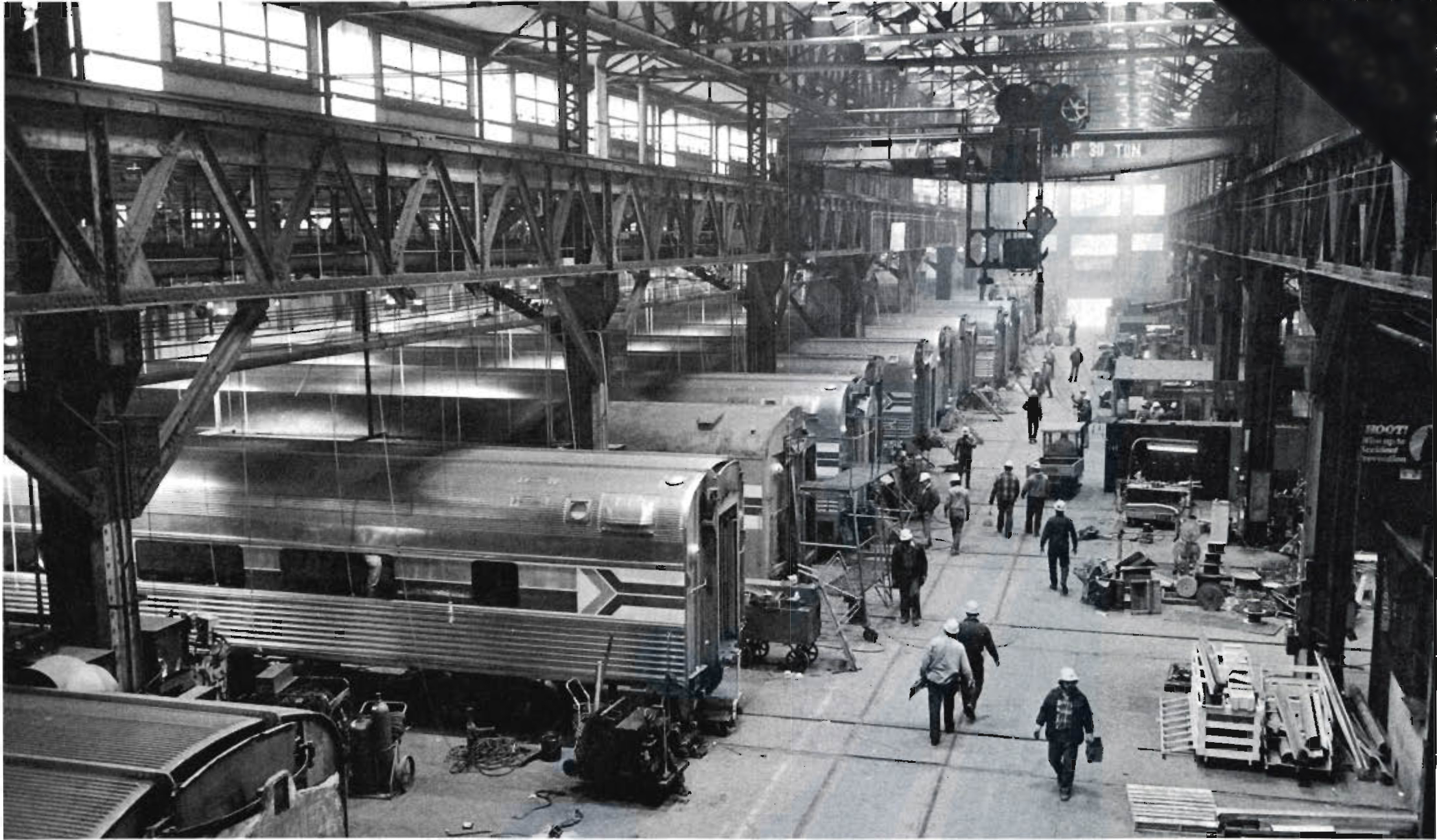
The shops in the 1980s
