= Beech Grove, Indiana =

- City
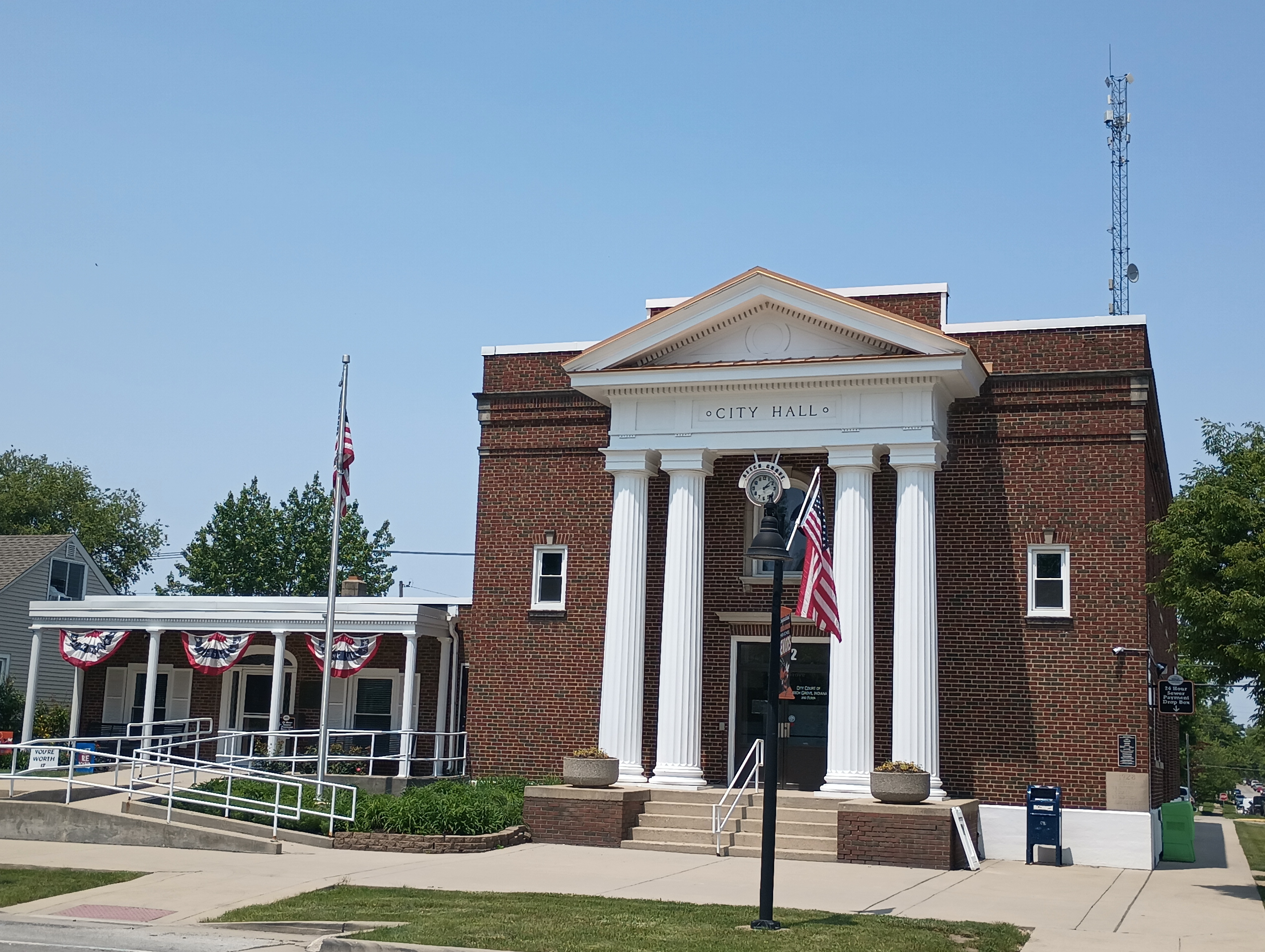
- Beech Grove City Hall in 2023

- Flag Logo
- Motto: "Where Tradition Welcomes Progress"
- Location of Beech Grove in Marion County, Indiana.

- Location in Indiana Beech Grove (the United States) Beech Grove (North America)
- Coordinates: 39°42′56″N 86°05′13″W
- Country: United States
- State: Indiana
- County: Marion
- Townships: Perry, Franklin, Center, Warren
- Founded: 1906

Government
  - Type: Mayor–council
  - Mayor: James W. Coffman (D)
  - City Council: Elizabeth Lamping (D, 1st); Ryan Matkins (R, 2nd); Michael Hemmelgarn (R, 3rd); Brian McKenna(R, 4th); Mike Earnest (D, 5th); Chris Duffer (R, AL); Dan McMillan (D, AL)

Area
  - Total: 4.47 sq mi (11.57 km^{2})
  - Land: 4.47 sq mi (11.57 km^{2})
  - Water: 0 sq mi (0.00 km^{2})
- Elevation: 814 ft (248 m)

Population (2020)
  - Total: 14,717
  - Density: 3,293.1/sq mi (1,271.46/km^{2})
- Time zone: UTC-5 (EST)
  - Summer (DST): UTC-4 (EDT)
- ZIP code: 46107
- Area code: 317
- FIPS code: 18-04204
- GNIS feature ID: 2394106
- Interstate Spurs: I-465
- Public transit: IndyGo
- Website: www.beechgrove.com

Beech Grove is a city in Marion County, Indiana, United States. As of the 2020 census, the city's population is 14,717. The city is located within the Indianapolis metropolitan area. Beech Grove is designated an "excluded city" under Indiana law, as it is not part of the consolidated government of Indianapolis and Marion County.

== History ==
By the turn of the 20th century, the Beech Grove area was a rural section of Marion County. Notable residents included poet and women's-rights activist Sarah Tittle (Barrett) Bolton (1814–1893) and Indianapolis financier Francis McClintock Churchman (1833–1891).

Bolton's farm, "Beech Bank", and Churchman's cattle farm, "Beech Grove Farm", both reflected the abundance of beech trees in this area. This would eventually provide the reason for the city's name, although an early railroad stop in the area was known as "Ingallstown". The city's Sarah T. Bolton Park, situated on some of the former Beech Bank farmland, still contains several large beech trees along its southern boundary.

The actual city came into existence as a company town for a new railroad repair facility, the Beech Grove Shops, constructed by the Cleveland, Cincinnati, Chicago, and St. Louis Railroad (nicknamed the "Big Four"). Through acquisitions and mergers over the years, the railroad shops have been run by the New York Central, Penn Central and, presently, Amtrak rail systems. The complex sits on 108 acres (0.44 km^{2}) with 700,000 square feet (65,000 m^{2}) underroof. In 2007, Amtrak had 550 employees working there. In recognition of the city's heritage as a railroad town, Amtrak's business car 10001 is named The Beech Grove and is often used by agency officials when they travel the system.

Although Beech Grove was incorporated in late 1906, it did not see rapid growth until the completion of the railroad facility in 1908; as of July 1907, for example, there were only four homes and two businesses in place.

Beech Grove grew with several annexations after between 1953 and 1969 totaling hundreds of acres, with the final one (1969) taking place just before the Unigov legislation which merged Indianapolis with most of the rest of Marion County, preventing future annexation.

Two famous actors have listed Beech Grove as their birthplace—Clifton Webb (November 19, 1889–1966) and Steve McQueen (March 24, 1930–1980). Webb was born before Beech Grove came into existence as a separate entity, while McQueen was born at the city's St. Francis Hospital.

On October 15, 1948, Beech Grove received the honor of a visit by a sitting President of the United States. Harry S. Truman, a Mason, came to the city's Masonic Lodge during his "whistle stop" re-election campaign to participate in a ceremony involving a member of his staff who was one of its members.

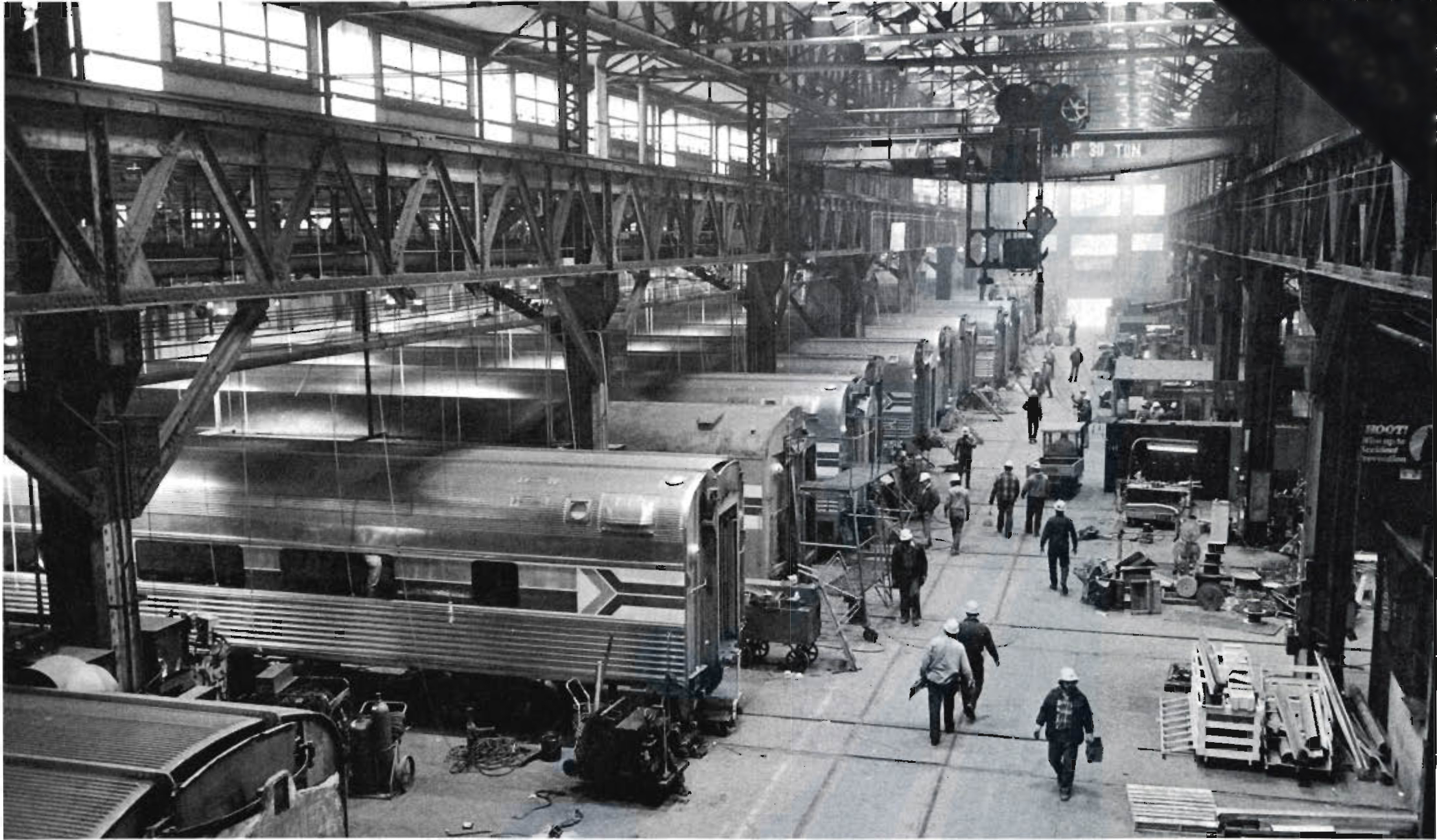
Amtrak trains are serviced at the Beech Grove Shops in 1980.

== Geography ==
According to the United States Census Bureau, the city has a total area of 4.39 square miles (11.37 km^{2}), all land.

The city's elevation, measured in feet above sea level, ranges from 766 (the Beech Creek waterway, where it is crossed by South 9th Avenue) to 845 (the northeastern portion of the Amtrak railroad property). It is higher than that of downtown Indianapolis.

The city contains several small non-navigable waterways. Beech Creek, McFarland Creek, Pullman Creek, and Victory Run all feed into Lick Creek, which (after leaving the city limits) feeds into the West Fork of the White River.

The city is located within parts of four of Marion County's townships. In order of city land size, those townships are Perry, Franklin, Center, and Warren. In order of city population, the list is Perry, Center, and Franklin; the Warren Township section is uninhabited railroad land.

=== Climate ===
The climate in this area is characterized by hot, humid summers and generally mild to cool winters. According to the Köppen Climate Classification system, Beech Grove has a humid subtropical climate, abbreviated "Cfa" on climate maps.

== Demographics ==
Historical population
Census	Pop.	Note	%±
1910	568		—
1920	1,459		156.9%
1930	3,552		143.5%
1940	3,847		8.3%
1950	5,612		45.9%
1960	10,973		95.5%
1970	13,559		23.6%
1980	13,196		−2.7%
1990	13,383		1.4%
2000	14,880		11.2%
2010	14,192		−4.6%
2020	14,717		3.7%
Source: US Census Bureau

=== 2010 census ===
As of the census of 2010, there were 14,192 people, 5,898 households, and 3,567 families residing in the city. The population density was 3,232.8 inhabitants per square mile (1,248.2/km^{2}). There were 6,479 housing units at an average density of 1,475.9 per square mile (569.8/km^{2}). The racial makeup of the city was 91.5% White, 3.2% African American, 0.3% Native American, 0.7% Asian, 2.1% from other races, and 2.1% from two or more races. Hispanic or Latino of any race were 4.2% of the population.

There were 5,898 households, of which 31.7% had children under the age of 18 living with them, 37.3% were married couples living together, 16.9% had a female householder with no husband present, 6.2% had a male householder with no wife present, and 39.5% were non-families. 33.3% of all households were made up of individuals, and 12.8% had someone living alone who was 65 years of age or older. The average household size was 2.36 and the average family size was 2.98.

The median age in the city was 37.7 years. 24.6% of residents were under the age of 18; 9.2% were between the ages of 18 and 24; 25.7% were from 25 to 44; 25.5% were from 45 to 64; and 14.9% were 65 years of age or older. The gender makeup of the city was 46.5% male and 53.5% female.

=== 2000 census ===
As of the census of 2000, there were 14,880 people, 6,085 households, and 3,839 families residing in the city. The population density was 3,462.5 inhabitants per square mile (1,336.9/km^{2}). There were 6,506 housing units at an average density of 1,513.9 per square mile (584.5/km^{2}). The racial makeup of the city was 96.24% White, 0.89% African American, 0.19% Native American, 0.81% Asian, 0.05% Pacific Islander, 0.78% from other races, and 1.04% from two or more races. Hispanic or Latino of any race were 2.07% of the population.

There were 6,085 households, out of which 30.8% had children under the age of 18 living with them, 45.1% were married couples living together, 13.2% had a female householder with no husband present and 36.9% were non-families. 31.5% of all households were made up of individuals, and 12.9% had someone living alone who was 65 years of age or older. The average household size was 2.38 and the average family size was 2.99.

In the city the population was spread out, with 25.2% under the age of 18, 8.9% from 18 to 24, 30.8% from 25 to 44, 19.3% from 45 to 64, and 15.8% who were 65 years of age or older. The median age was 36 years. For every 100 females, there were 88.8 males. For every 100 females age 18 and over, there were 83.4 males.

The median income for a household in the city was $41,548 and the median income for a family was $46,944. Males had a median income of $37,500 versus $26,135 for females. The per capita income for the city was $19,647. About 4.4% of families and 6.1% of the population were below the poverty line, including 3.1% of those under age 18 and 9.5% of those age 65 or over.

== Government ==
Although geographically completely surrounded by Indianapolis, Beech Grove is an excluded city so it maintains its own police, public works, and parks departments and operates its own senior-citizens' center. However, in July 2021, the city council began consideration of an interlocal agreement under which the Indianapolis Fire Department (IFD) would provide fire protection services for the next 20 years. Current Beech Grove firefighters would become members of IFD. The ambulance service would continue to be operated by the city.

The Beech Grove Police Department has suffered four deaths in its history. The most recent of these deaths was Officer Brian Elliott.

Fallen officers of the Beech Grove Police Department
Name	Rank	Date of death	End of watch
Richard D. Ferguson	Deputy Chief	December 22, 1972	Heart attack/Automobile crash
Thomas L. Kleis	Lieutenant	May 28, 1991	Automobile crash (High-speed chase)
William R. Toney	Officer	September 29, 2000	Gunfire (Foot pursuit)
Brian Elliott	Officer	February 16, 2026	Gunfire (Domestic disturbance call)

Beech Grove's government was first organized as a "Town Board" system on November 12, 1906. The system remained until 1935, consisting of three elected ward representatives and a clerk-treasurer. From 1911 to 1939, board members were elected as representatives of locally organized political parties (e.g., Progressive, Citizens's Ticket, Peoples's Ticket).

Upon legally becoming an Indiana fifth-class city in 1935, its first mayor and four city council members were elected (three district members, and one at-large). Beech Grove achieved Indiana fourth-class city status in 1961. The present city council consists of five district members and two at-large members, plus an elected clerk-treasurer.

The mayors, their political affiliations, and their terms of office, have been:

- Charles Adams (Progressive, 1935–1938); (Democratic, 1939–1942)
- E. Allen Hunter (Republican, 1943–1948 and 1952–1955)
- Richard H. Byland (Democratic, 1948–1951)
- David D. Finney (Democratic, 1956–1958)
- Elton H. Geshwiler (Democratic, 1959–1991)
- J. Warner Wiley (Democratic, 1991–2003)
- Donald "Joe" Wright (Republican, 2004–2011)
- John Jennings (Republican, interim, 2011)
- Terry Dilk (Republican, 2011)
- Dennis Buckley (Democratic, 2012–2023)
- James W. Coffman (Democratic, 2024–present)

Mayor Joe Wright announced his resignation from the office as of January 14, 2011; city councilman John Jennings was named as interim mayor, until the appointment of Terry Dilk on January 25, 2011, by the Marion County Republican Committee to fill out Wright's term through the 2011 elections. Dilk was defeated in the November 8, 2011, election by former City fire chief Dennis Buckley, who became the first mayor to have been the child of a former candidate for the same office (his father, Robert Buckley, was defeated in the 1967 election).

The 1951 mayoral election featured Democrat Alice Stratton, one of Indiana's first female candidates for such an office.

The city flag was not adopted until the 1970s, when a competition was held in which citizens were invited to submit designs. The winning designer was Mike Hart. The flag features an orange, black and white logo on a blue field; the logo shows the profile of an old-style railroad locomotive, in orange, with a white circle superimposed in the center. The circle contains a depiction of the tower complex of St. Francis Hospital, and bears the name of the city, the year "1906" and the motto "Where Tradition Welcomes Progress".

== Education ==
The city has its own school district, the Beech Grove City Schools, but Franklin Township Community School Corporation also serves some of this region. Beech Grove City Schools consists of five facilities (Hornet Park, Central Elementary, South Grove Intermediate, Beech Grove Middle, and Beech Grove High). Its high school athletic teams, the "Hornets" (colors: orange and black) participate as members of the statewide Indiana High School Athletic Association (IHSAA), the Marion County Athletic Association, and the Indiana Crossroads Conference.

The city's first school was opened in 1907 in the upstairs of the Wheat Grocery Store at 423 Main Street. Between 1909 and 1929, a series of school buildings and additions were constructed in the 1000 block of Main; only the original gymnasium remains from these structures. The high school was begun in 1917 and its first graduating class was in 1922.

A new combined junior high/high school was built in 1955 at 1248 Buffalo Street, just northwest of the existing school site. The previous complex became Central Elementary. The new facility operated on a split-day schedule, with high school students attending in the morning and junior high students attending in the afternoon.

By 1960, the city's growth to the south prompted the building of South Grove Elementary (later Intermediate) at the 800 block of South 9th Avenue. With the population growth, the present high school was built in 1966 just east of the 4000 block of South Emerson Avenue and the 1955 facility remained as the junior high (later middle) school.

Before the 1990s, the kindergarten education experience was only offered in the city by private specialty schools (past examples being Cassidy's and Happy Time). As part of the state's trend to incorporate this age level within the public schools, the city school system joined with the city's Parks Department in the development of Hornet Park, a dual-use facility built on the grounds of the former Olympia Club (a private swimming/recreation club). Kindergarten (and, added recently, 1st grade) classes are held in the south part, while the city offers meeting rooms and exercise facilities in the north part.

Within the traditional focus in Indiana on high-school basketball, the Beech Grove Hornets have earned two Indiana High School Athletic Association (IHSAA) State Championships. Its girls team won first, in Class 3A of the 2003 tournament. From that team, senior Katie Gearlds won both the IHSAA's Patricia Roy Mental Attitude Award (for Class 3A) and the "Miss Basketball" honor for the entire State. She went on to the WNBA's Seattle Storm in the 2007 season. Its boys team won its only State Championship, also in Class 3A, of the 2022 tournament. During the non-class years before 1996, the school had earned only three Sectional (equivalent to District in some states) titles (two by the boys' team in 1966 and 1992, and one by the girls' team in 1978); since the change to classes in Indiana high-school basketball, the boys' team has won one Class 3A Sectional title (2008).

Beech Grove High School's "Marching Hornets" band program has earned four Indiana State School Music Association (ISSMA) State Band Finals berths in its history and earned their first ISSMA Regional Gold rating in nine years in 2005. The Marching Hornets continue to achieve great levels of success on the marching music field. After 2005, the band has returned to the level of success that they had during the James Williams years. They have grown to become one of ISSMAs Class C "powerhouses" in the South. In 2009, 2010 and 2011, the Marching Hornets returned to the state finals for the first time in 19 years, where they placed 5th in Class C on 2009, 7th in Class C in 2010, and 2nd in Class C in 2011. They would continue to reach state finals in Class C in 2012, 2013, 2015, and 2016. During the 2017 season, Beech Grove High School's growing enrollment reclassified the Marching Hornets as a Class B program. The Marching Hornets would take 5th place in 2017— their inaugural season in Class B.

Also within the city limits are the Holy Name of Jesus School (Roman Catholic, grades pre-school to 8), built in 1922. Many students from Holy Name of Jesus continue their high school studies at Beech Grove High School or the nearby Roncalli High School.

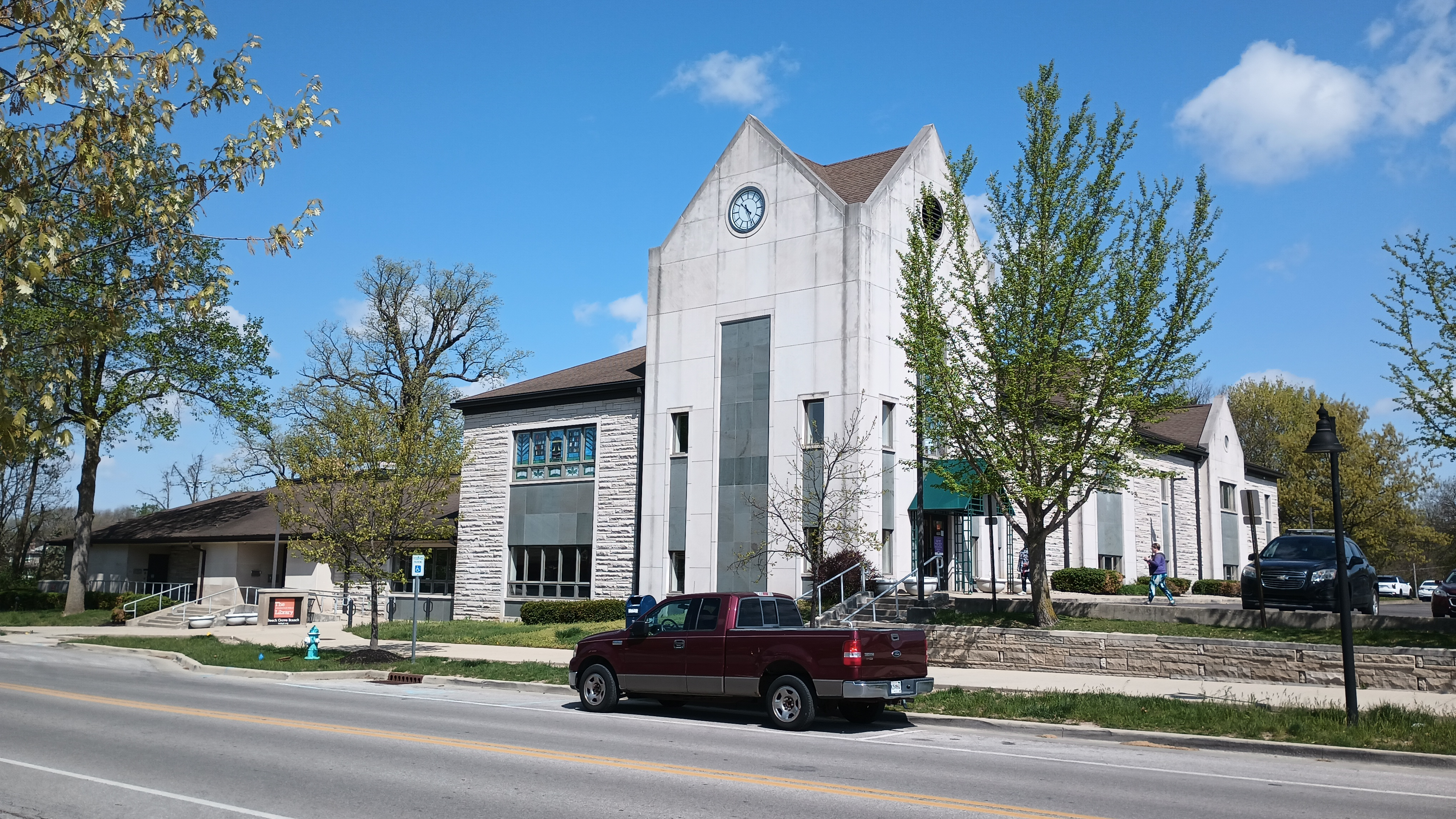
Beech Grove branch of the Indianapolis Public Library in 2023

Beech Grove has a public library, a branch of the Indianapolis Public Library. For many years the city maintained its own library, but in April 2016, the boards of the Indianapolis and the Beech Grove public libraries voted to merge, with the Beech Grove library becoming the 23rd branch library of the Indianapolis library system on June 1, 2016.

== Medical institutions ==
Franciscan Health Indianapolis, formerly known as St. Francis Hospital, was founded in Beech Grove by the monastic order of the Sisters of St. Francis of Perpetual Adoration in 1914. The Beech Grove hospital closed in 2012 after most medical services were transferred to a more modern, suburban hospital campus in south Indianapolis.

== Religious institutions ==
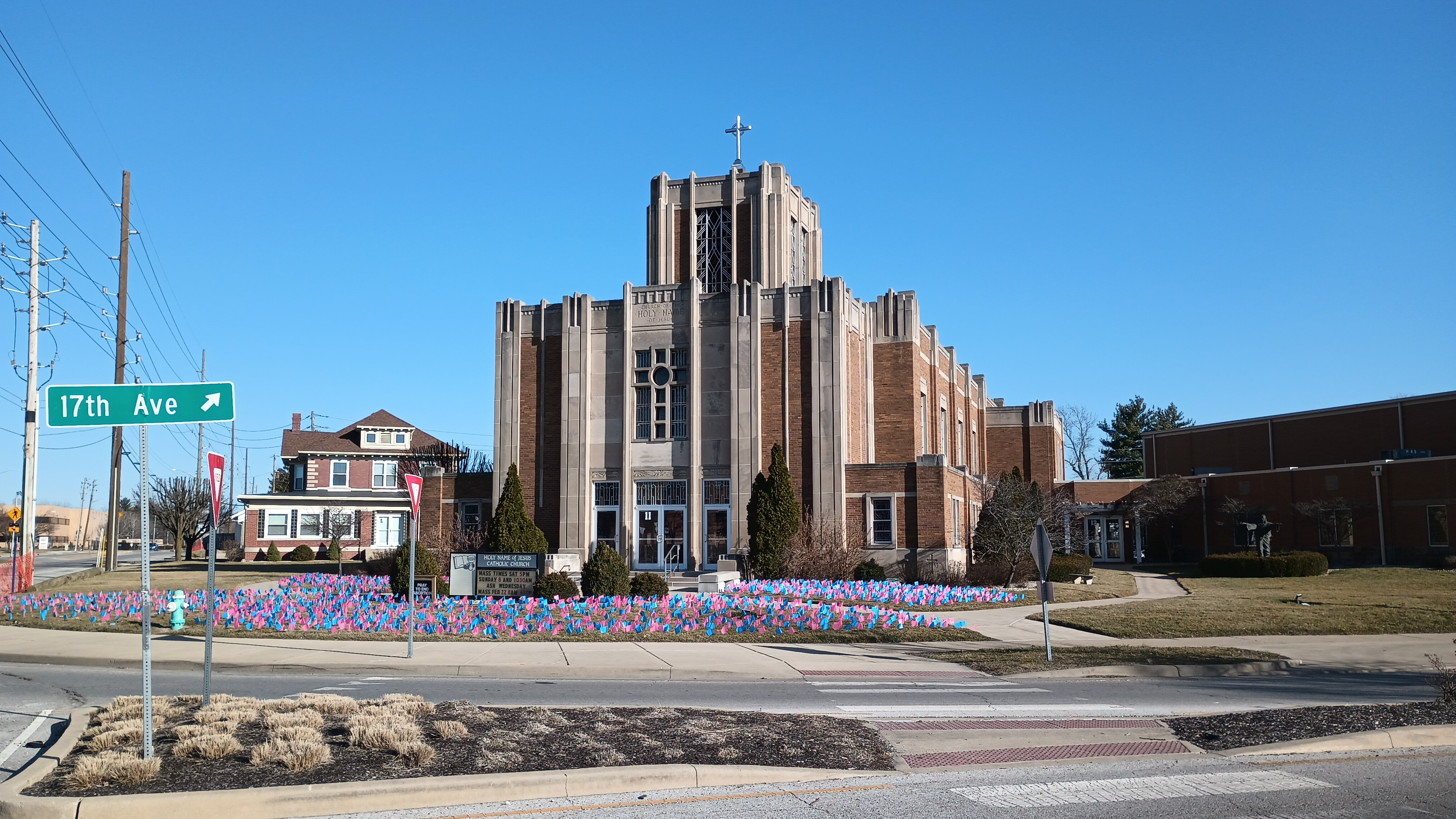
Exterior of Holy Name of Jesus Catholic Church in 2023

Beech Grove's oldest churches have existed since the earliest days of the city. Father Peter J. Killian established the Blessed Sacrament Parish (Roman Catholic Church) in the upstairs of his home in 1908; its present name of Holy Name of Jesus Parish was taken in 1918. A Methodist Episcopal meeting in the Clapp family home in 1908 eventually led to the present Beech Grove United Methodist Church. A noon-time Christian men's meeting of "Big Four" railroad employees in 1910 was the genesis of the present Beech Grove Christian Church. In late 1912, the First Baptist Church (since 1937, General Association of Regular Baptist Churches) was organized and is now in its second location within the city.

Churches established in the city in later years include Beech Grove Wesleyan Church (formerly Pilgrim Holiness Church, in the 1920s); Faith Assembly of God (Assemblies of God, 1958); South Emerson Church of God (Reformation Movement, Church of God (Anderson), 1961); Southwood Baptist Church (Southern Baptist Convention, 1962); and Ascension Lutheran Church (Lutheran Church–Missouri Synod, 1972). In recent years, independent community churches have appeared (e.g., Body of Christ Fellowship, Church on The Word, Omega Harvest).

The Benedict Inn is a multi-use facility operated by the local Our Lady of Grace Monastery of the Sisters of the Order of St. Benedict. It contains meeting rooms, a gymnasium, and an indoor pool, which were part of the former Our Lady of Grace all-girls Catholic high school.

== Civic institutions ==
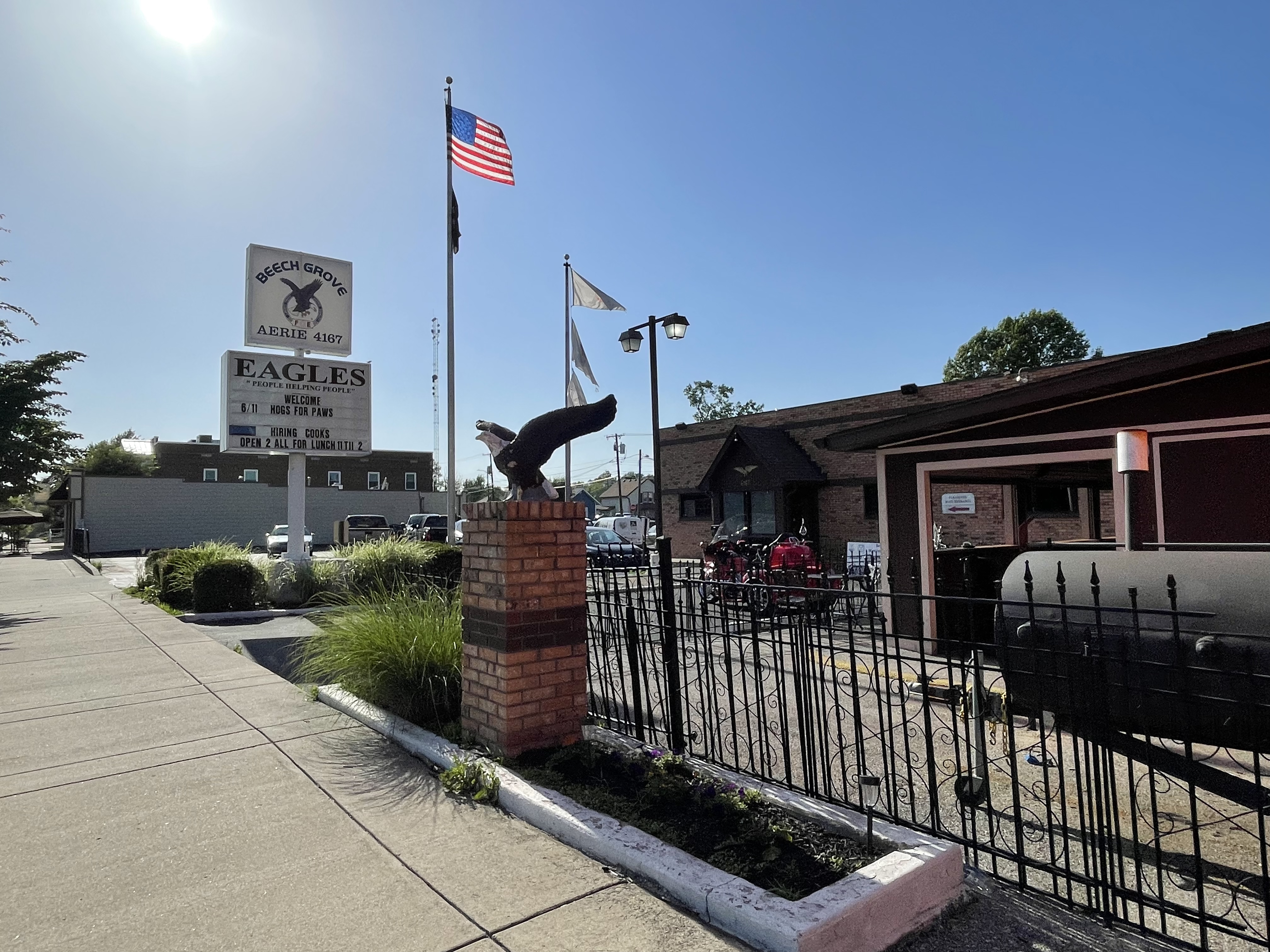
The Beech Grove chapter of the Fraternal Order of Eagles in 2022.

Established service groups include chapters of the Lions International and Kiwanis. The local Beech Grove Promoters Club was founded in 1953 as a chapter of the National Exchange Club, but left that organization in 1957 and adopted its present name. It organizes the city's two main public festivals—the 3rd of July Fireworks and the Fall Festival (since 1959) in September.

The city also contains Lodges of the Free and Accepted Masons, Fraternal Order of Eagles and Loyal Order of Moose. Posts of the American Legion and the Veterans of Foreign Wars are also active.

Past civic organizations which, while no longer in existence, performed service to the city include the Beech Grove Civic League and the Beech Grove Jaycees. The Jaycees organized a "Buck-A-Brick" campaign in the 1950s to build a house-sized Beech Grove Civic Center on South 3rd Avenue, offering meeting rooms to the citizens. (This facility is now the home of the Body of Christ Fellowship.)

== Transportation ==
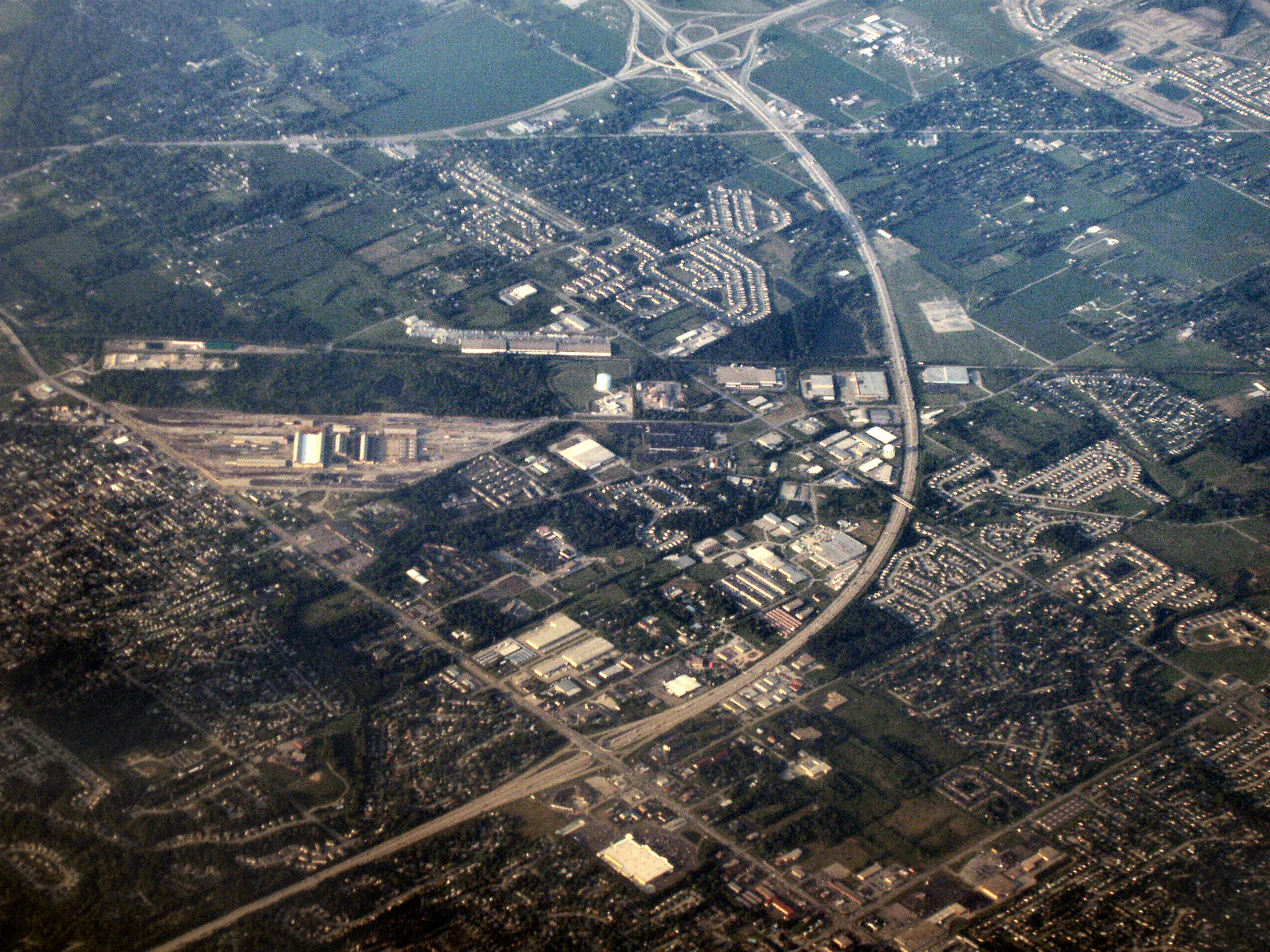
Aerial of southeastern Beech Grove in 2005. Visible transportation landmarks include the Amtrak repair yards (left center), Interstate 465 (bending from bottom left), and its interchange with Interstate 74 (top center).

The city has direct access to the Interstate Highway System as it straddles exit 52 of Interstate 465. It is served by local public bus routes of Indianapolis' IndyGo system. Routes 12-Minnesota and 13-Raymond serve 17th Avenue (Sherman Drive) from Southern Avenue to Main Street, with select trips serving Albany Street from 17th Avenue to 25th Avenue. Route 14-Prospect serves Emerson Avenue from the Amtrak railroad crossing all the way to Thompson Road, the southern end of Beech Grove. Route 16-Beech Grove serves Albany Street from 25th Avenue to 17th Avenue, 17th from Albany to Main, Main from 17th to Emerson Avenue, and Emerson to Thompson Road. Routes 12, 13, and 14 run seven days a week, while Route 16 runs only Monday through Saturday. There is currently no light rail or streetcar service, although one existed in the past.

Beech Grove maintains an address-numbering system distinct from surrounding Indianapolis. Addresses are numbered as either east/west or north–south from the intersection of Main Street and First Avenue.

The city's street grid reflects two distinct urban planning styles. The original roadway connecting Beech Grove to Indianapolis was Churchman Avenue, running northwest from Beech Grove. The original city was built to the north of Churchman Avenue, on a north–south grid pattern with alleys, centered on the widened roads of Main Street and Fifth Avenue. While a parkway was planned for both sides of Lick Creek, only a small segment of it was actually established.

With the post-World War II "Baby Boom" population growth, new streets were built south of Churchman Avenue in the modern style of sweeping curves and cul-de-sacs.

Certain streets change names at the Beech Grove city limits. Indianapolis' Troy Avenue becomes Beech Grove's Albany Street; Indianapolis' Sherman Drive becomes Beech Grove's 17th Avenue; and Indianapolis' Emerson Avenue becomes (in places) Beech Grove's 1st Avenue.

== Local media ==
Beech Grove has no daily newspaper, but its news events were mainly covered for many years by a free weekly newspaper headquartered within the city. Titled The Southside Times, the weekly was for most of its existence known as the Perry Township Weekly. The Southside Times left its longtime Main Street home in November 2012 in favor of a house on US 31 South, while the space was filled by Shupe's Lawn Care company. Past Beech Grove newspapers included the Independent, the Graphic, the Spotlight and The Indiana Commons. The city has no local radio or television station. It is part of the Indianapolis radio/television market and has its own cable TV Government-access television channel available on the Comcast system.

== Youth activities ==
Among the organizations sponsoring youth athletics are the Beech Grove Little League, the Beech Grove Athletic Boosters (football, volleyball, basketball), the Beech Grove Wrestling Club, the Beech Grove Girls Softball Association, the Beech Grove Soccer Club and the Beech Grove Swimming Club. Teams representing Holy Name of Jesus School participate in Indianapolis' Catholic Youth Organization sports league, in sports such as football, wrestling, kickball, and basketball.

The Scouting movement, both the Boy Scouts of America and the Girl Scouts of the USA, have had a long history within Beech Grove. For many years, Boy Scout Troop 79 was the city's main unit; present troops are 108. Various Girl Scout and Brownie Troops have existed. Beech Grove, although not a rural community, also has an active chapter of the traditionally-rural 4-H Club.

== In popular culture ==
The Beech Grove Police Department was one of the initial departments featured on the reality television and docuseries On Patrol: Live from its launch in 2022 until March 2023. After a hiatus, the department returned to the show in August 2024. A live segment featured on the show in January 2023 brought Beech Grove international media attention following an incident where a toddler was caught on a doorbell camera waving a loaded gun while unattended.

Beech Grove was featured in the 2024 Netflix documentary Will & Harper. Filming occurred in March 2023.

== See also ==
- List of cities surrounded by another city
- List of neighborhoods in Indianapolis
