= Downtown Indianapolis =

Central business district in Indianapolis, Indiana, US

- Neighborhood area
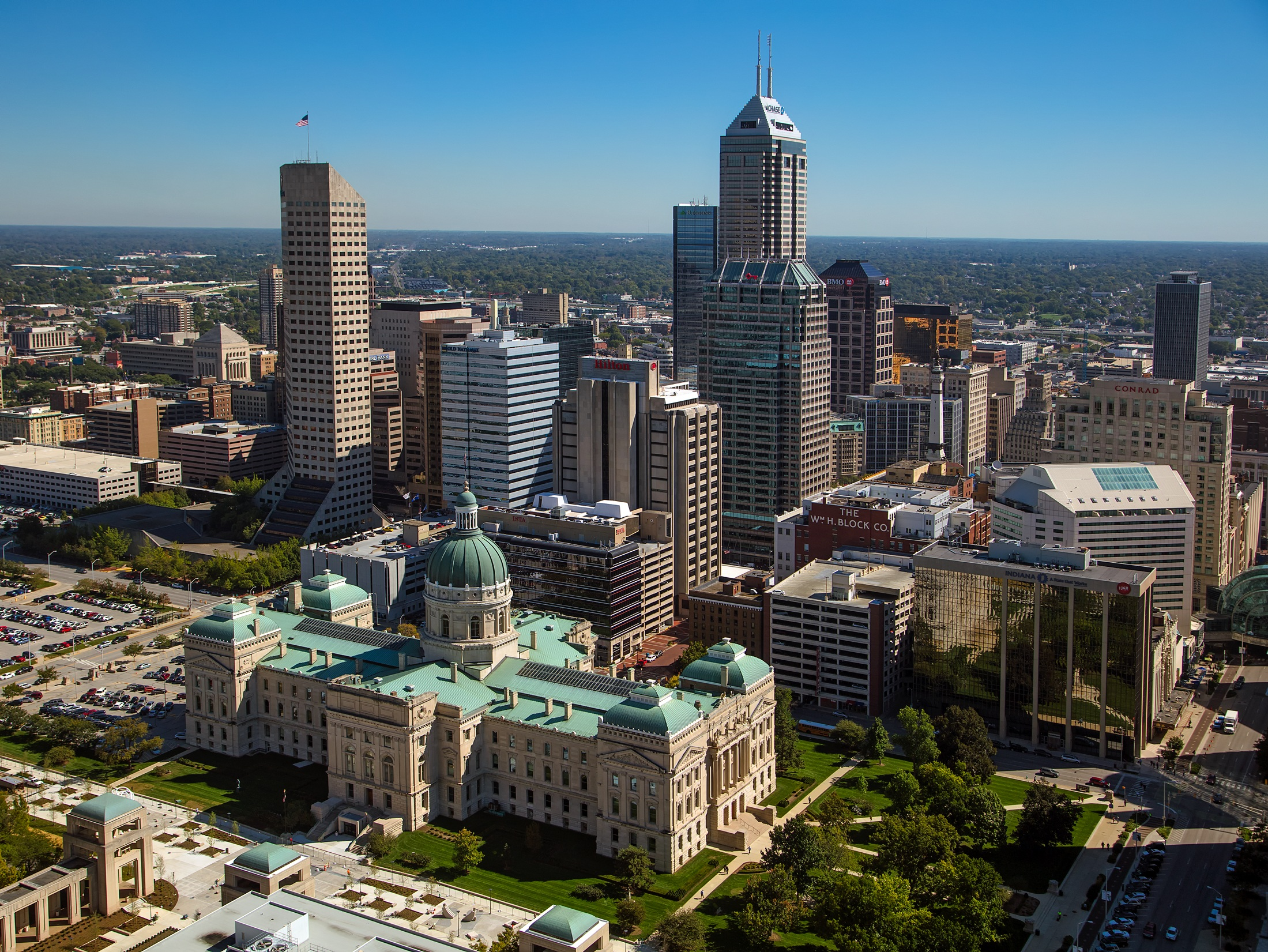
- Downtown Indianapolis looking northeast, 2016
- Nickname: "Downtown Indy"
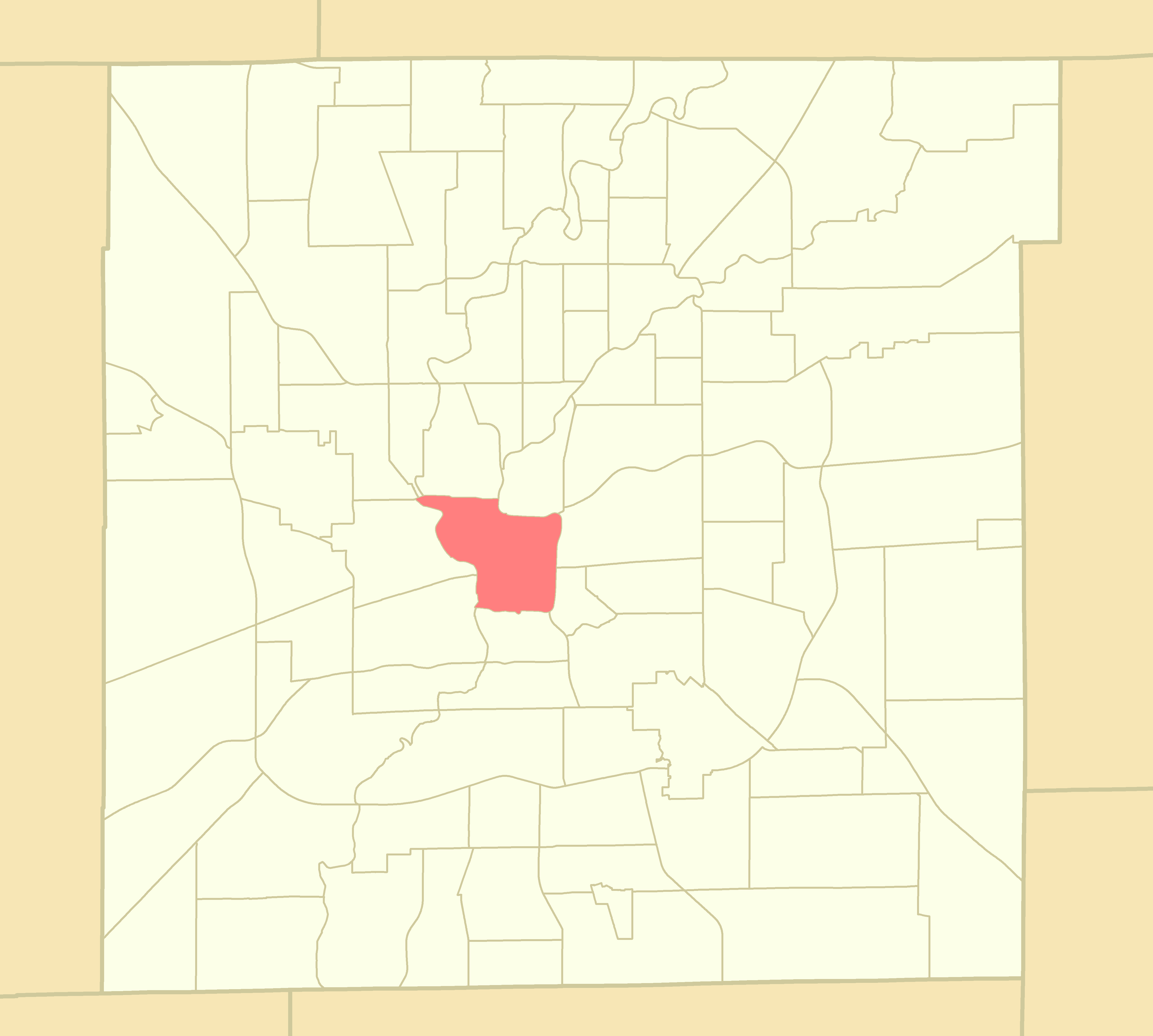
- Location of Downtown within Indianapolis–Marion County, Indiana
- Coordinates: 39.77°N 86.16°W
- Country: United States
- State: Indiana
- County: Marion
- Township: Center
- City: Indianapolis

Population (2020)
  - Total: 22,412
- Time zone: UTC−5 (EST)
  - Summer (DST): UTC−4 (EDT)
- ZIP code: 46202, 46203, 46204, 46225
- Area code: 317 / 463
- Website: www.downtownindy.org

Downtown Indianapolis is a neighborhood area in and the central business district of Indianapolis, Indiana, United States. Downtown is bordered by Interstate 65, Interstate 70, and the White River, and is situated near the geographic center of Marion County. Downtown emerged from the original 1821 town plat for Indianapolis—often referred to as the Mile Square—to encompass a broader geographic area of the central city, containing several smaller historic neighborhoods.

Downtown Indianapolis is the cultural, economic, and political center of the Indianapolis metropolitan area. Downtown anchors the city's burgeoning leisure and hospitality sector, home to nearly 8,000 hotel rooms and the city's major sports and convention facilities. Most of the city's monuments and memorials, performing arts venues, and museums are located downtown, as well as numerous parks, historic sites, and districts. Since 1825, the respective seats of municipal and state governments have operated from downtown Indianapolis.

== Location and boundaries ==
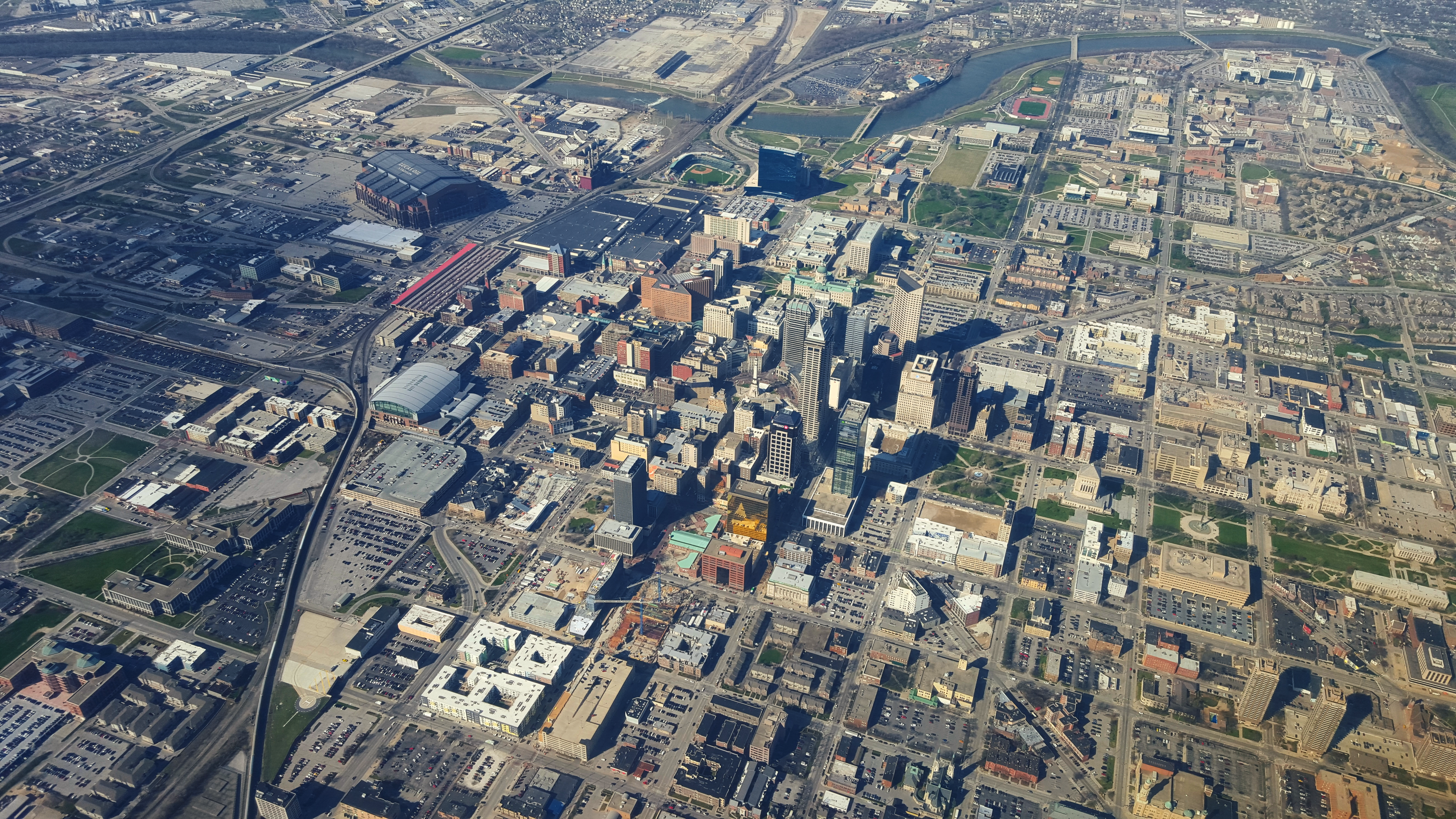
Aerial centered on downtown Indianapolis's Mile Square (2016)

When Indianapolis was founded in 1820, the new capital city was planned to occupy an area of one square mile (2.6 km^{2}) near the confluence of Fall Creek and the White River, close to the geographic center of Marion County. The plat included eastern and western "anchors": the Indiana Statehouse (west), and the Indianapolis City Market and Marion County Courthouse (site of today's City-County Building), respectively. As the population increased and the city matured, the original plat continued to densify, developing into the region's central business district.

The city's historical core and contemporary central business district is sometimes referred to as the Mile Square. However, the downtown Indianapolis "neighborhood area" defines a broader geography of about 7 square miles (18 km^{2}), incorporating the area bounded by 16th Street and Interstate 65 (north), Interstate 70 (south), Interstate 65/70 (east), and the White River (west). Downtown is generally bisected into four quadrants, divided by Meridian Street (north to south) and Washington Street (east to west).

Pogue's Run, a small creek, was channeled into a tunnel beneath downtown in the 1910s. It enters a culvert near New York and Dickson streets east of downtown, emptying into the White River near Kentucky and McCarty streets on downtown's southwest side.

=== Neighborhoods and districts ===
Downtown Indianapolis contains 34 extant apartment buildings that are listed on the National Register of Historic Places in the Apartments and Flats of Downtown Indianapolis Thematic Resources.

Officially designated cultural districts are identified with a "†" symbol:

- Bottleworks District
- Canal and White River State Park†
- Chatham–Arch
- Cole-Noble District
- Flanner House Homes
- Fletcher Place†
- Holy Rosary–Danish Church Historic District
- Indiana Avenue†
- Indiana World War Memorial Historic District
- Lockefield Gardens
- Lockerbie Square Historic District
- Market East†
- Mass Ave Cultural Arts District†
- Old Southside
- Ransom Place Historic District
- St. Joseph Neighborhood Historic District
- Washington Street–Monument Circle Historic District
- Wholesale District†

== History ==
=== 19th century ===
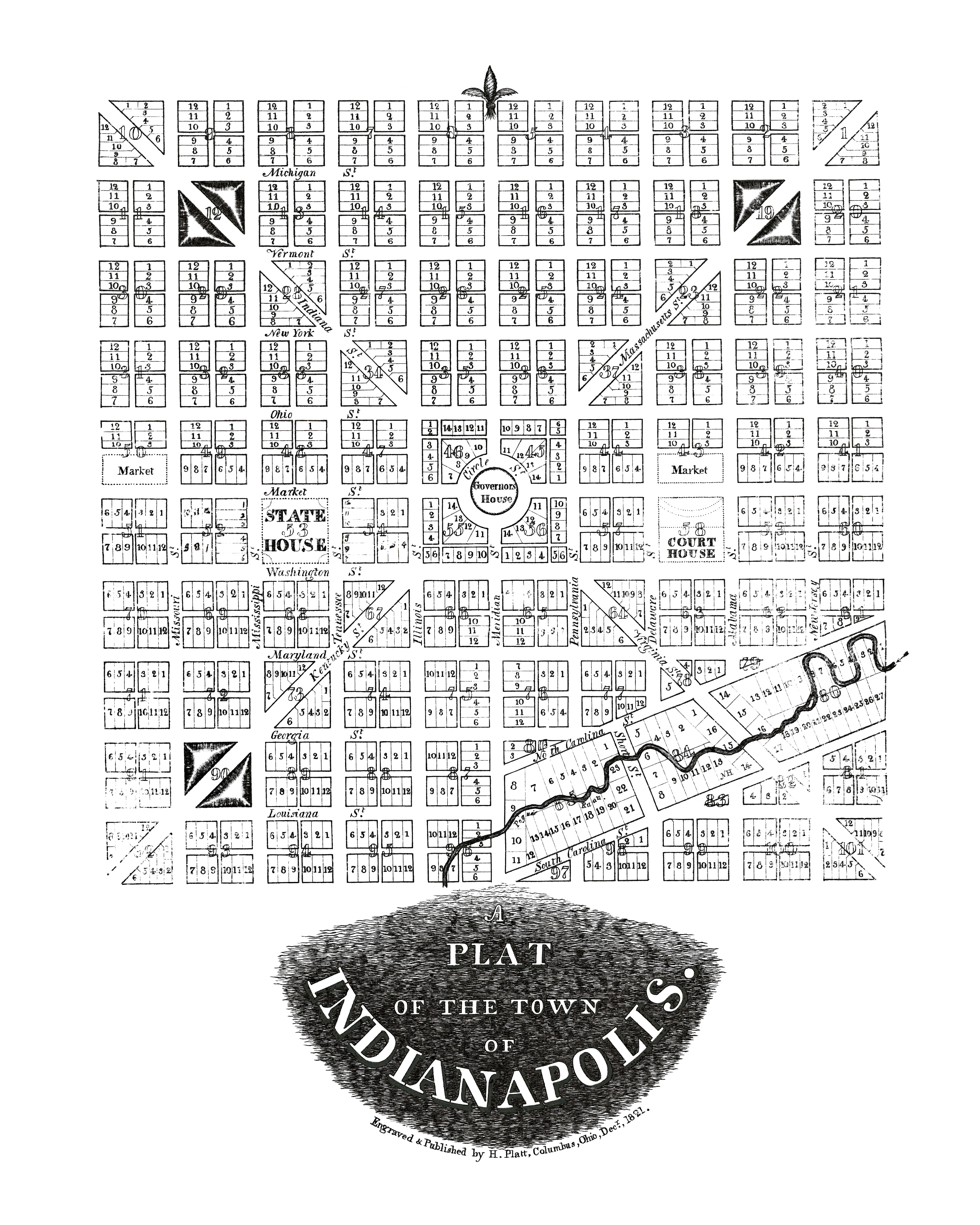
Alexander Ralston's "Plat of the Town of Indianapolis" is referred to as the "Mile Square"

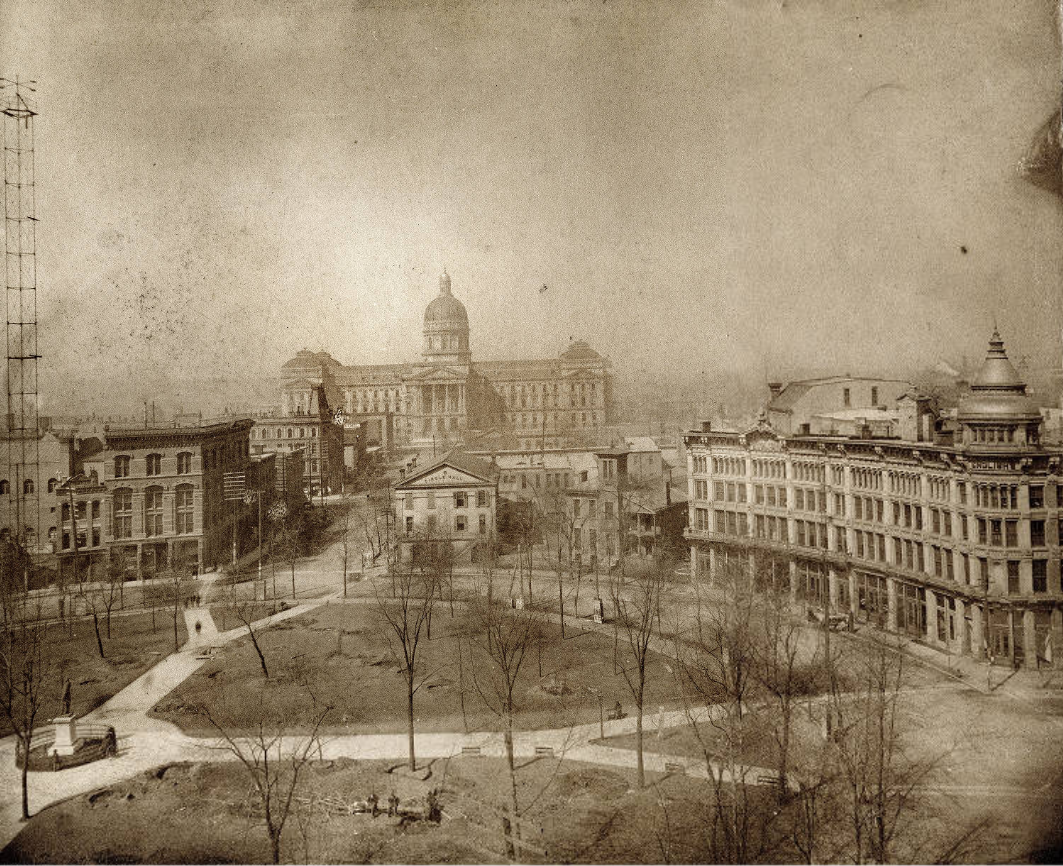
Circle Park, prior to construction of the Soldiers' & Sailors' Monument, looking west toward the Indiana Statehouse, ca. 1882

Downtown Indianapolis dates to the city's founding as the state of Indiana's new capital in 1820 near the east bank of the White River. The state legislature appointed Alexander Ralston and Elias Pym Fordham to survey and design a town plan for Indianapolis, which was platted in 1821. Ralston's original plan for Indianapolis called for a town of one square mile (2.6 km^{2}) bounded by North, East, South, and West streets (although they were not named at that time), with Governor's Circle, a large circular commons, at the center of town.

Ralston's grid pattern with wide roads and public squares extended outward from the four blocks adjacent to the Circle, and also included four diagonal streets, later renamed as avenues. Public squares were reserved for government and community use, but not all of these squares were used for this intended purpose. Ralston altered the grid pattern in the southeast quadrant to accommodate the flow of Pogue's Run, but a plat created in 1831 changed his original design and established a standard grid there as well.

Ralston's basic street plan is still evident in present-day Downtown Indianapolis. Streets in the original plat were named after states that were part of the United States when Indianapolis was initially planned, with the addition of Michigan, which was a U.S. territory at that time. Tennessee and Mississippi Streets were renamed Capitol and Senate Avenues in 1895 after several state government buildings were built west of the Circle near the Indiana Statehouse. There are a few other exceptions to the early street names. The National Road, which eventually bisected Indiana, passed through Indianapolis along Washington Street, a 120-foot-wide (37 m) east–west street, more recently converted into a one-way westbound street west of New Jersey Street, located one block south of the Circle. The city's address numbering system begins at the intersection of Washington and Meridian streets. Meridian and Market Streets intersect the Circle. Few street improvements were made in the 1820s and 1830s; sidewalks did not appear until 1839 or 1840.

In the last half of the 19th century, when the city's population soared from 8,091 in 1850 to 169,164 in 1900, urban development expanded in all directions as Indianapolis experienced a building boom and transitioned from an agricultural community to an industrial center. Some of the city's most iconic structures were built during this period, including several that have survived to the present day in Downtown: the Soldiers' and Sailors' Monument (1888, dedicated 1902), the Indiana Statehouse (1888), Union Station (1888), and the Das Deutsche Haus (1898), among others.

=== 20th century ===
Following World War II, expansion of the American middle class, suburbanization, and declining manufacturing employment greatly impacted Downtown Indianapolis, similar to most U.S. central business districts at this time. Urban renewal projects of this era hastened the central business district's decline, particularly the clearance of working-class neighborhoods. The neighborhoods surrounding Indiana Avenue, the center of the city's African American community, were particularly impacted. The establishment of the Indiana University–Purdue University Indianapolis (IUPUI) campus in 1969 and the construction of Interstate 65 and Interstate 70 in the 1960s and 1970s resulted in large-scale displacement of African Americans.

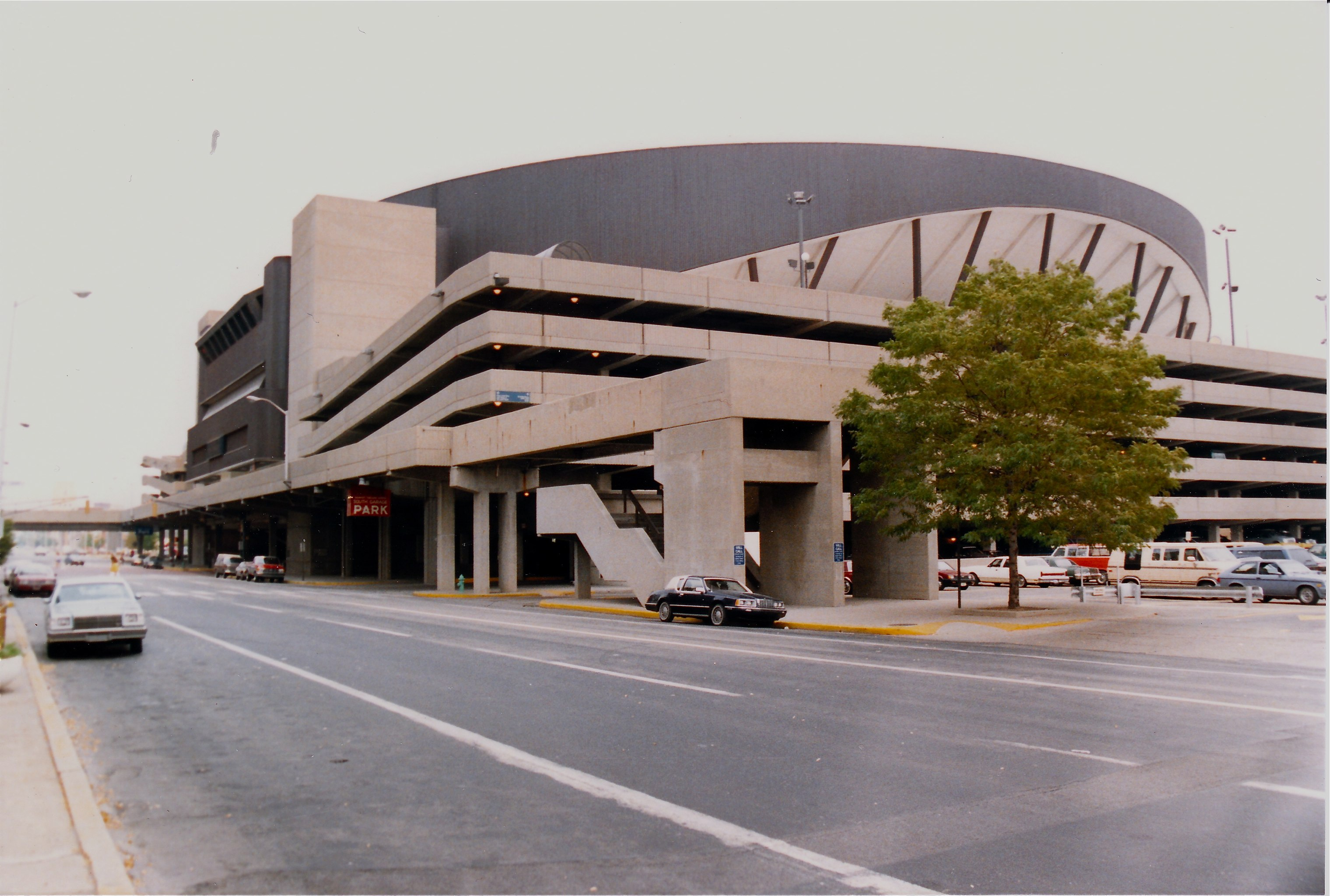
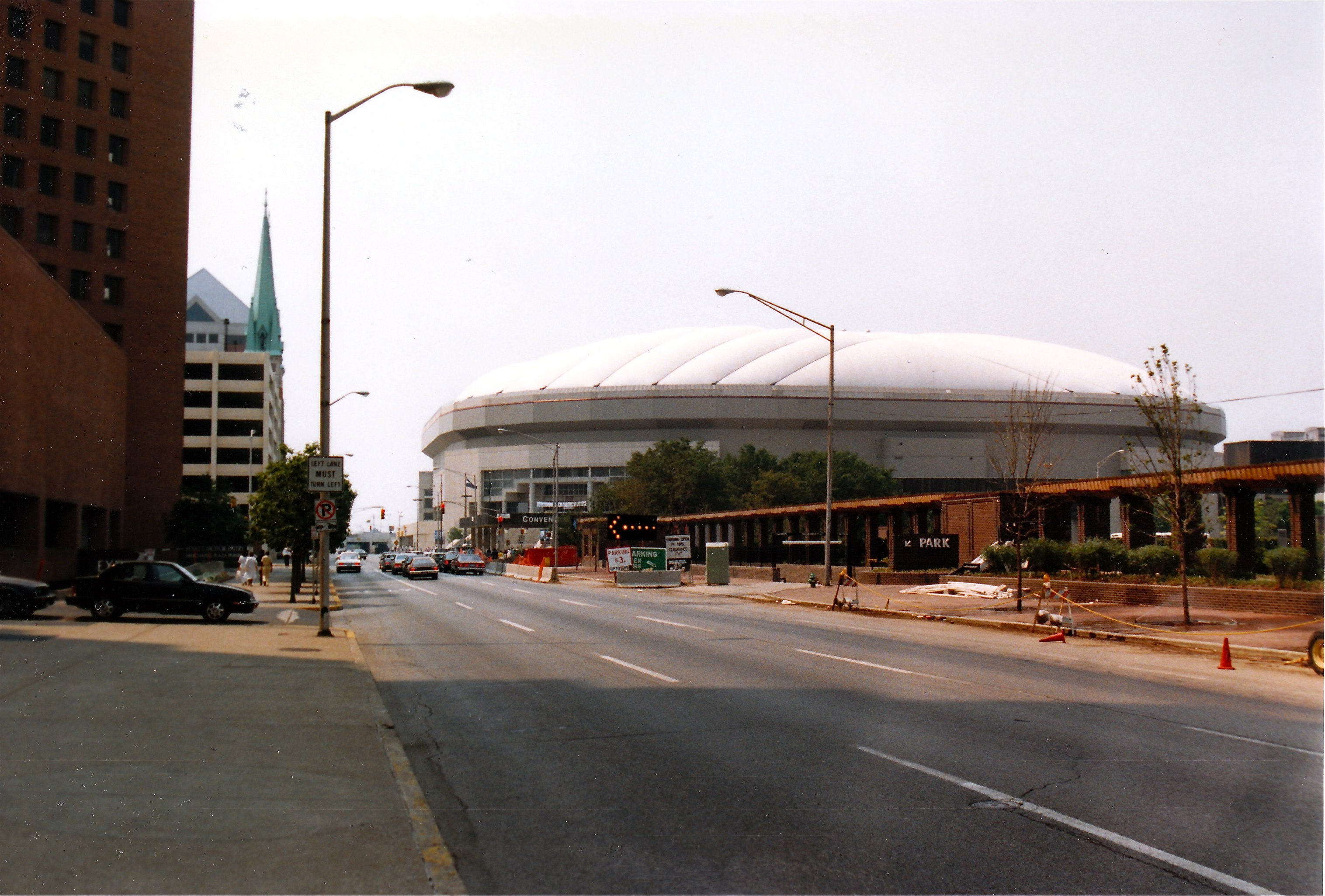
Market Square Arena (left) was the result of one of the first downtown revitalization projects, completed in 1974. The Hoosier Dome (right) opened in 1984.

The loss of population and activity Downtown prompted civic leaders to plan for economic development and revitalization of the area. Among the first projects was the opening of Market Square Arena, which served as home to the Indiana Pacers and host to numerous concerts and other sporting events. The success of Market Square Arena helped persuade decision-makers to make Downtown the center of an aggressive sports tourism strategy. Throughout the 1980s, $122 million in public and private funding built several athletic facilities Downtown, including the Indianapolis Tennis Center, Indiana University Natatorium, Carroll Track and Soccer Stadium, and the Hoosier Dome. The latter project helped secure the 1984 relocation of the Baltimore Colts, the 1987 Pan American Games, and scores of subsequent athletic events of national and international interest.

Modern skyscraper construction catapulted Downtown office and commercial space in the 1980s. A building boom, lasting from 1982 to 1990, saw the construction of six of the city's ten tallest buildings. These included OneAmerica Tower (1982), Fifth Third Bank Tower (1983), Capital Center South Tower (1987), BMO Plaza (1988), Market Tower (1988), 300 North Meridian (1989), and the tallest, Salesforce Tower (1990).

The non-profit Downtown Indy, Inc. was established in 1993 to help promote economic development, beautification, and program events. Reinvestment continued through the 1990s, with the continued buildout of White River State Park museums and attractions, development of the Canal Walk, Circle Centre Mall (1995), Victory Field (1996), and Gainbridge Fieldhouse (1999).

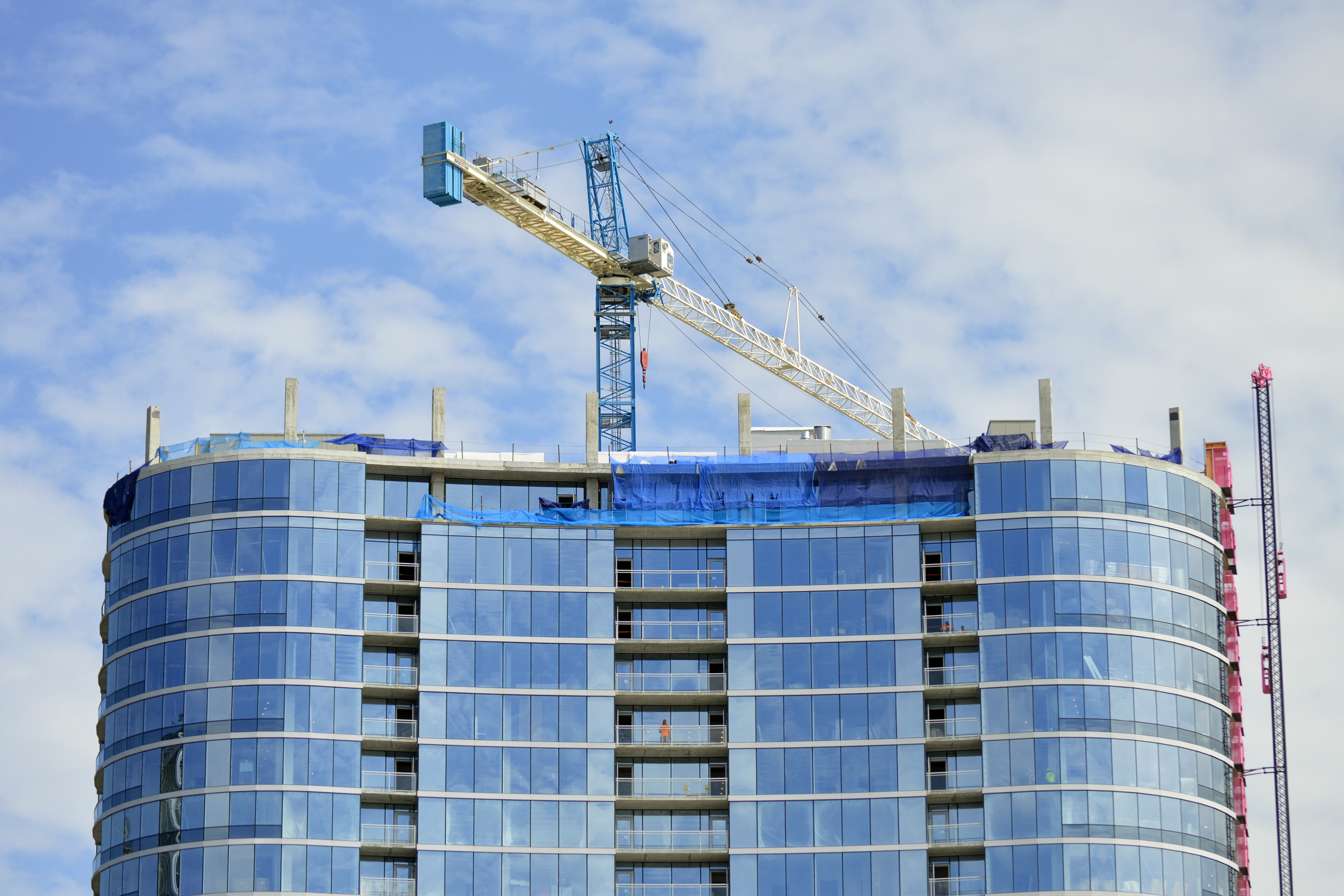
360 Market Square, completed amid the 2010s apartment boom

=== 21st century ===
The city's successful sports tourism campaign provided local leadership with a template for increasing Downtown's capacity to host conventions and trade shows. Two of the city's tallest buildings to be completed in the 21st century, Conrad Indianapolis (2006) and the JW Marriott Indianapolis (2011), are hotels. Following the opening of Lucas Oil Stadium in 2008, the Indiana Convention Center completed its largest expansion in 2011.

In the 2010s, Downtown experienced increased demand for housing. Numerous mixed-use and apartment buildings were developed during this time. According to Downtown Indy, Inc., the number of apartment units Downtown increased 61 percent from 2011 to 2015, with more than 50 percent of new development occurring inside the Mile Square. In 2010, the population of Downtown was 14,664; by 2020, the population had increased to 22,412.

== Economy ==
Downtown is the densest employment cluster in the state of Indiana. According to Downtown Indy, Inc., in 2021, there were about 154,500 workers. (Note: Stats and figures are available by accessing Downtown Indy, Inc.'s 2021 Community Report.) According to Colliers International, the central business district commercial office market contained 11.8 million square feet (1,100,000 m^{2}) of office space, with a direct vacancy rate of 16.9 percent in 2017.

Downtown Indianapolis is home to two of the city's three Fortune 500 companies: health insurance company Elevance Health and pharmaceutical company Lilly. Other prominent downtown employers include AES Indiana, Cummins, Rolls-Royce, Indiana University, IU Health, Angi, Barnes & Thornburg, Emmis Corporation, the Indianapolis Star, OneAmerica Financial Partners, the National Collegiate Athletic Association, Simon Property Group, and Salesforce.

=== Government ===
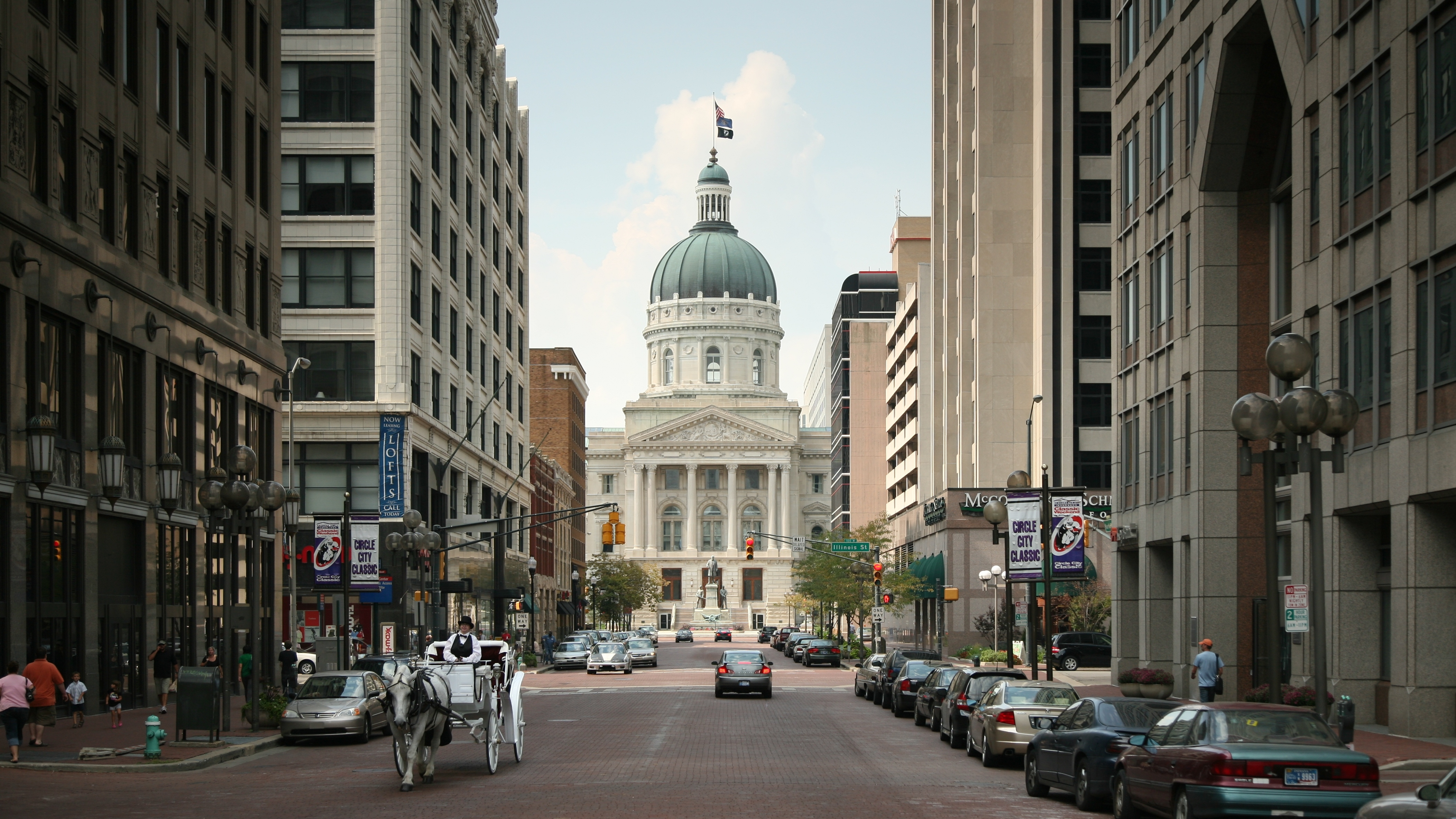
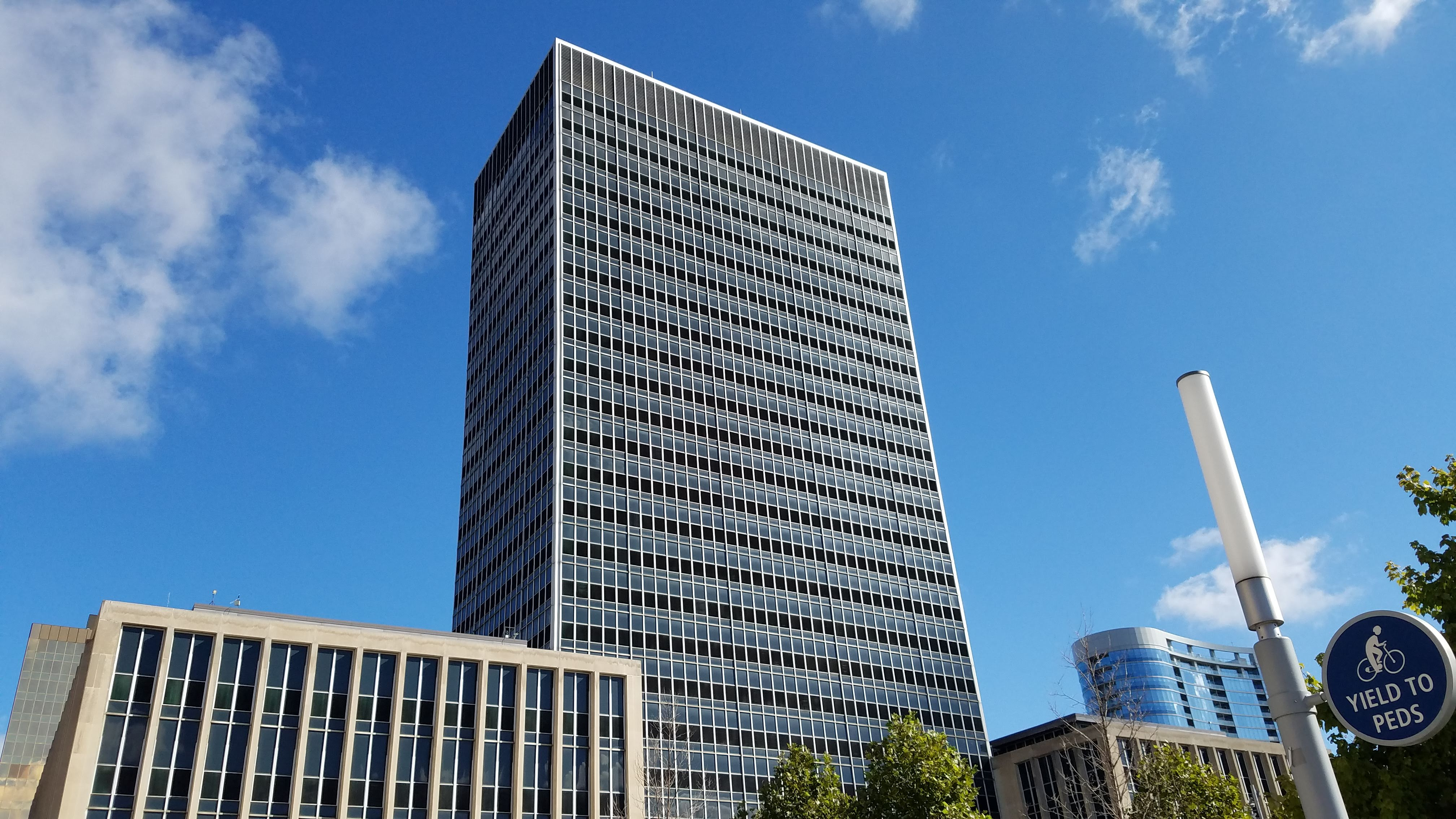
The Indiana Statehouse (left) anchors the west end of Market Street while the City–County Building (right) anchors the east.

As the location for several local, state, and federal government agencies and buildings, downtown Indianapolis is home to a large concentration of white-collar workers with roles in public policy, law, advocacy, and public relations.

Located on Market Street, the City-County Building serves as the seat of the consolidated government of Indianapolis and Marion County. The office building houses the executive and legislative branches of local government as well as numerous municipal departments. The John Morton-Finney Center for Educational Services at Walnut and Delaware streets houses the administrative headquarters for Indianapolis Public Schools.

The Indiana Statehouse, located at the west end of Market Street, houses the executive, legislative, and judicial branches of Indiana's state government, including the offices of the governor and lieutenant governor of Indiana, the Indiana General Assembly, and the Indiana Supreme Court. Administrative offices for several state agencies are located in neighboring buildings, mainly the north and south buildings of the Indiana Government Center.

Several federal field offices are located in the Minton-Capehart Federal Building on Pennsylvania Street. The Birch Bayh Federal Building and United States Courthouse on Ohio Street houses the United States District Court for the Southern District of Indiana. The United States Postal Service operates two post offices downtown as well as its Indianapolis Processing and Distribution Center on South Street.

=== Leisure and hospitality ===
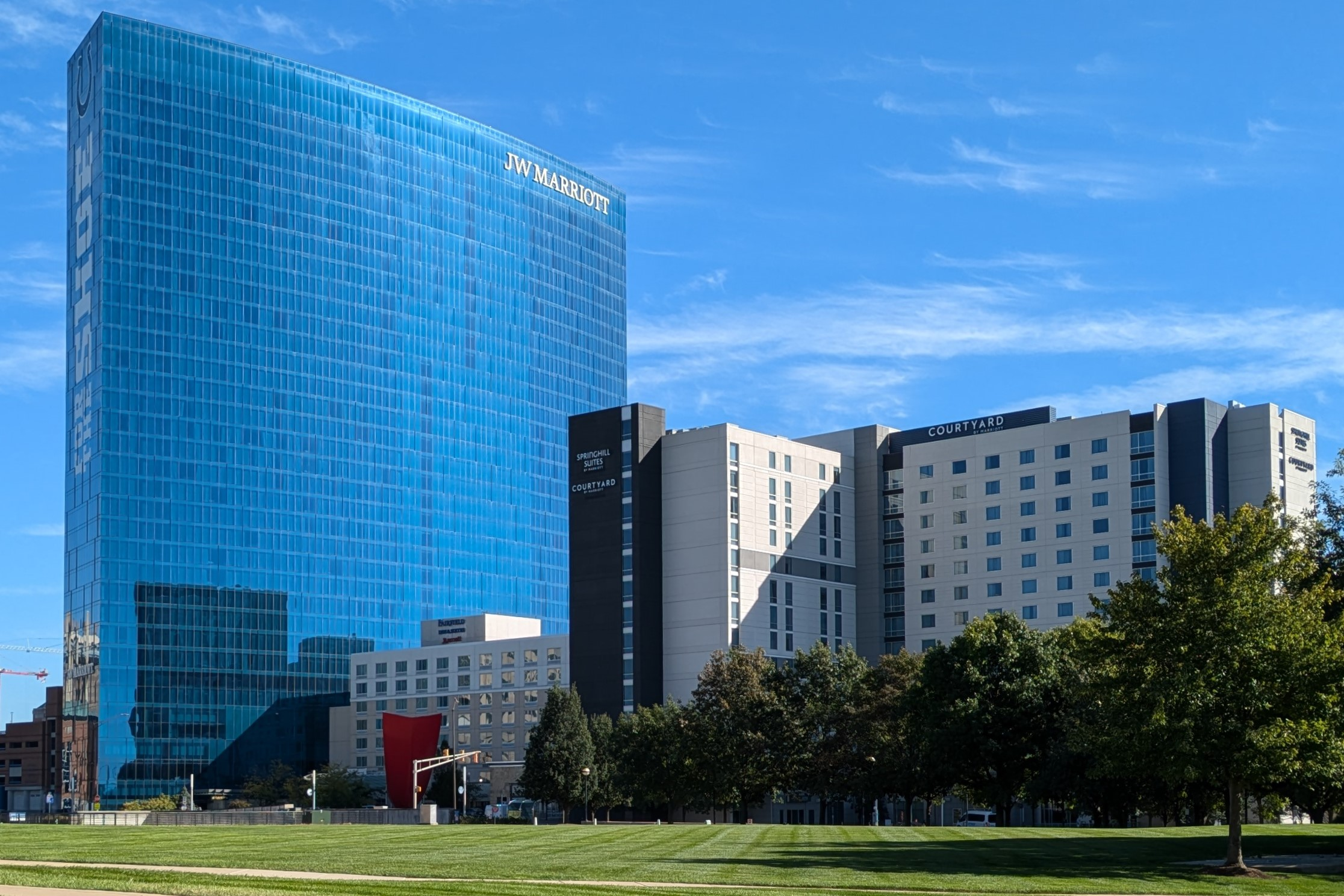
The JW Marriott Indianapolis and neighboring Marriott properties house more than 1,000 hotel rooms.

The hospitality industry is an increasingly vital sector to the Indianapolis economy, especially downtown. According to Visit Indy, 28.2 million visitors generated $4.9 billion in 2015, the fourth straight year of record growth. Indianapolis has long been a sport tourism destination, but has more recently relied on conventions. The Indiana Convention Center (ICC) and Lucas Oil Stadium are considered mega convention center facilities, with a combined 750,000 square feet (70,000 m^{2}) of exhibition space. ICC is connected via skyway to 12 hotels and 4,700 hotel rooms, the most of any convention center in the United States.

Most hotels are clustered in the blocks immediately adjacent to the Indiana Convention Center in downtown's southwest quadrant. According to Downtown Indy, Inc., there are 34 hotels with a total of 7,839 hotel rooms. Notable hotels include The Columbia Club, Conrad Indianapolis, the Hilton Garden Inn Indianapolis Downtown, the Hilton Indianapolis, Le Méridien Indianapolis, the Hyatt Regency Indianapolis, the Indianapolis Marriott Downtown, the JW Marriott Indianapolis, and the Omni Severin Hotel.

== Attractions ==
Recent developments in downtown Indianapolis include the construction of new mid- to high-rise buildings and the $275 million expansion of the Indiana Convention Center completed in 2011. After 12 years of planning and six years of construction, the Indianapolis Cultural Trail officially opened in 2013. The $62.5 million public-private partnership resulted in 8 miles (13 km) of urban bike and pedestrian corridors linking six cultural districts with neighborhoods, and significant arts, cultural, heritage, sports and entertainment venues in the downtown vicinity.

=== Dining ===
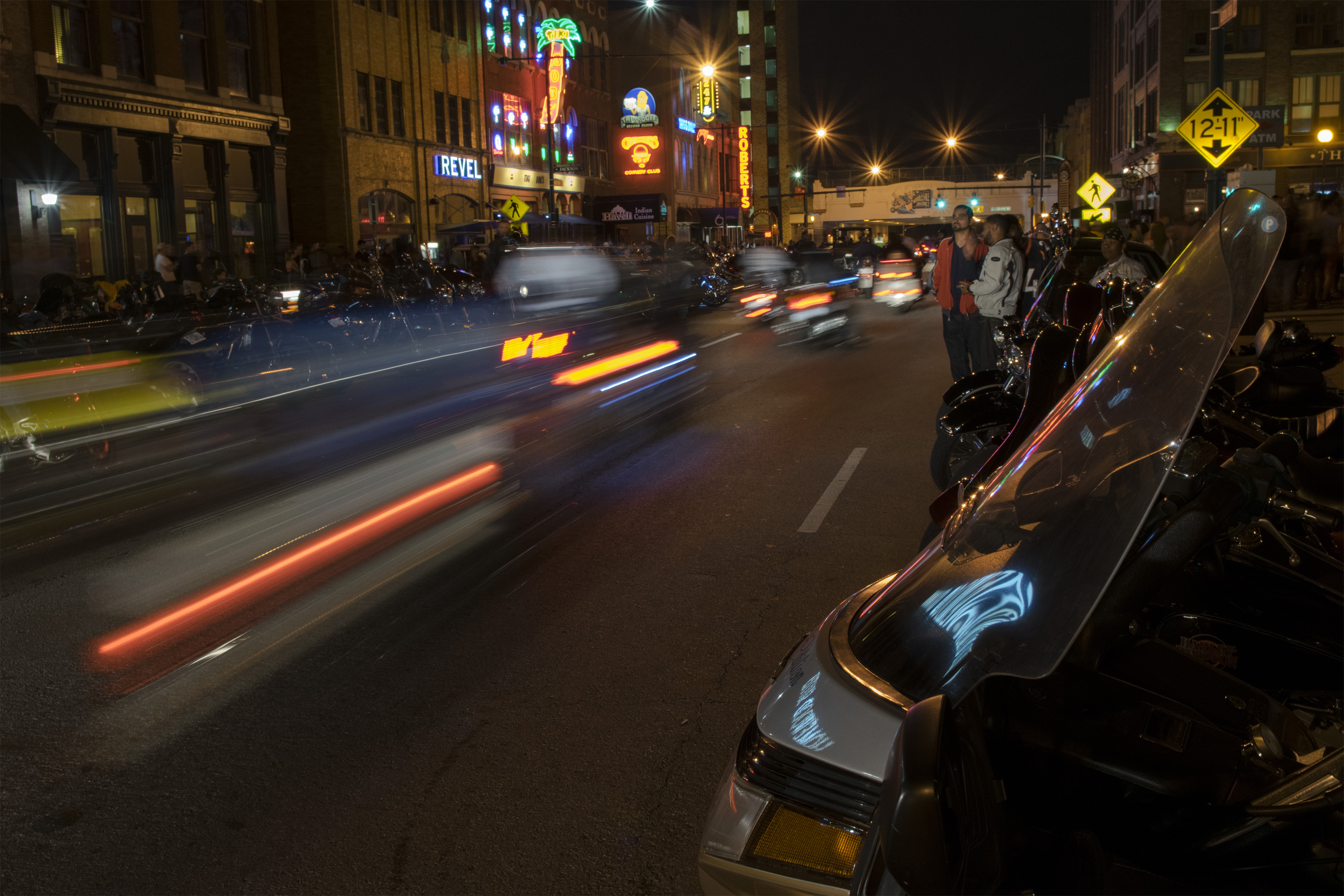
Nightlife along Meridian Street in the Wholesale District

Notable independent establishments, such as St. Elmo Steak House and Slippery Noodle Inn, mix with chains in the blocks surrounding Circle Centre Mall in downtown's Wholesale District. Massachusetts Avenue, one of the city's original diagonal streets, is lined with numerous local bars and eateries, like Vicino. Anchoring downtown's Market East district, the Indianapolis City Market features dozens of local food vendors that generally serve lunchtime patrons. Sun King Brewing is located about five blocks east in the neighboring Cole-Noble District. Since the 2010s, downtown's Fletcher Place neighborhood emerged as a popular dining destination. Other notable downtown eateries include Giorgio's Pizza on Market Street and Downtown Olly's on Illinois Street.

=== Entertainment ===
==== Athletics ====
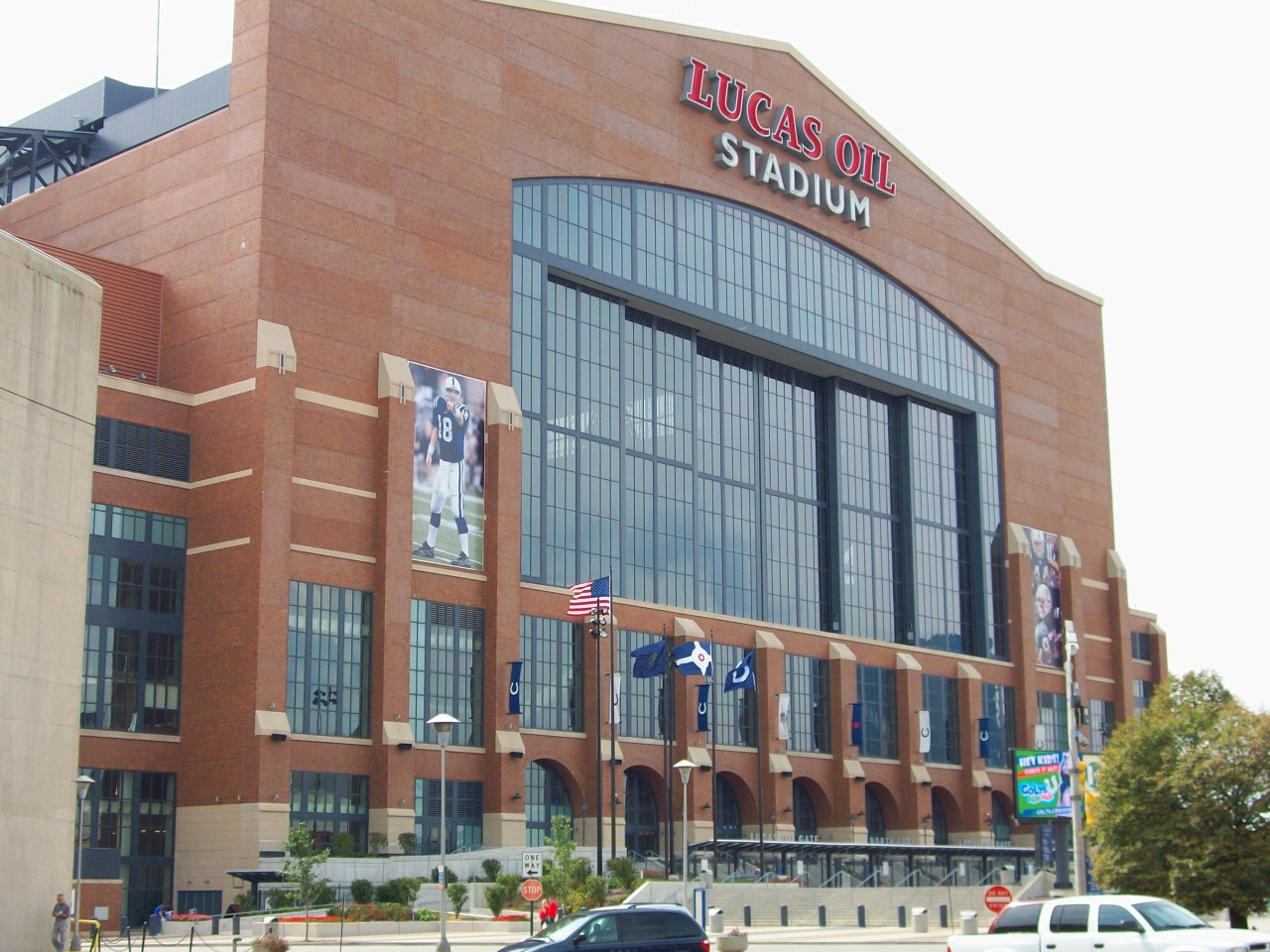
Lucas Oil Stadium

Indianapolis's professional sports clubs and facilities are located downtown south of Washington Street, including Gainbridge Fieldhouse (home to the Indiana Fever and the Indiana Pacers), Lucas Oil Stadium (home to the Indianapolis Colts), and Victory Field (home to the Indianapolis Indians). Other notable venues are located on the Indiana University Indianapolis campus in the northwestern section of downtown. The IU Indy Jaguars compete at the IUPUI Gymnasium, Indiana University Natatorium, and Carroll Stadium. The latter is also home to the Indy Eleven, the city's second-tier men's professional soccer team.

==== Performing arts ====
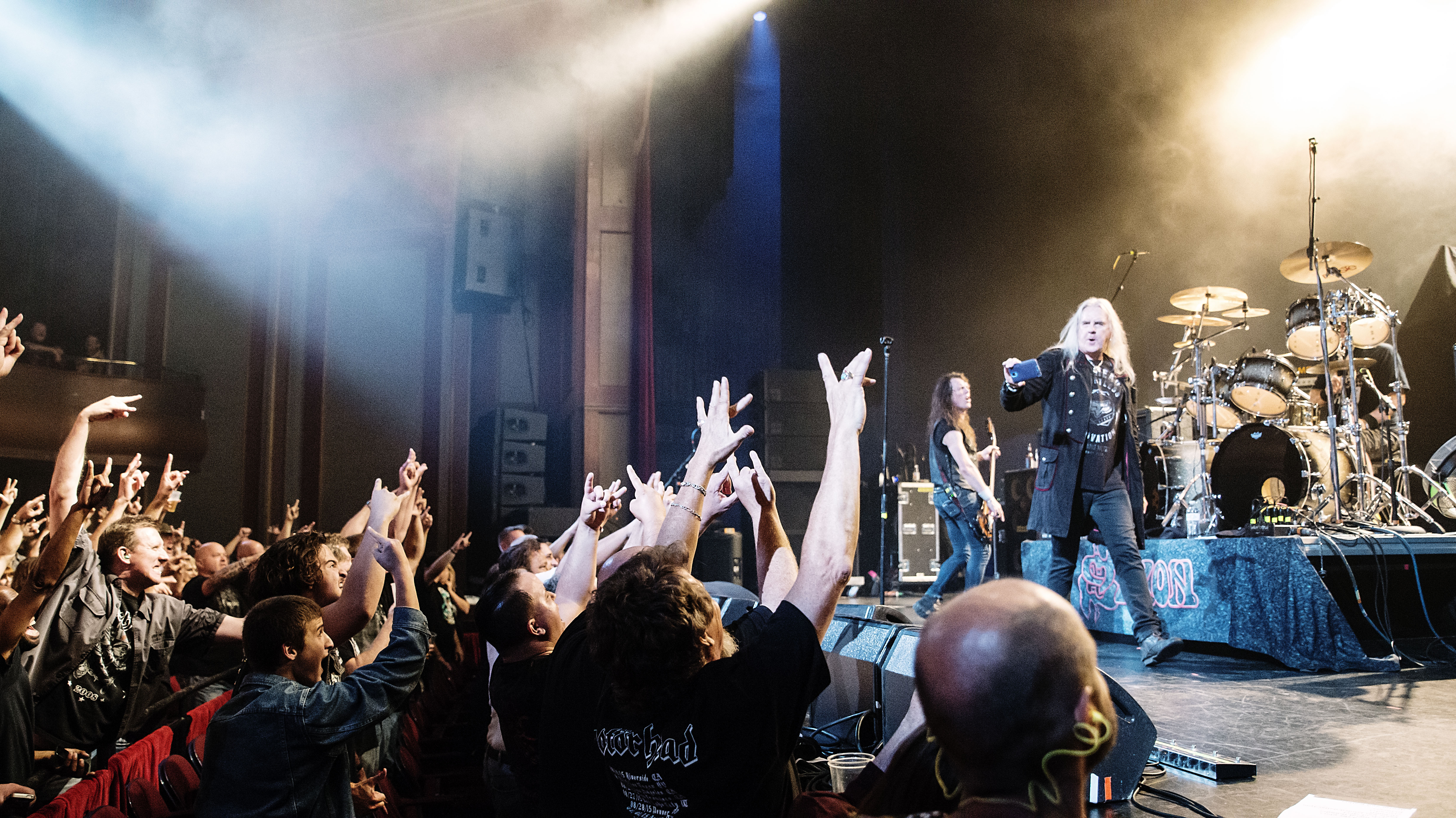
A concert at the Old National Centre

- Athenæum (Das Deutsche Haus)
- The Cabaret
- The District Theatre
- Everwise Amphitheater at White River State Park
- Hilbert Circle Theatre (Indianapolis Symphony Orchestra)
- Indiana Theatre (Indiana Repertory Theatre)
- Indianapolis Artsgarden
- IndyFringe Basile and Indy Eleven Theatres
- Madam Walker Legacy Center
- Old National Centre
- The Pavilion at Pan Am
- Phoenix Theatre

=== Monuments and memorials ===
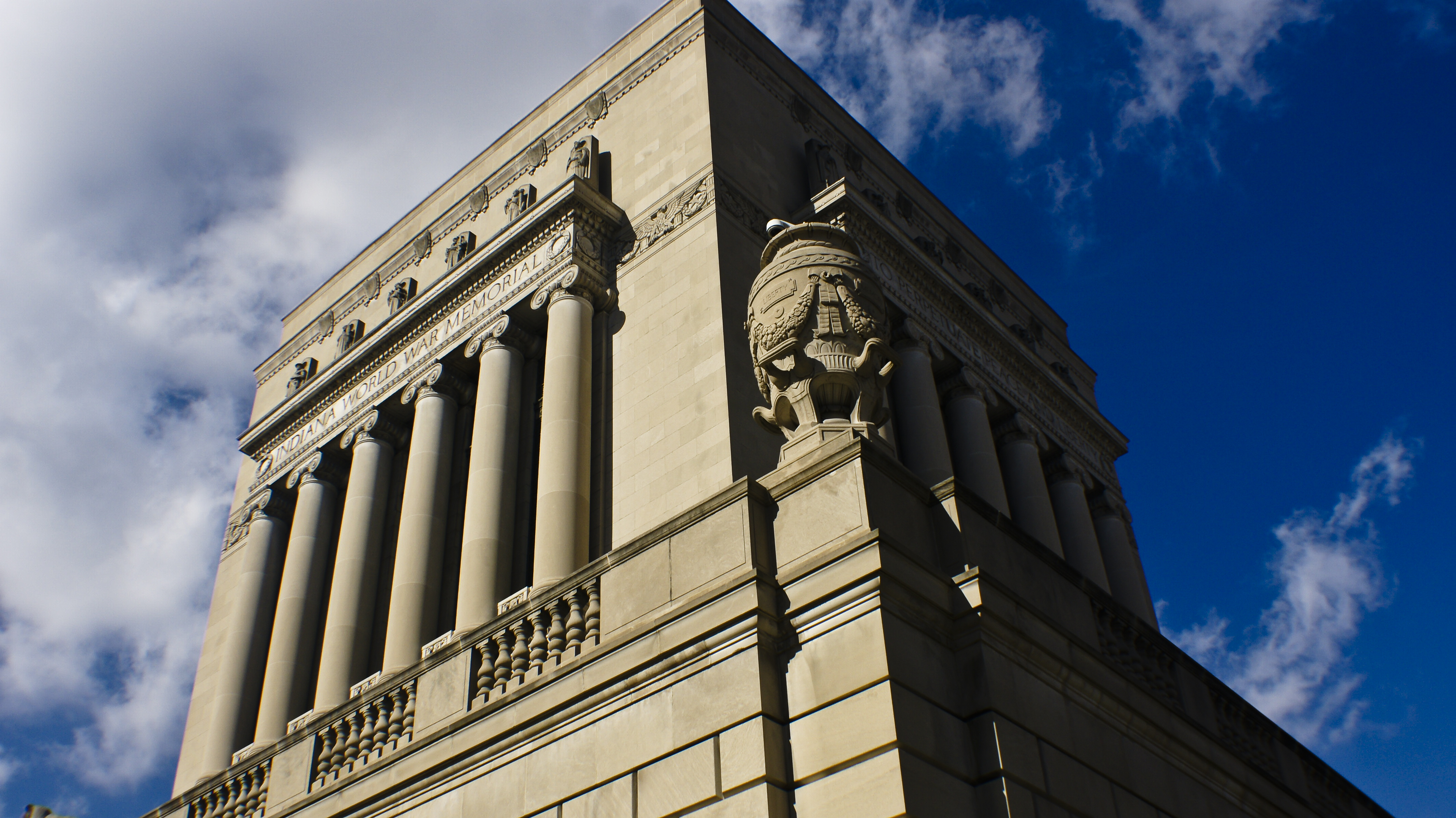
Indiana World War Memorial

- Fallen Firefighters Memorial Plaza
- Indiana 9/11 Memorial
- Indiana Law Enforcement and Firefighters Memorial
- Indiana World War Memorial Plaza
- Medal of Honor Memorial
- Peirce Geodetic Monument
- Soldiers' and Sailors' Monument
- USS Indianapolis National Memorial
- Wooden's Legacy

Note: For an overview and complete list of all memorials and monuments on the grounds of Indiana Government Center, see Indiana Statehouse Public Art Collection.

=== Museums and libraries ===
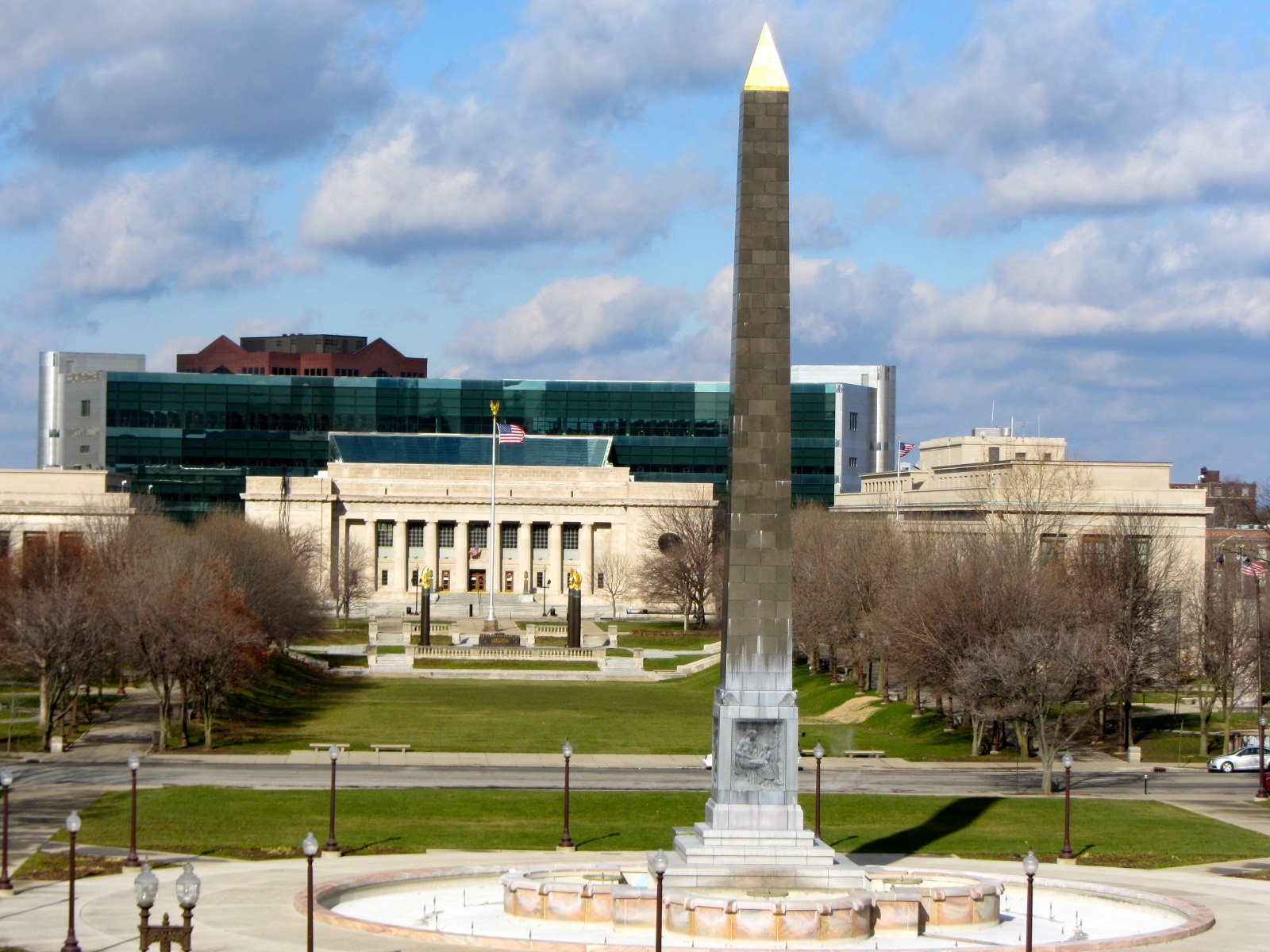
Central Library from the Indiana World War Memorial Plaza

Museums and libraries with collections of local, state, and national interest can be found in downtown Indianapolis, including the Indiana Historical Society and Indiana State Museum (both located along the Downtown Canal) and the state's largest public library, the Indiana State Library and Historical Bureau, is also located nearby at the intersection of Ohio Street and Senate Avenue. Neighboring White River State Park contains the Eiteljorg Museum of American Indians and Western Art and the NCAA Hall of Champions.

Indiana Avenue, in downtown's northwest quadrant, is home to the Crispus Attucks Museum and the Kurt Vonnegut Museum and Library. Nearby Cavanaugh Hall at IU Indianapolis is home to the Ray Bradbury Center. Located in downtown's northeast quadrant, the Mass Ave Cultural Arts District is home to the Indianapolis Firefighters Museum and James Whitcomb Riley Museum Home. Rhythm! Discovery Center is located in the Claypool Court near the intersection of Washington and Illinois streets.

Two of the city's three major Masonic landmarks—the Indianapolis Masonic Temple and Scottish Rite Cathedral—share the block of North Street between Meridian and Illinois streets. Immediately east across Meridian Street is the Indianapolis Public Library's Central Library and the five-block Indiana World War Memorial Plaza, home to the American Legion's Emil A. Blackmore Museum and the Indiana War Memorial Museum.

=== Parks and public spaces ===
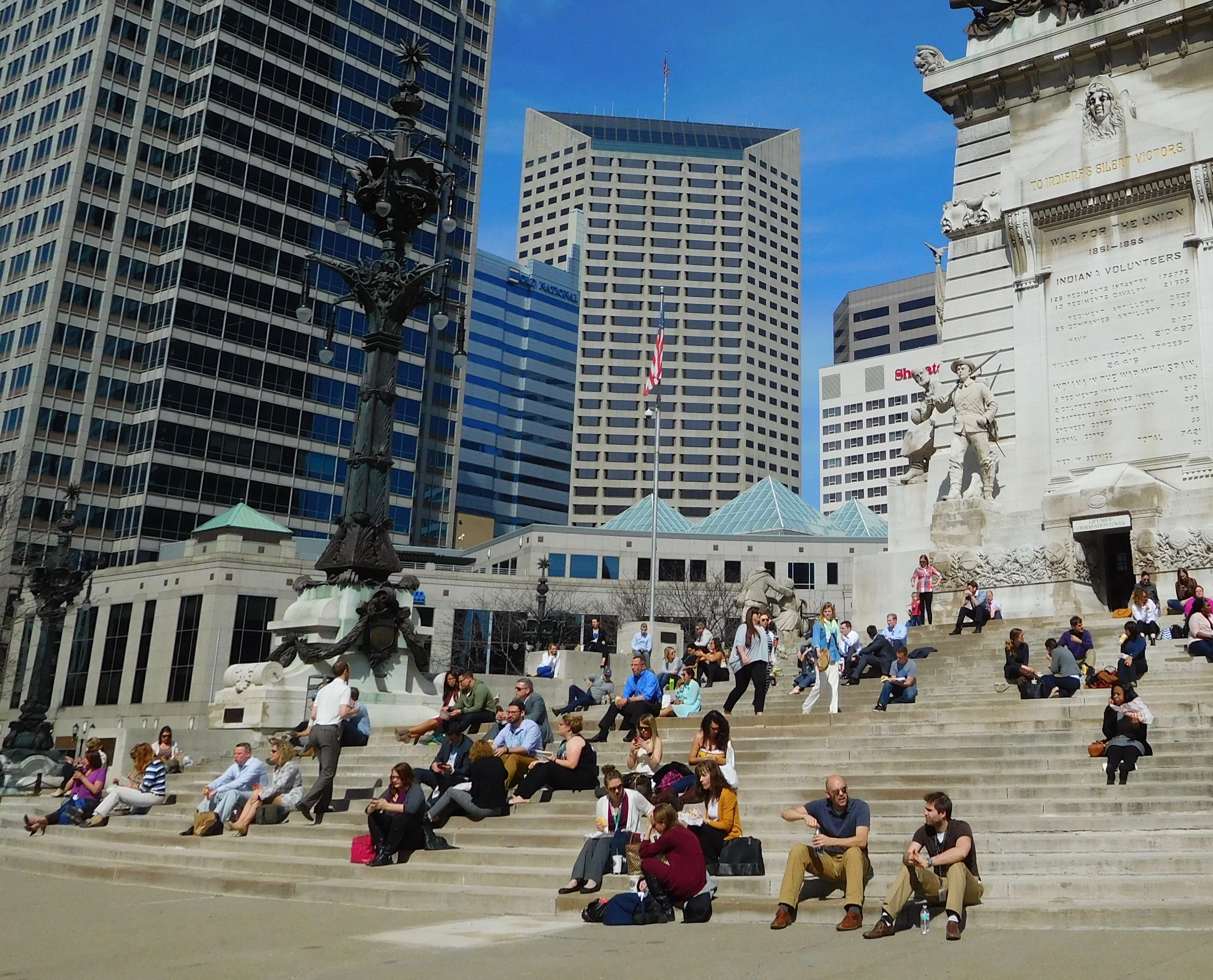
Monument Circle's public space serves as a hub for civic life in Indianapolis

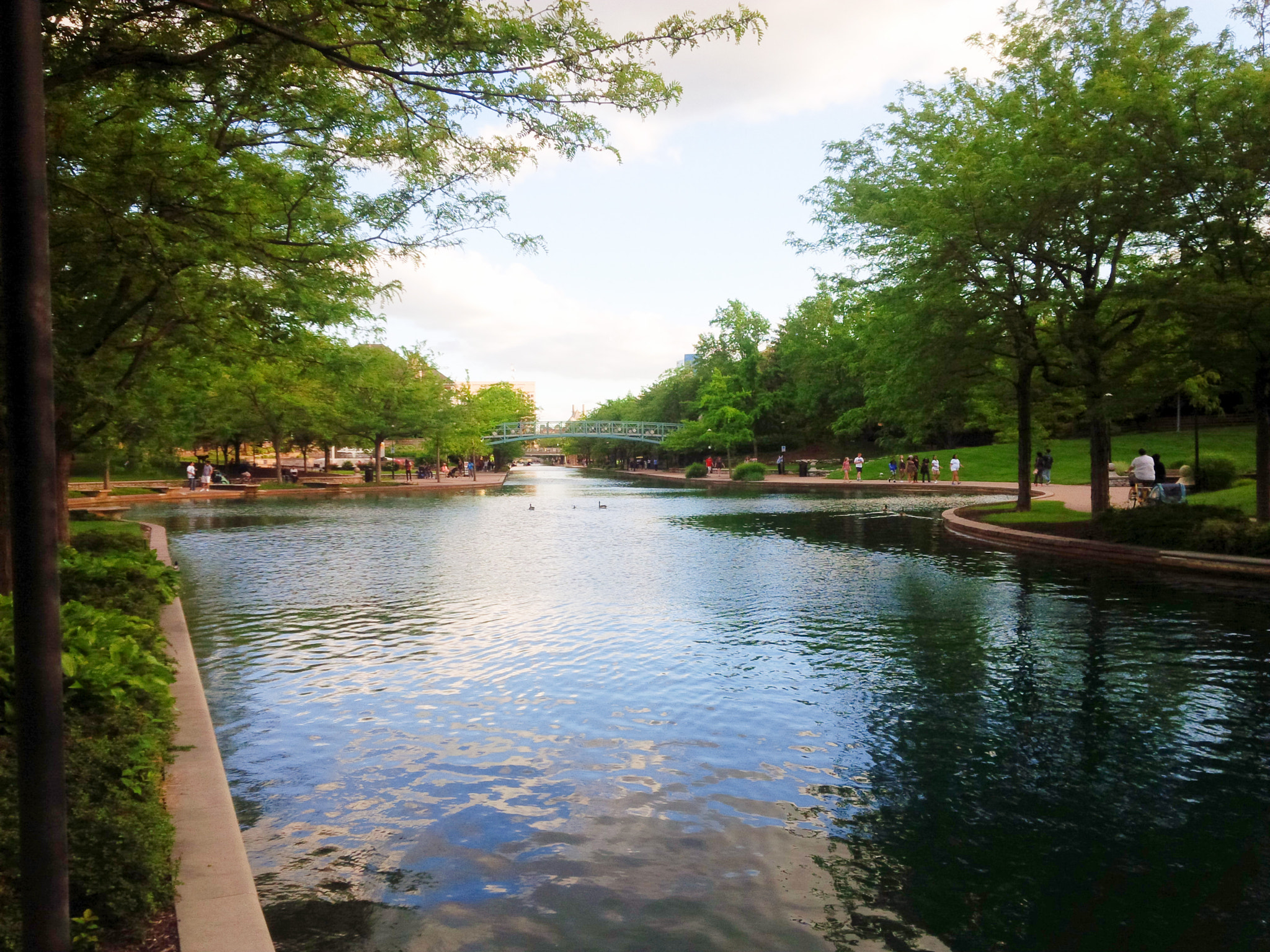
Walnut Street Commons, Downtown Canal

In 2021, downtown Indianapolis contained about 340 acres (140 ha) across 28 parks and plazas, owned and maintained by a patchwork of local and state agencies, nonprofit organizations, and other quasi-governmental entities. Downtown's largest public spaces include White River State Park and Military Park, covering about 250 acres (100 ha) and 14 acres (5.7 ha), respectively. Stretching over five city blocks, the Indiana World War Memorial Plaza contains three distinct downtown greenspaces: American Legion Mall, Veterans Memorial Plaza, and University Park.

The Indianapolis Cultural Trail is a privately managed 10-mile (16 km) linear park encircling downtown's central business district. From the trail's nonprofit operates Indiana Pacers Bikeshare and oversees placemaking efforts in prominent city-owned spaces, including the Downtown Canal, Georgia Street, Richard G. Lugar Plaza, and Monument Circle. Indy Parks maintains six municipal parks downtown: Babe Denny Park, Edna Balz Lacy Family Park, Lt. Jr. Gr. Graham Edward Martin Park, Pathways to Peace Garden, Presidential Place Park, and South Street Square Park.

Other notable downtown public spaces include: Ball Nurses' Sunken Garden and Convalescent Park at Indiana University Indianapolis; Bicentennial Plaza and surrounding Indiana Statehouse grounds; Charles L. Whistler Memorial Plaza at the Indianapolis City Market; Hudnut Commons, adjacent to the Indiana Convention Center; and Matthew R. Gutwein Commonground at Sidney & Lois Eskenazi Hospital. Morris Bicentennial Plaza is downtown's newest public space, having opened next to Gainbridge Fieldhouse in 2023.

== Education ==
Downtown's northwest quadrant is home to Indiana University Indianapolis and Purdue University in Indianapolis, which were combined as Indiana University–Purdue University Indianapolis until July 1, 2024. Notable schools on the campuses include the Herron School of Art and Design, Kelley School of Business, McKinney School of Law, O'Neill School of Public and Environmental Affairs, and the Indiana University School of Medicine, the largest medical school in the U.S.

Two public schools belonging to Indianapolis Public Schools (IPS) serve the downtown area: Center for Inquiry School 2 and Crispus Attucks High School. One private school, Lumen Christi Catholic School, is located in the southeast quadrant of downtown in Fletcher Place.

== Public health and safety ==
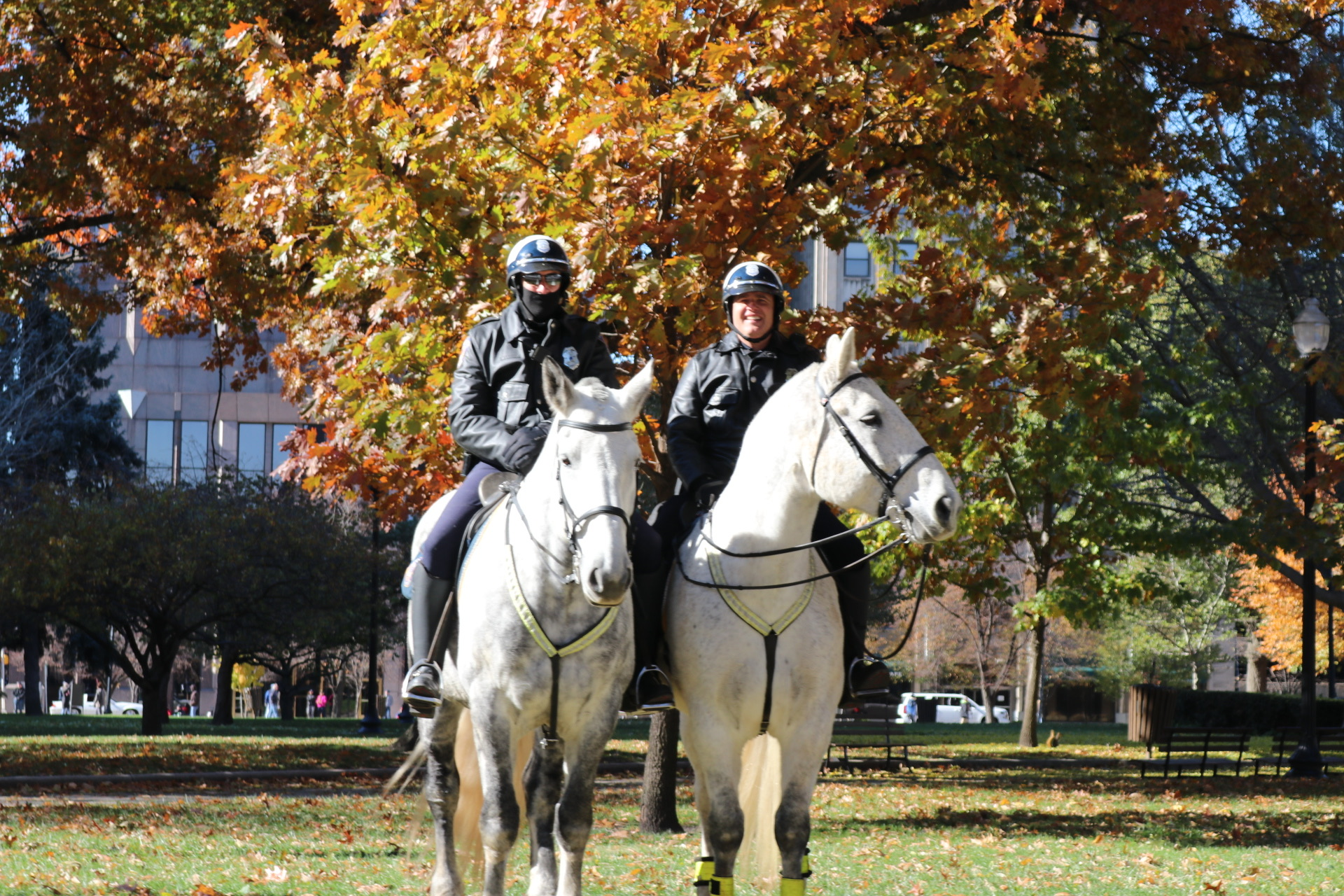
IMPD Mounted Patrol officers in University Park (2018)

Local law enforcement in downtown Indianapolis is primarily provided by the Indianapolis Metropolitan Police Department (IMPD), headquartered at the City-County Building. The Marion County Sheriff's Office is responsible for overseeing the building's security. IMPD's Downtown District is the smallest of the agency's six districts, covering about 3.5 square miles (9.1 km^{2}) and staffing 80 officers.

Other law enforcement agencies with a downtown presence include: the Capitol Police Section of the Indiana State Police, responsible for securing the State Government Complex; the United States Federal Protective Service, charged with protecting downtown's two federal buildings; and the IU Police Department, serving the IU Indianapolis campus.

Downtown is home to the Indianapolis Fire Department's headquarters and stations 7 and 13.

=== Hospitals ===
Downtown's northwest quadrant is home to the largest cluster of healthcare facilities in the region. Indiana University Health and the Indiana University School of Medicine form an academic medical center that includes University Hospital and Riley Hospital for Children in an area roughly bounded by 10th Street (north), Michigan Street (south), University Boulevard (east), and Riley Hospital Drive (west). IU Health Methodist Hospital is located on 16th Street in the neighboring Near Northside. The city's primary public medical centers, Sidney & Lois Eskenazi Hospital and the Richard L. Roudebush VA Medical Center, are situated immediately west of the Indiana University Medical Center in an area bounded by 10th Street (north), Michigan Street (south), Eskenazi Avenue (east), and Porto Alegre Street (west).

== Transportation ==
Downtown Indianapolis has been the regional transportation hub for central Indiana since its establishment. The first major federally funded highway in the U.S., the National Road (now Washington Street), reached Indianapolis in 1836, followed by the railroad in 1847. Indianapolis Union Station opened in 1853 as the world's first union station. Citizen's Street and Railway Company was established in 1864, operating the city's first mule-drawn streetcar line. Opened in 1904 on Market Street, the Indianapolis Traction Terminal was the largest interurban station in the world, handling 500 trains daily and 7 million passengers annually. Ultimately doomed by the automobile, the terminal closed in 1941, followed by the city's streetcar system in 1957.

Two of the region's four interstate highways (Interstate 65 and Interstate 70) form an "inner loop" on the north, east, and south sides of downtown Indianapolis. I-65 and I-70 radiate from downtown to connect with the "outer loop," a beltway called Interstate 465.

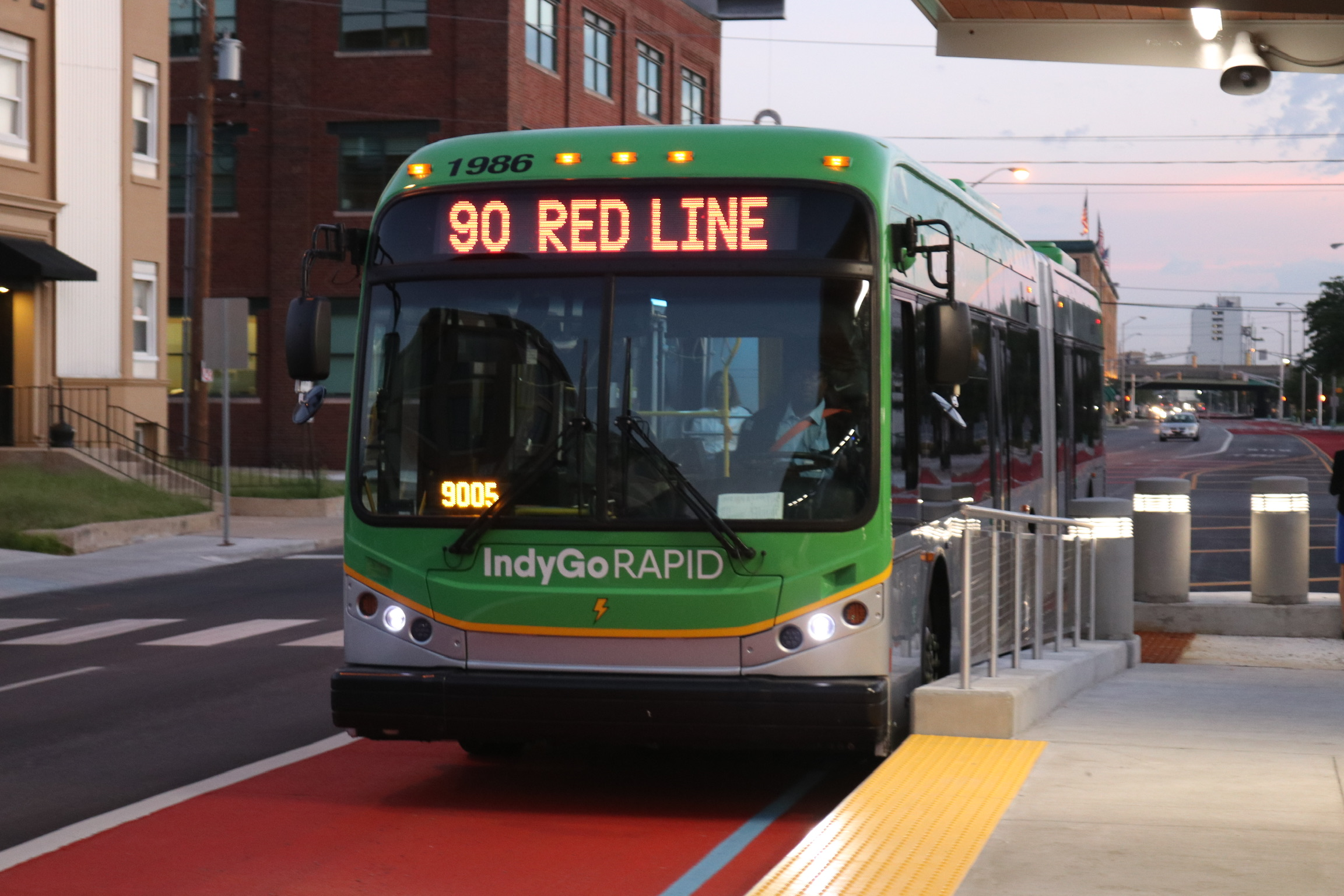
An IndyGo Red Line battery-electric bus arrives at 9th Street Station

IndyGo operates the city's public transit network, with downtown Indianapolis serving as the region's hub and spoke origin. In 2016, the Julia M. Carson Transit Center opened as the downtown hub for 27 of its 31 bus routes. The Central Indiana Regional Transportation Authority is headquartered in downtown Indianapolis. The quasi-governmental agency provides commuter bus service and oversees regional carpool and vanpool programs.

Downtown Indianapolis continues to be the city's intercity transportation hub. Amtrak provides intercity rail service via the Cardinal, which makes three weekly trips between New York City and Chicago. Union Station served about 30,000 passengers in 2015. Three intercity bus service providers stop in the city: Greyhound Lines and Burlington Trailways (via Union Station), and Megabus (via City Market).

The Indianapolis Airport Authority operates the Indianapolis Downtown Heliport, which opened for public use in 1979.

== Utilities ==
AES Indiana, the city's electricity provider, is headquartered on Monument Circle. Citizens Energy Group's Perry K. Generating Station burns natural gas to produce steam to provide heat and hot water to 200 customers as part of the downtown district heating system.

== See also ==
- List of tallest buildings in Indianapolis
- List of central business districts
