= Lockerbie Square Historic District =

Historic district in Indianapolis, Indiana, US

- U.S. National Register of Historic Places
- U.S. Historic district
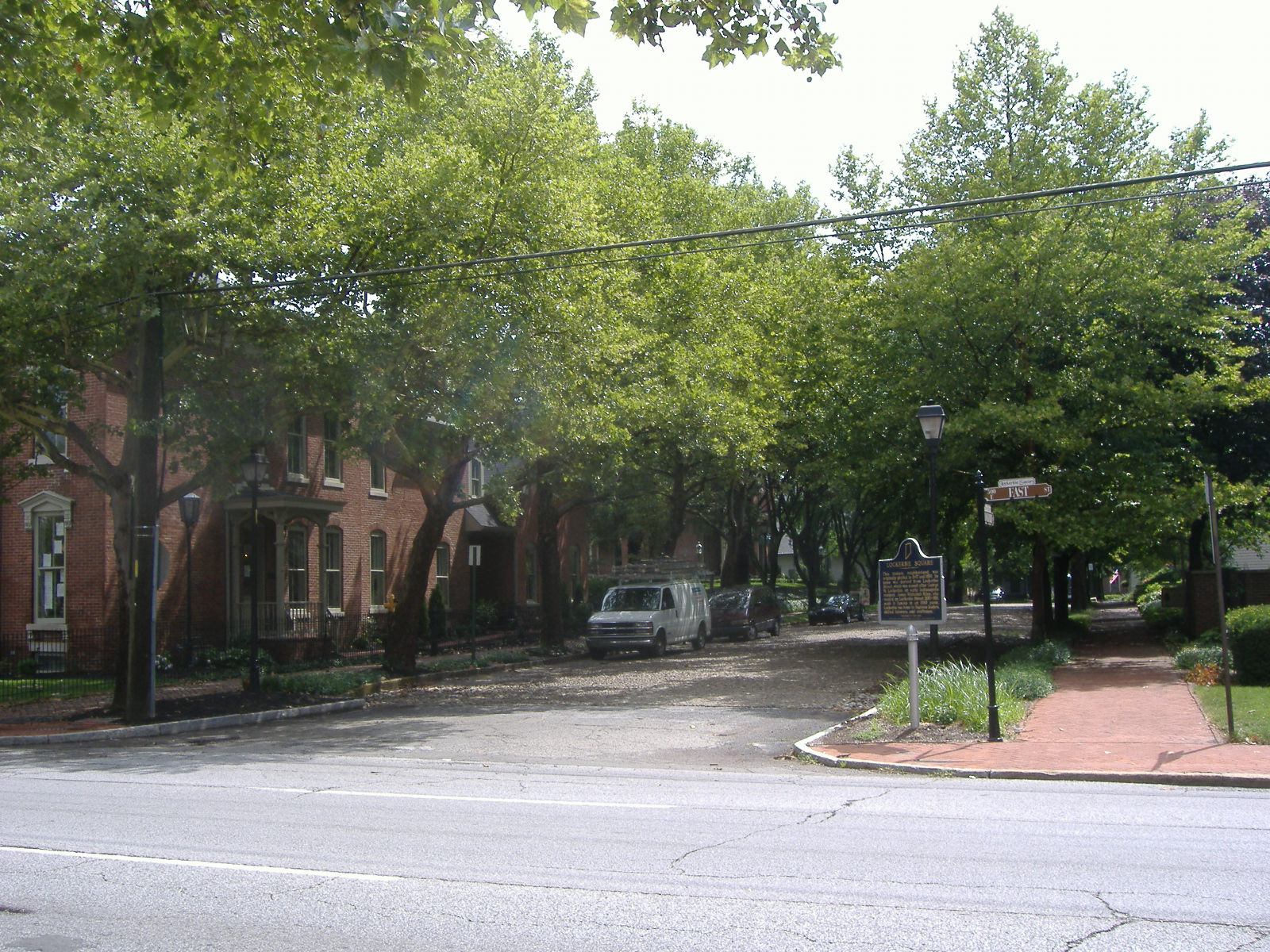
- North East Street and Lockerbie Street is the location of the Lockerbie Square Historic Marker

- Location within Indianapolis Location within Indianapolis Location within Indiana Location within the United States
- Location: bounded by Michigan and Davidson Sts., New York Ave., and New Jersey St., Indianapolis, Indiana
- Coordinates: 39°46′20″N 86°08′50″W
- Area: 10.9 acres (4.4 ha)
- NRHP reference No.: 73000038, 87000734 (Boundary Increase)
- Added to NRHP: February 23, 1973, July 28, 1987 (Boundary Increase)

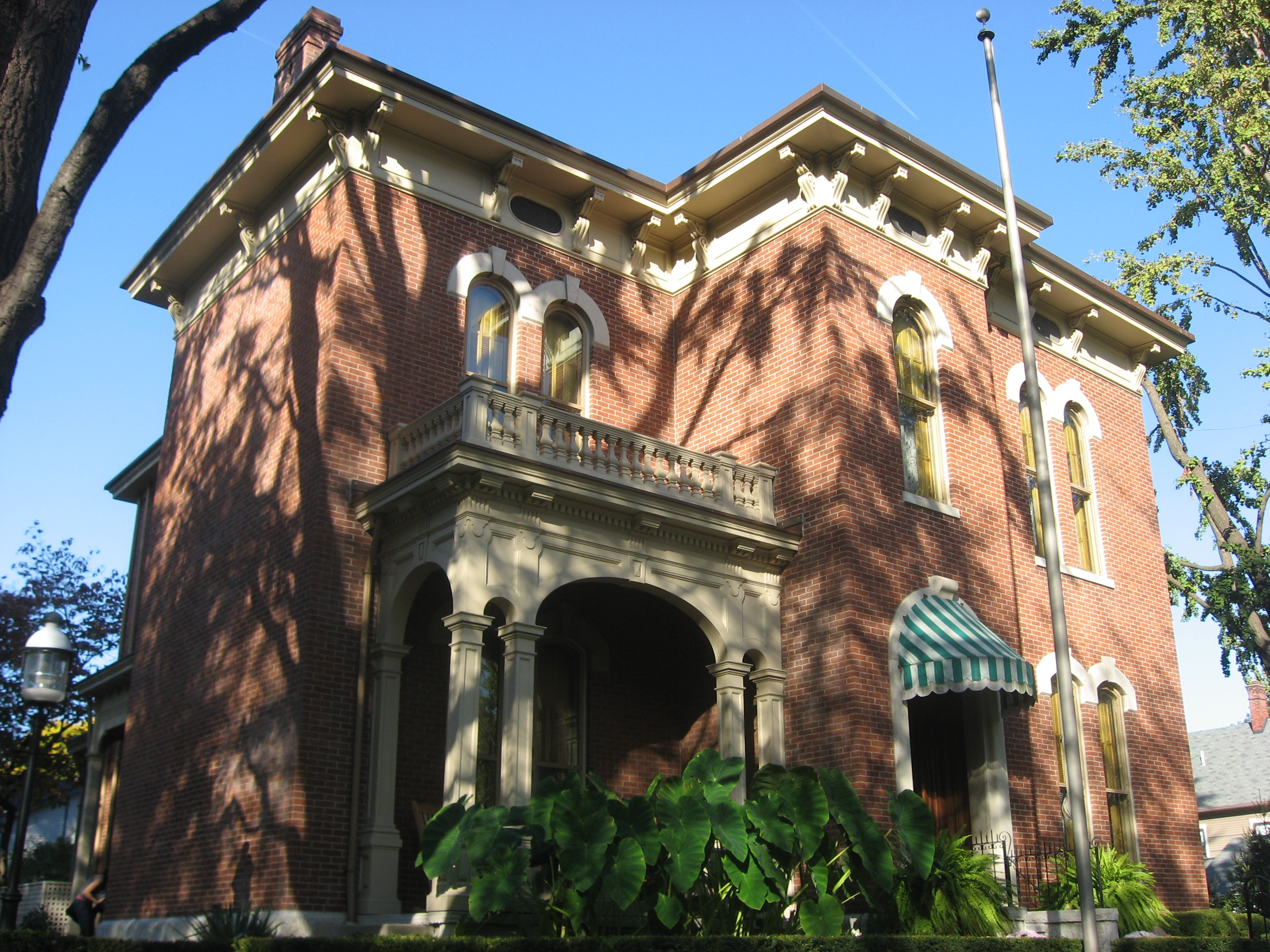
James Whitcomb Riley Museum Home

Lockerbie Square Historic District is a national historic district on the National Register of Historic Places within Indianapolis, Indiana, listed on February 23, 1973, with a boundary increase on July 28, 1987. It is noted for its Federal, Italianate, and Queen Anne style architecture. The original platting of Lockerbie Square, done by Jannett Smith Lockerbie McOuat and named for her father, Scottish immigrant George Murray Lockerbie, was between 1847 and 1850. The 1960s saw an immense effort to save the buildings within the district, becoming the first historic district in Indianapolis. Many of the buildings date from 1855 to 1930. James Whitcomb Riley, famed Hoosier poet, lived in the district for over two decades. He was known to give candy to local children on his regular walks.

== History ==
Lockerbie Square is the oldest intact residential neighborhood of Indianapolis. Lockerbie is located on the northeast side of Alexander Ralston's Plat of Indianapolis at the intersection of East Street and New York Street. The western border of the district is East Street, so named as it was the original eastern boundary of Indianapolis. The neighborhood is directly south of the Mass Ave Cultural District and north of the Cole-Noble District. At only 3/4 mile (1.2 km) away from Monument Circle, Lockerbie Square was one of Indianapolis' earliest walkable suburbs.

At one point, it was called Germantown, due to the numerous German immigrants living in the district starting in 1849.

The housing demand in the 1880s caused the Lockerbie District to prosper and grow.

After World War I, residents of means moved to northern Indianapolis. The neighborhood decayed until the restoration efforts of the 1960s and 1970s began. The newly founded Historic Landmarks Foundation of Indiana helped to restore the area, basing their renovations on the preservation techniques practiced at the German Village of Columbus, Ohio.

In 2021, the Indianapolis Propylaeum recorded an hour-long videographic history of the area, which includes many before and after photographs depicting the transformation of the neighborhood.

== Notable buildings ==
Among the notable buildings in the district are:

- James Ray-Buscher House was the home of former Indiana governor James B. Ray, who served as governor from 1825 to 1831. Built in 1835, it is reputed to be the oldest house in Indianapolis that is still extant. It was not originally built in the district, having been moved to its current location in 1977 from where the Marion County jail now stands.
- James Whitcomb Riley Museum Home was the residence of James Whitcomb Riley in the last two decades of his life.
- 628 E. Vermont Street residence was built in the late 20th century, but due to it being built to complement the 1800s architecture, the Historic Landmarks Foundation of Indiana gave it its "New Construction Award."
- Reading-Kindell Cottage was built in 1856. It is across from the Riley Museum, and was where the housekeeper resided. She had inherited all the housegoods in the Holstein home, but was paid for them in order to preserve the integrity of the Riley Museum's interior.
- Athenæum (Das Deutsche Haus) was built in 1893 and is the most ornate and best preserved building affiliated with the German American community of Indianapolis. Once used as a German American turnverein and clubhouse, it currently houses many groups, organizations, and businesses.
- Heritage Hall was built in 1876 and formerly served as the national headquarters of Phi Kappa Psi fraternity. It was fully renovated in 2010 and transformed into two distinct properties, 331 East Street and 510 Lockerbie Street, on the northeast corner of Lockerbie and East streets.
- St. Mary's Catholic Church is a Roman Catholic church built 1910 to 1912 in the Gothic Revival style and modeled after the Cologne Cathedral in Germany.
- Other structures include Joseph Staub House (1859), William and Netty Holler House (1864), Despa House (c. 1870), and Webber House (c. 1870).

== Tours ==
A walking tour designed by Historic Landmarks Foundation of Indiana and the Lockerbie Square People's Club takes visitors past twenty-five historic residences and five newer ones that, like the North Vermont Street Home, were designed to complement the existing structures.

== See also ==
- Riley Birthplace and Museum
- List of neighborhoods in Indianapolis
- National Register of Historic Places listings in Center Township, Marion County, Indiana
