= Sun King Brewing =

American brewing company

- Location: Indianapolis, Indiana, US
- Opened: 2009
- Annual production volume: 18,000 US beer barrels (21,000 hL) (2012)
- Owner: Dave Colt; Clay Robinson; Omar Robinson; Andy Fagg; Steve Koers
- Website: http://sunkingbrewing.com/

Active beers
Name	Type
Osiris Pale Ale	Pale ale
Wee Mac	Scottish-Style Ale
Sunlight Cream Ale	Cream ale
Pachanga	Mexican-Style Lager
Keller Haze	India Pale Ale
Orange Vanilla Sunlight	Cream ale

Seasonal beers
Name	Type
Fistful of Hops Series	India Pale Ale
Big H	Hefeweizen
Cream Dream Series	India Pale Ale
Dominator	Doppelbock
GFJ	India Pale Ale
El Gallo Negro	Black I.P.A.
Firefly	Belgian-Style Wit
Maibock	Maibock
Malus Pi	Fruit beer
Oktoberfest	Marzen
Popcorn Pilsner	Pilsner
Ring of Dingle	Stout
Sink the Clipper	Extra Special Bitter
Zaius	Oatmeal stout

Sun King Brewing is a brewery in the Cole-Noble District of Indianapolis, Indiana, United States. It is the largest brewery in Indianapolis and the second-largest brewery in the state. In 2011, Sun King won eight medals, including four gold medals, total at the Great American Beer Festival. Sun King was the first commercial brewery to open up in approximately 30 years in Indianapolis.

== History ==
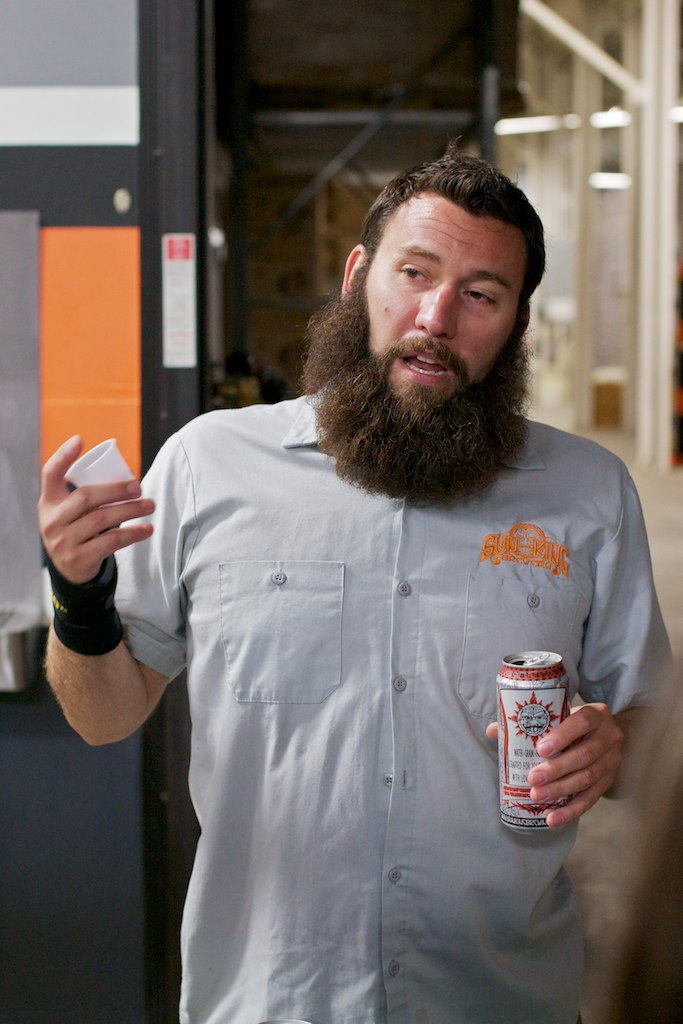
Clay Robinson in 2012

Sun King Brewing was founded in July, 2009 by Dave Colt and Clay Robinson. Robinson and Colt previously worked together at various brewpubs in Indianapolis. Colt worked at Circle V., which closed in 1999, and Robinson worked at Rock Bottom Brewery. They met while working at Ram Restaurant & Brewery. Robinson quit his job in July 2008 and started planning to start a business. They had three additional partners, including Robinson's father, Omar. Later that year, they acquired their current property in Downtown Indianapolis. They brewed their first batch of beer on July 1, 2009. The name Sun King was inspired by the sun and its importance in life cycles and beermaking.

In 2010, Sun King started packaging their beer in beer cans. They attended the Great American Beer Festival in 2011, and won eight medals, including four gold. By 2011, they were producing 5,000 barrels of beer. That year, Sun King replaced their 15-barrel system with a 30-barrel system. The tanks were made by Poynter Sheet Metal. They also started selling their beer outside of the metropolitan Indianapolis area, expanding to sell in Bloomington, Indiana. Sun King distributed approximately 50 miles outside of Indianapolis by 2012. The first time Sun King was shipped outside of Indiana was for the 2012 Great American Beer Festival.

Sun King produced 18,000 barrels of beer in 2012 with a revenue of $5 million. As of 2013, the brewery had produced 15,000 barrels of beer, with 35 full-time and 50 part-time employees. That same year, Sun King was named best Indiana beer by Nuvo Newsweekly readers. It was their fourth time in a row winning the title. The brewery announced that it will expand by 2016, investing $2.1 million in updated equipment and additional staff. An additional $3.9 million will be spent on expanding the brewery facility, making room for 240 fermentation tanks. These investments are in lieu of tax credits offered to the brewery and approved by the Indiana Economy Development Corporation. It has been voted one of the best small workplaces in Indiana by the Indianapolis Star.

Until 2017, when distribution was extended into Illinois, Sun King beer was sold only in Indiana. The brewery distributes their products to over 700 businesses in the state. Their beer is sold at Victory Field and at Lucas Oil Stadium. Sun King sponsored and planned the CANvitational, the first canned beer festival in the Midwest.

== Beer ==
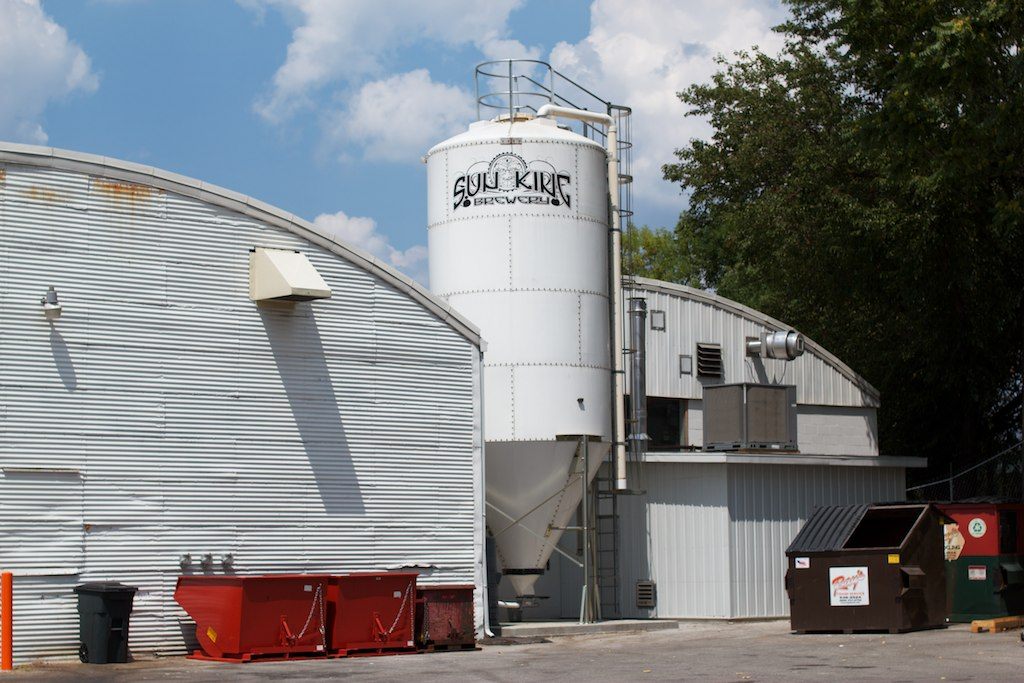
Sun King's downtown Indianapolis brewery in 2012.

Sun King has three House Beers: Wee Mac Scottish Ale, a Scottish brown ale, Osiris Pale Ale, a pale ale, and Sunlight Cream Ale, a cream ale. Also brewed yearly, "Fistful of Hops" Seasonal IPA a quarterly series of four IPAs, each with the same malt base. Sun King makes a variety of specialty or limited and seasonal beers. Many are only available at the brewery or at special events. Java Mac, a coffee flavored version of Wee Mac, was awarded a gold medal in the 2011 Great American Beer Festival in the Coffee Beer category. In 2012, their Velvet Fog, a Belgian strong dark ale, was awarded the gold medal at the World Beer Cup. They have two limited beers, 2nd Five Pappy van Muckle and Velvet Fog in Pappy van Winkle which are aged in Pappy Van Winkle's Family Reserve barrels. Their Pappy van Muckle won a silver medal at the 2012 Great American Beer Festival. Their Popcorn Pilsner uses Indiana grown popcorn. The brewmasters air pop the popcorn, add it into the mash to give the beer a light popcorn flavor. Sun King uses local ingredients when possible, including crab apples and masa. The masa has been used to make malt liquor.

For their fourth anniversary, Sun King created Grapefruit Jungle/GFJ, an American IPA using a unique blend of hops. Sun King partnered with Three Floyds Brewing to produce Royal Brat, an extra special bitter. They have also partnered with Oskar Blues Brewery to produce Chaka and in 2012, The Deuce, specifically for the Great American Beer Festival. Chaka was named one of the best beers of 2012 by Esquire. Sun King's house beer, Osiris, was voted the best beer to represent the Indianapolis Colts by Today and one of "15 Awesome Craft Beers in a Can" by The Huffington Post. In 2013, Sun King was the official beer of Gen Con. That year, Sun King won an award for "Most Creative Names" for Bitch'n Camaro, bronze in the barley wine category for Johan the Barleywine, and silver in the wood barrel aged sour category for Stupid Sexy Flanders at the U.S. Open Beer Championship. Sun King also produces a beer called "Naptown Brown" for the Naptown Roller Girls roller derby league.

Their main yeast provider is the Colorado based company, Brewing Science. Sun King sells their beer in four packs of 16 ounce cans. As of 2012, they were using cans made by the Ball Corporation. In 2013, Sun King introduced a resealable can, made by Ball, called Alumi-Tec. Sun King was the first brewery in Indiana to can its beer.

== Tasting room ==
Sun King has a tasting room. Visitors can sample various available beers for purchase by the pint, fill growlers, and buy cans of beer to go. It is open every day, and upwards of 1,000 people can visit the tasting room on a Friday night. In 2019, Sun King Brewing was named the 19th most popular attraction in Indianapolis, with 175,000 visitors.

== See also ==
- List of microbreweries
- List of breweries in Indiana
- Barrel-aged beer
- List of attractions and events in Indianapolis
