= Wooden's Legacy =

Public artwork by Jeffrey Rouse

- Artist: Jeffrey A. Rouse
- Year: 2012
- Type: Bronze sculpture
- Location: Indianapolis; 39°45′51.26″N 86°9′30.1″W
- Owner: City of Indianapolis

Wooden's Legacy is a public artwork by American artist Jeffrey Rouse that is located on the west corner of Georgia and Meridian Streets, in Indianapolis, Indiana. The bronze sculpture, which was unveiled on March 9, 2012, depicts Indiana-born college basketball coach John Wooden in a crouching position in the act of coaching. He is surrounded by five basketball players represented as sets of legs, each in a style that depicts an era from Wooden's career. On and around the base are words and quotes that define Wooden's coaching philosophy, including his "Pyramid of Success".

== Description ==
The sculpture depicts coach John Wooden crouching on an oversized basketball, holding a rolled up set of papers in his left hand and gesturing with his right hand. His mouth is open as he faces east towards Gainbridge Fieldhouse, the city's largest basketball arena. Wooden was born in Hall, Indiana, played basketball at Purdue University, and then later took his first college coaching position at Indiana State Teachers College, which is now called Indiana State University.

Surrounding Wooden are five players idealized as sets of men's legs, each wearing basketball shoes and socks that are representative of pivotal years in Wooden's career. Each shoe is made to look like the year it was worn and is marked on the back quarter with a year or word:

"1930" - The year Wooden received his first All-American honor as a player at Purdue
"1946" - The year he began his coaching career at the Indiana Teacher's College (now Indiana State University)
"1964" - The year he won his first NCAA championship and was named Coach of the Year at University of California, Los Angeles
"1975" - His last of year coaching and his final and 10th NCAA championship
"Beyond" - A shoe from today indicating his ongoing legacy

The sculpture rests on a concrete base that has words associated with Wooden's "Pyramid of Success" surrounding the upper area. To the lower side there is a famous quote by Wooden:

Success is peace of mind attained only through self satisfaction in knowing you made the effort to do the best of which you're capable.

— John R. Wooden

== Historical information ==
The sculpture was unveiled on March 9, 2012, as a gift from the 2012 Indianapolis Super Bowl Host Committee to the City of Indianapolis. It was placed on the renovated Georgia Street, which had been made into an entertainment-centered area that was used extensively during the 2012 Super Bowl, which was held at Lucas Oil Stadium.

=== Critical reception ===
Shortly after the piece was unveiled, local news sources began to consider the artwork. Bill Littlefield of National Public Radio's Only A Game wrote about the artwork after a visit to Indianapolis and Indianapolis newspapers later considered the merits of the artwork. Wooden's grandson, Craig Impleman, celebrated the artwork by saying, "When viewing the statue my expectations were met and exceeded."

== Artist ==
Jeffrey Rouse is an Indiana-born and New York City-based sculptor who also has a dental practice with offices in both Manhattan and Hicksville.
