= James Whitcomb Riley Museum Home =

Building in Indianapolis, Indiana, US

- James Whitcomb Riley House
- U.S. National Register of Historic Places
- U.S. National Historic Landmark
- U.S. Historic district – Contributing property
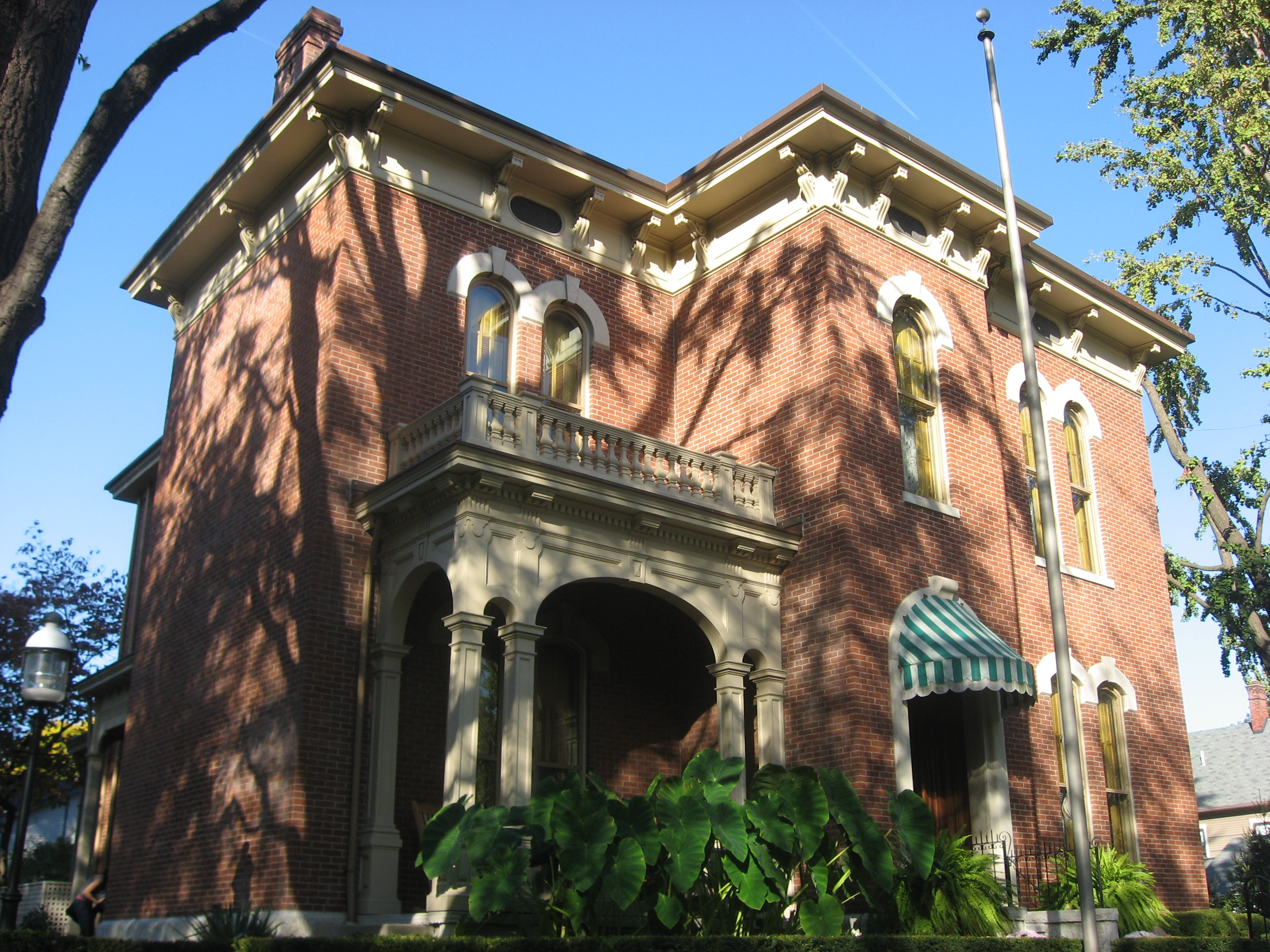

- Location within Indianapolis Location within Indiana Location within the United States
- Location: 528 Lockerbie Street, Indianapolis, Indiana
- Coordinates: 39°46′19″N 86°8′52″W
- Area: 1 acre (0.40 ha)
- Built: 1872
- Architectural style: Late Victorian
- Visitation: 5,101
- Part of: Lockerbie Square Historic District (ID73000038)
- NRHP reference No.: 66000799

Significant dates
- Added to NRHP: October 15, 1966
- Designated NHL: December 29, 1962
- Designated CP: February 23, 1973

The James Whitcomb Riley Museum Home, one of two homes known as the James Whitcomb Riley House on the National Register of Historic Places, is a historic building in the Lockerbie Square Historic District of Indianapolis, Indiana. It was named a National Historic Landmark in 1962 for its association with poet James Whitcomb Riley (1849–1916), known as the "Hoosier poet".

== History ==
An Indianapolis baker, John R. Nickum, had the building built in 1872. Nickum had the money to build the house as he had supplied the Union Army in Indianapolis with hardtack, a form of cracker despised by soldiers, during the Civil War. Nickum's daughter, Magdalena, and her husband Charles Holstein, a lawyer, would possess it when, in 1893, they invited noted poet James Whitcomb Riley to live with them. Riley had a bedroom on the second floor in this building for 23 years, helping the Holsteins with expenses.

After Riley and the Holsteins died, William Fortune bought it in 1916. He would later, presumably at the behest of Booth Tarkington, transfer ownership to the James Whitcomb Riley Memorial Association five years later. Due to so little time having passed from Riley's death to its preservation, most of the items of the household items of Riley's day, except for the kitchen, remain within the domicile.

Due to Riley's fame, it is the best known of the domiciles in the Lockerbie Square Historic District. The Riley Children's Foundation operates the museum. Noted items are the wicker chair which he frequently used after his stroke in 1911, and the bed on which he died on July 22, 1916.

== Architecture ==
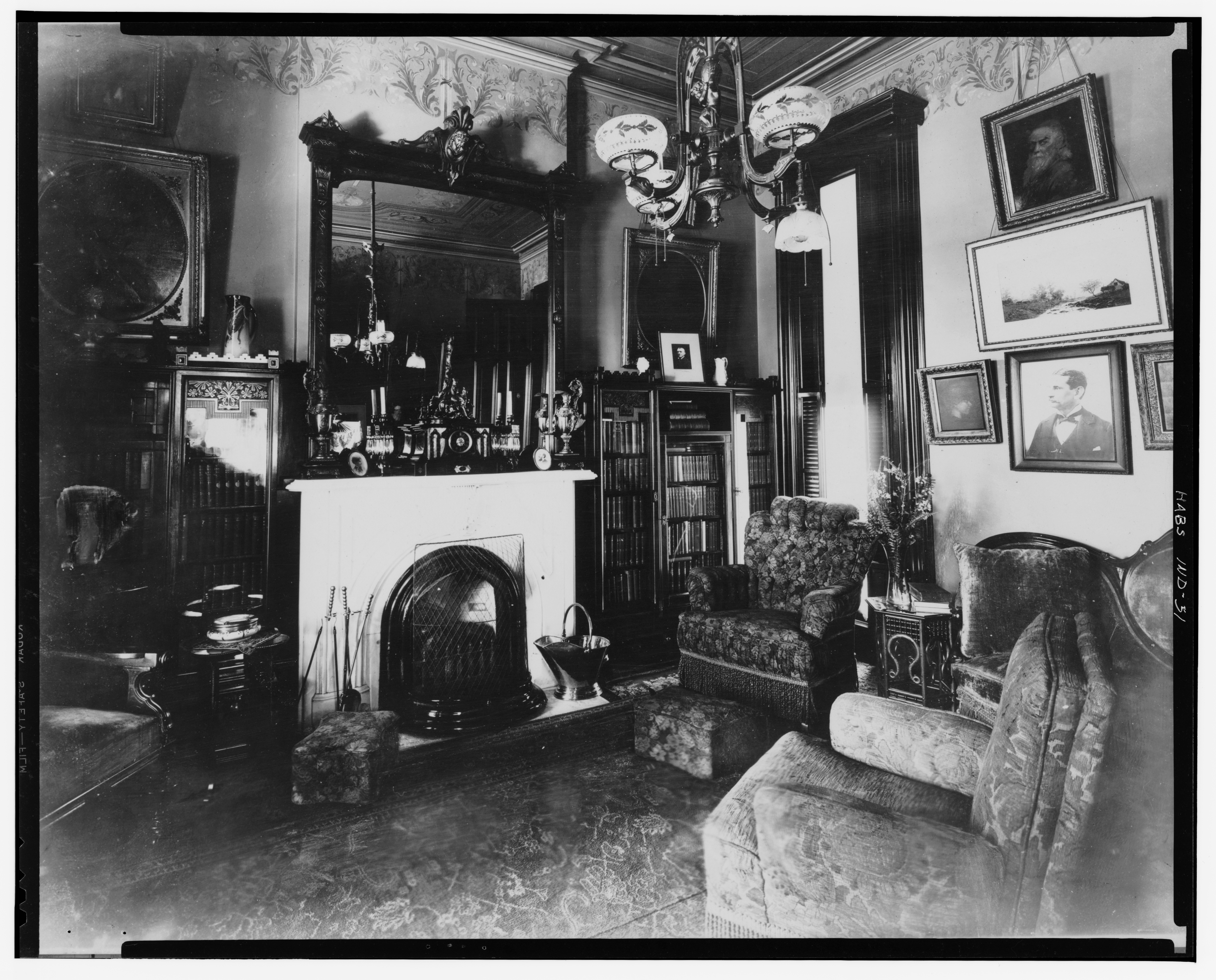
Library, showing the interior woodwork.

The structure is a two-story brick house on a stone foundation and full basement that is considered an excellent example of Italianate architecture typical of the neighborhood's homes built in the 1860s and 1870s. Slate shingles cover a roof which has wide overhanging eaves and decorated brackets, and is low-pitched hipped. Other features of the house are a central tower with oval-glazed paired doors, and masonry crowns atop tall narrow windows and inverted U-shaped windows on the highest floor. Water pumps took water from the well to tanks within the attic that could supply water to different rooms in the house. The interior woodwork is all hand-carved solid hardwoods. The lighting was originally fueled by gas, but is now powered by electricity. Speaking tubes were installed so that the staff could receive orders in the kitchen from other parts of the house.

== Gallery ==
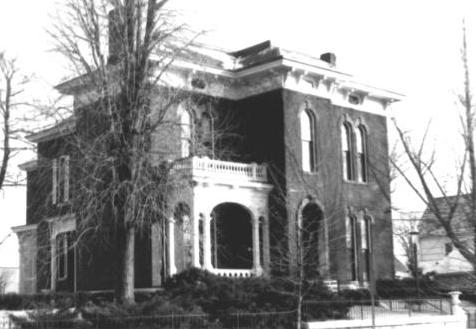
James Whitcomb Riley House in 1975

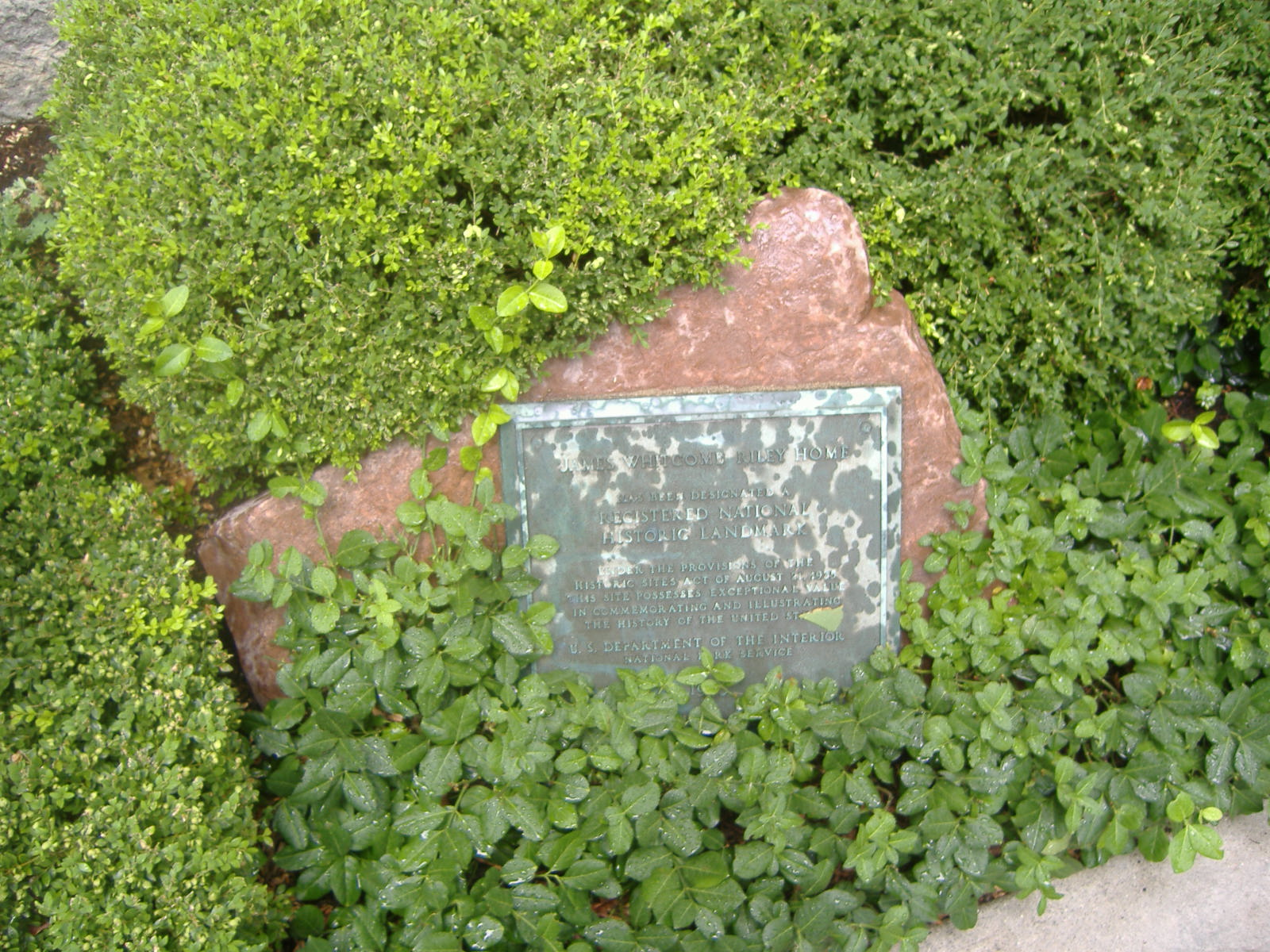
Marker denoting the home's NHL status

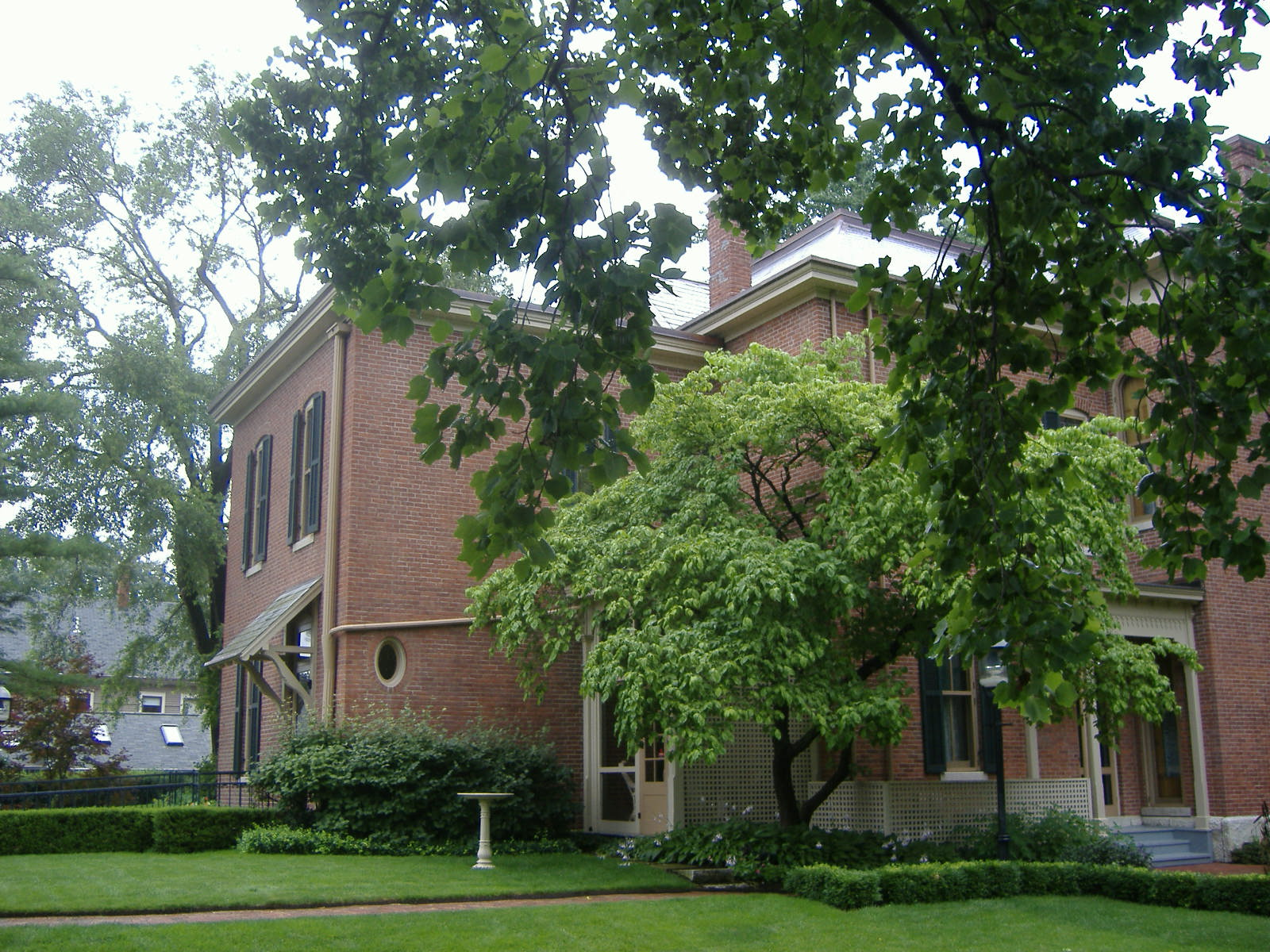
Rear of the House

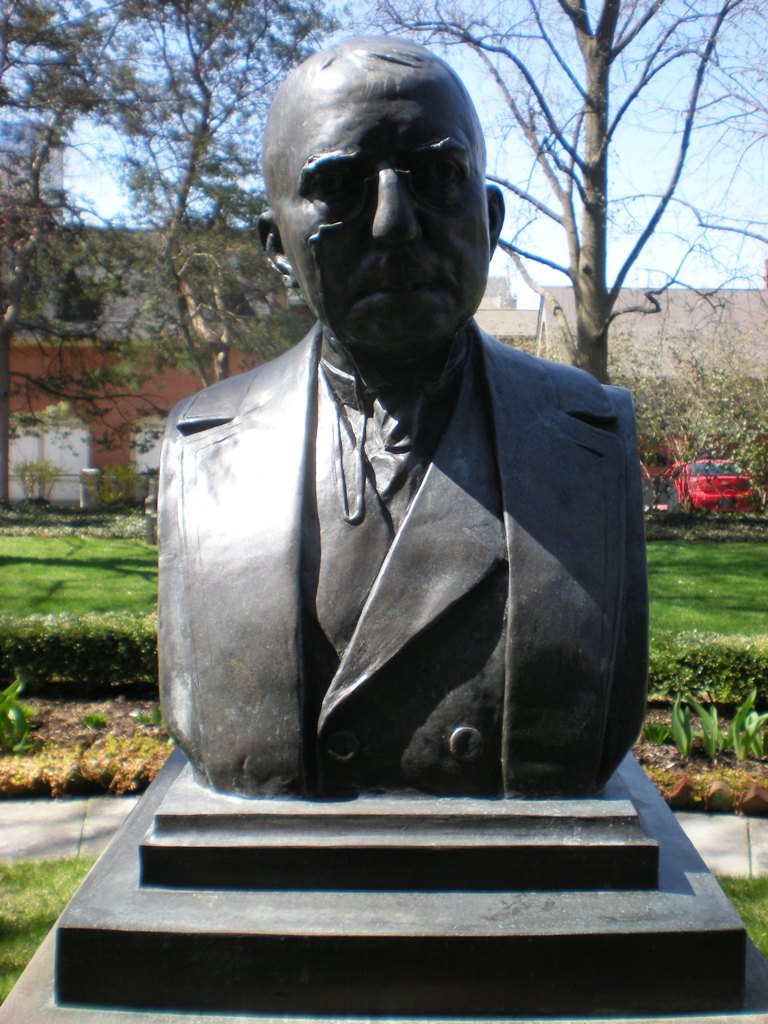
The bust by Myra Reynolds Richards 1916)

== See also ==
- Riley Birthplace and Museum
- List of attractions and events in Indianapolis
- List of museums in Indiana
- List of National Historic Landmarks in Indiana
- National Register of Historic Places listings in Center Township, Marion County, Indiana
