= Cole-Noble District =

Neighborhood in Indianapolis, Indiana, US

Coordinates: 39.7690°N 86.1480°W

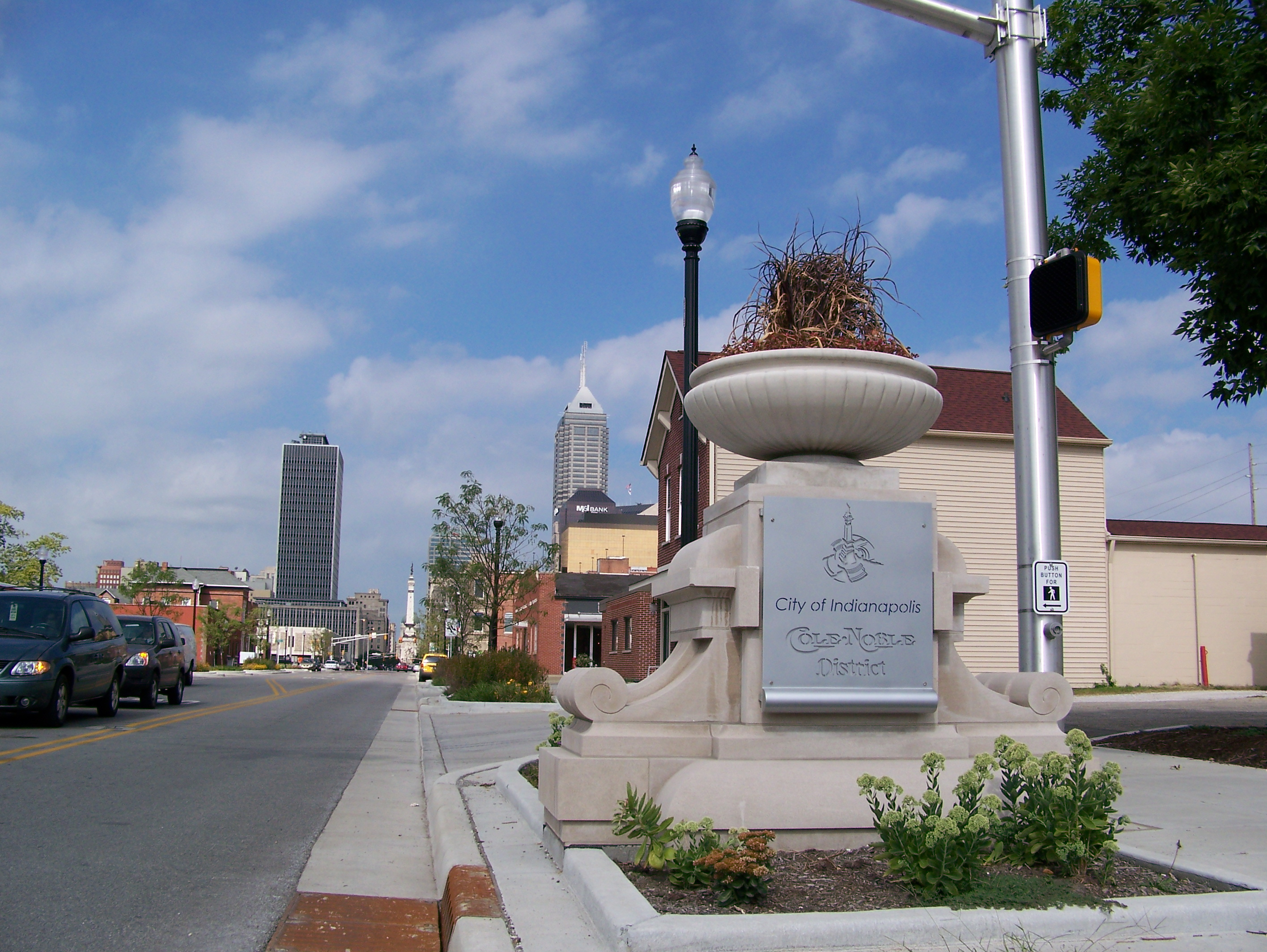
The Cole Noble District entrance

The Cole-Noble Commercial Arts District is a neighborhood in Indianapolis, Indiana, United States. It is situated on the east side of downtown Indianapolis.

== History ==
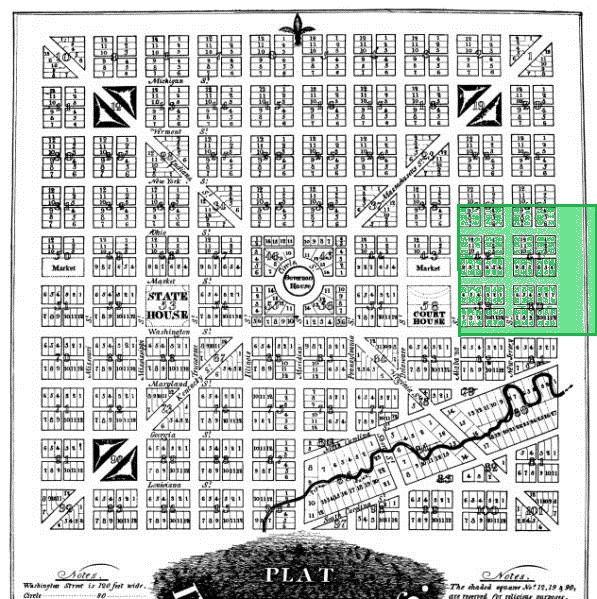
The Cole Noble District highlighted on the original Indianapolis plat

The name Cole-Noble Commercial Arts District derives from two pieces of Eastside Indianapolis history. The Cole Motor Car Company (1909–1925) was located on Washington Street just east of College Avenue. The company produced the first four-door automobile and competed with the prestigious Cadillac. Noble refers to Noah Noble, who served as Indiana governor from 1831 to 1839. The Noble family farm once occupied a significant portion of the Cole-Noble area.

The Cole Noble Commercial Arts District is known for a mix of Georgian, Federal, and Art Deco style architecture.

From 1974 to 2001, Market Square Arena was located at 300 East Market Street within the district. The indoor arena served as the home to the Indiana Pacers for 25 years, as well as numerous other entertainment events, before it was demolished in 2001. It is also known for being the site of Elvis Presley's last concert in 1977.

== Residential ==
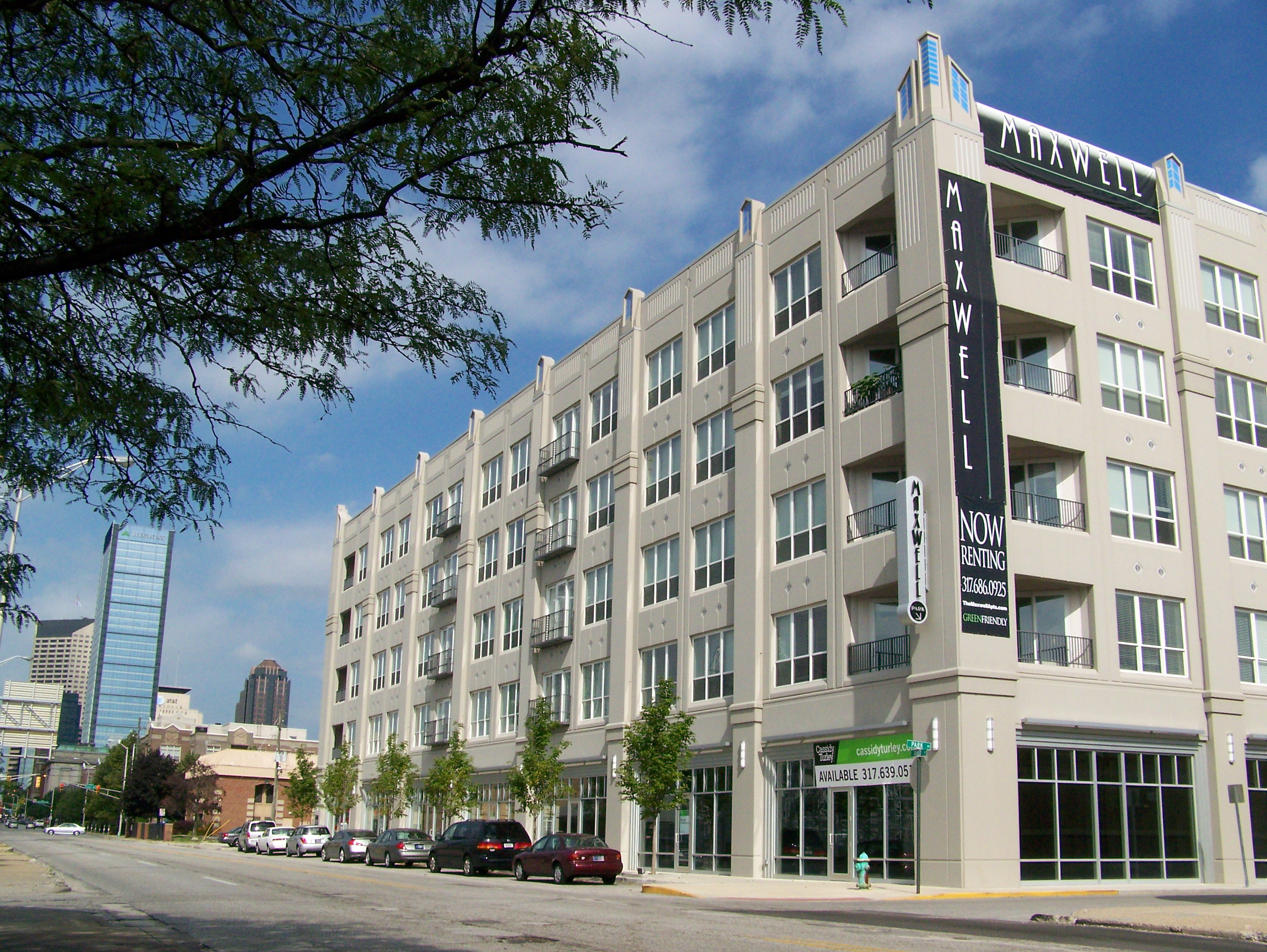
The Maxwell Apartments are built in the Art Deco style of architecture

Since 2003, more than a handful of residential developments have been constructed in the neighborhood. Multi-family environments including townhouses, condominiums, and apartments have helped to revitalize the neighborhood. Individual communities include the Hudson, the Clevelander, the Packard, the DeSoto, and the Maxwell. The 28-story apartment complex 360 Market Square was completed in mid-2018 on the northern half of the Market Square Arena site.

== Business ==
Several local businesses are headquartered in the Cole Noble District. Among them are the restaurant Indiana Nature Conservancy, Axis Architects, RJE Business Furniture, IT service provider RPM Technologies, and developer Milhaus. Sun King Brewery, and Easley Winery are also located in the Cole-Noble District.

== Borders of the District ==
- Northern – Miami Street
- Western – Alabama Street
- Southern – Railroad tracks south of Washington Street
- Eastern – I-65
