= Transportation in Indianapolis =

Transportation in Indianapolis

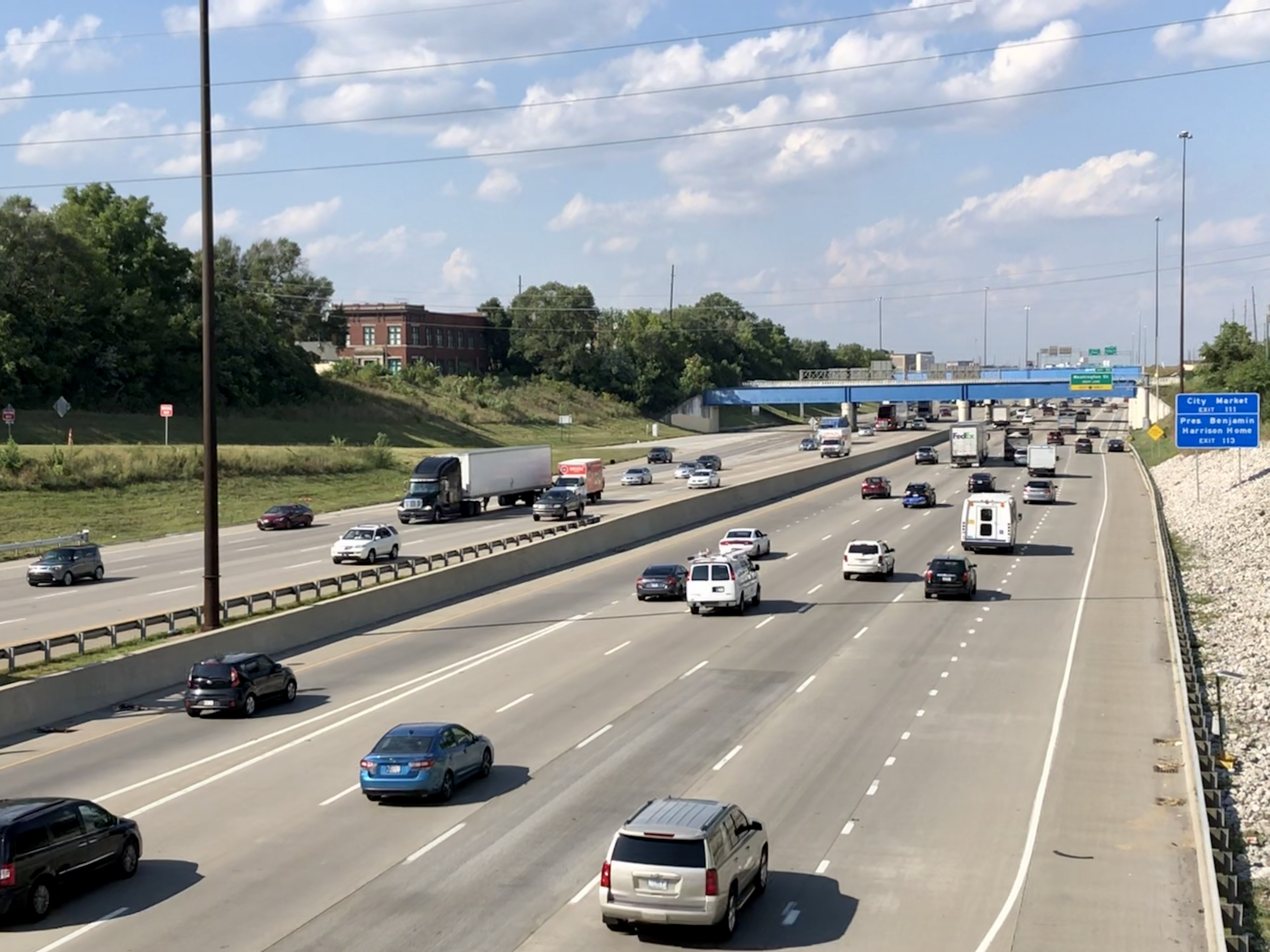
I-65/I-70

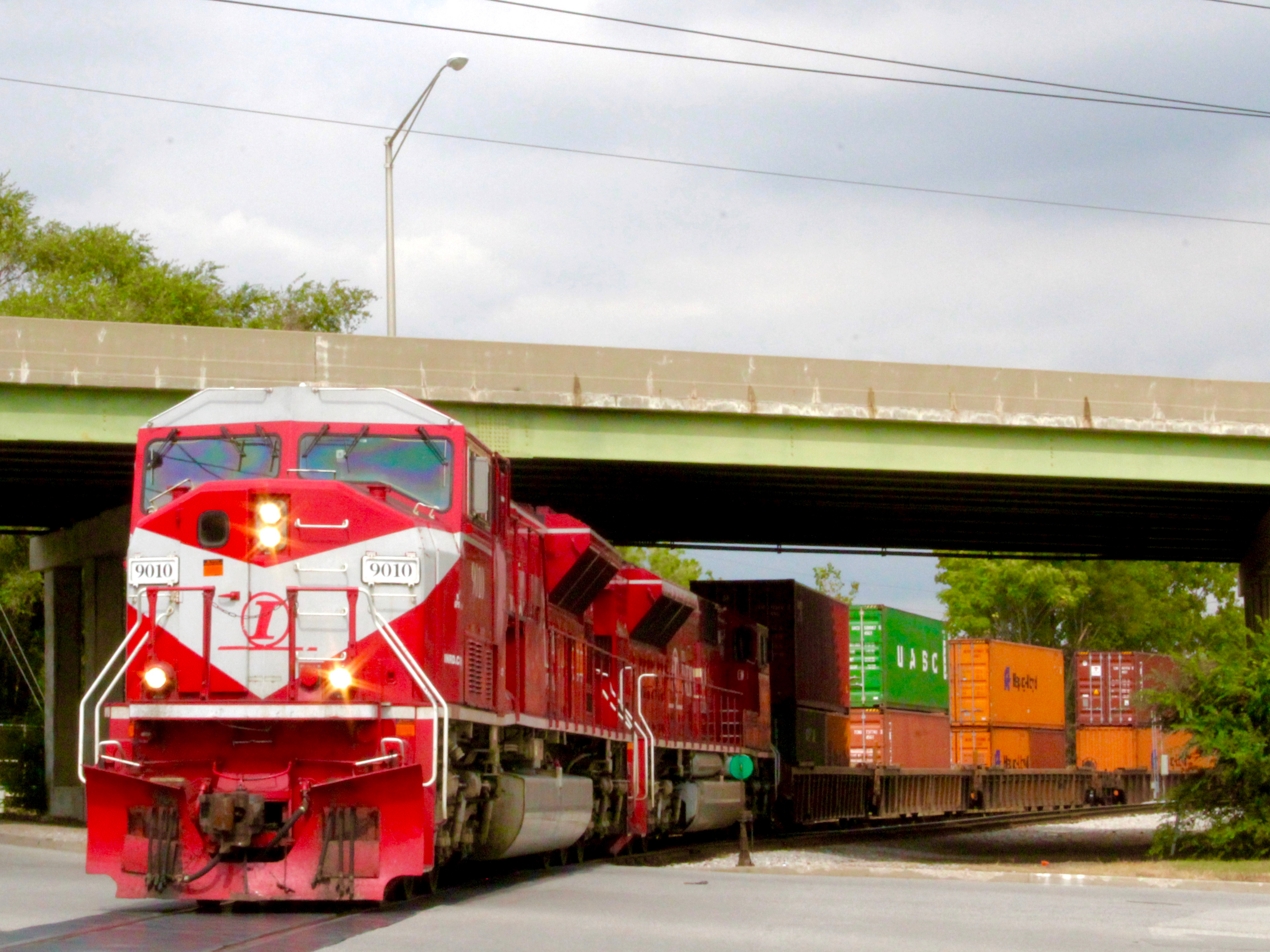
Indiana Rail Road

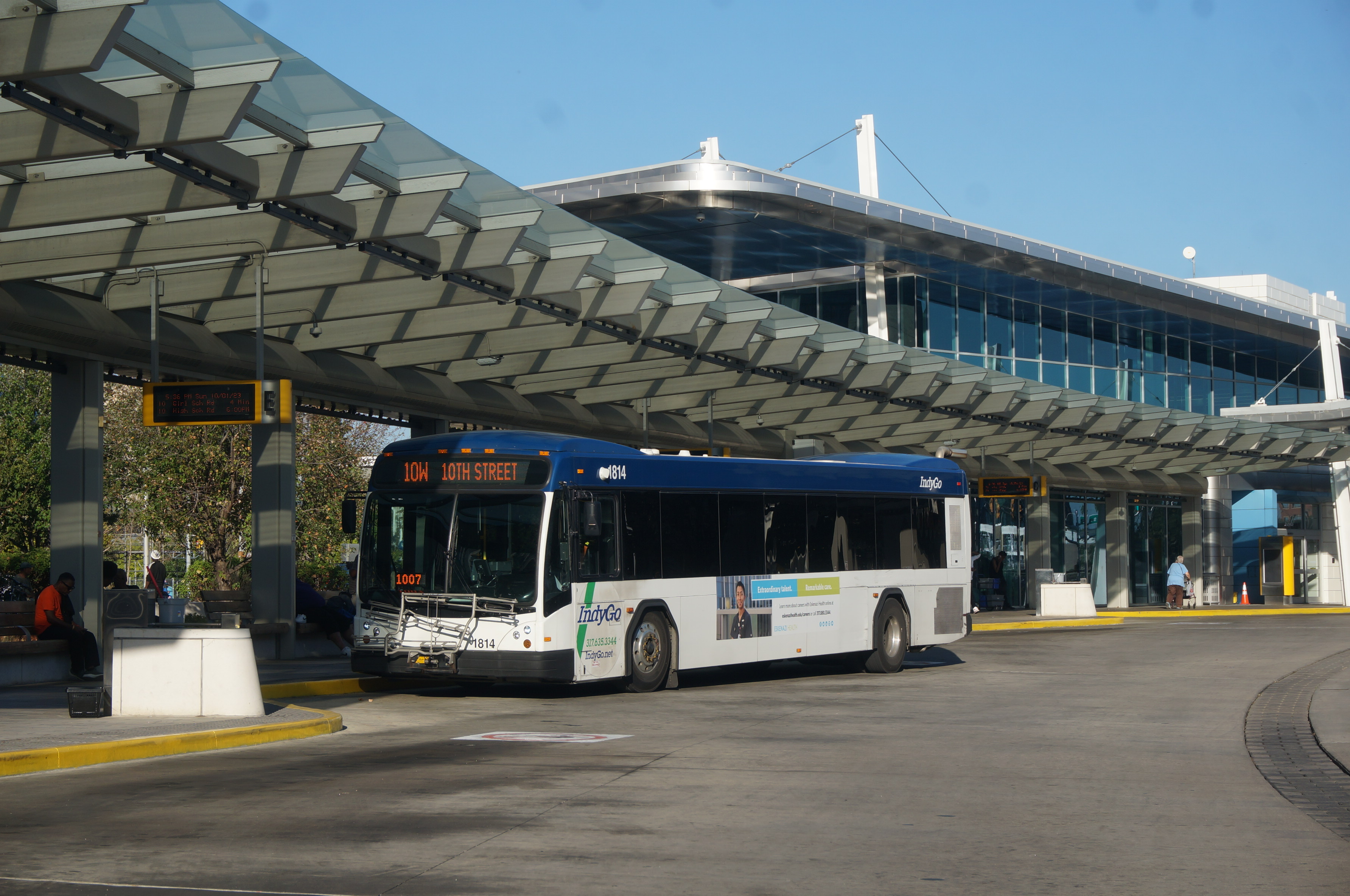
Julia M. Carson Transit Center

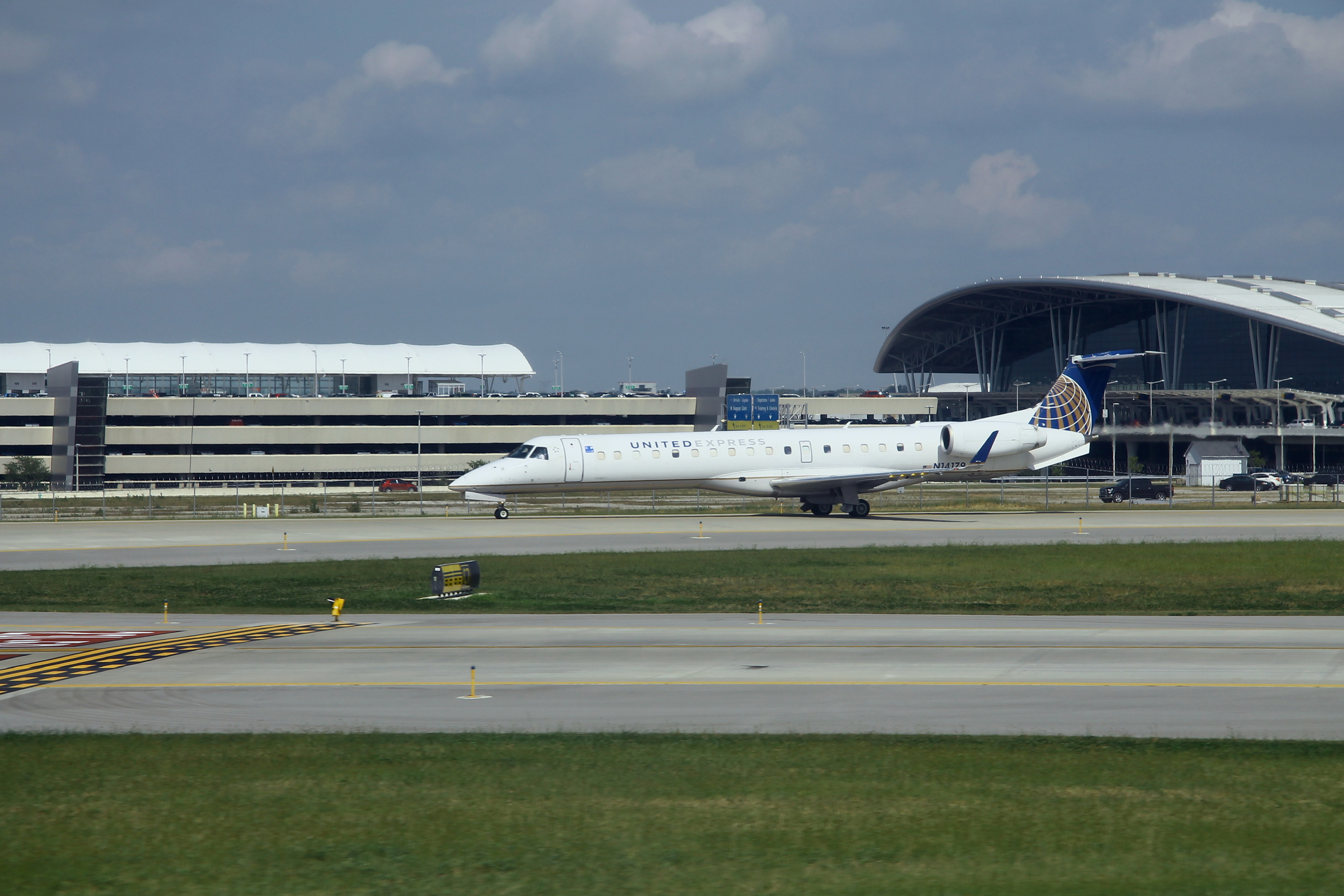
Indianapolis International Airport

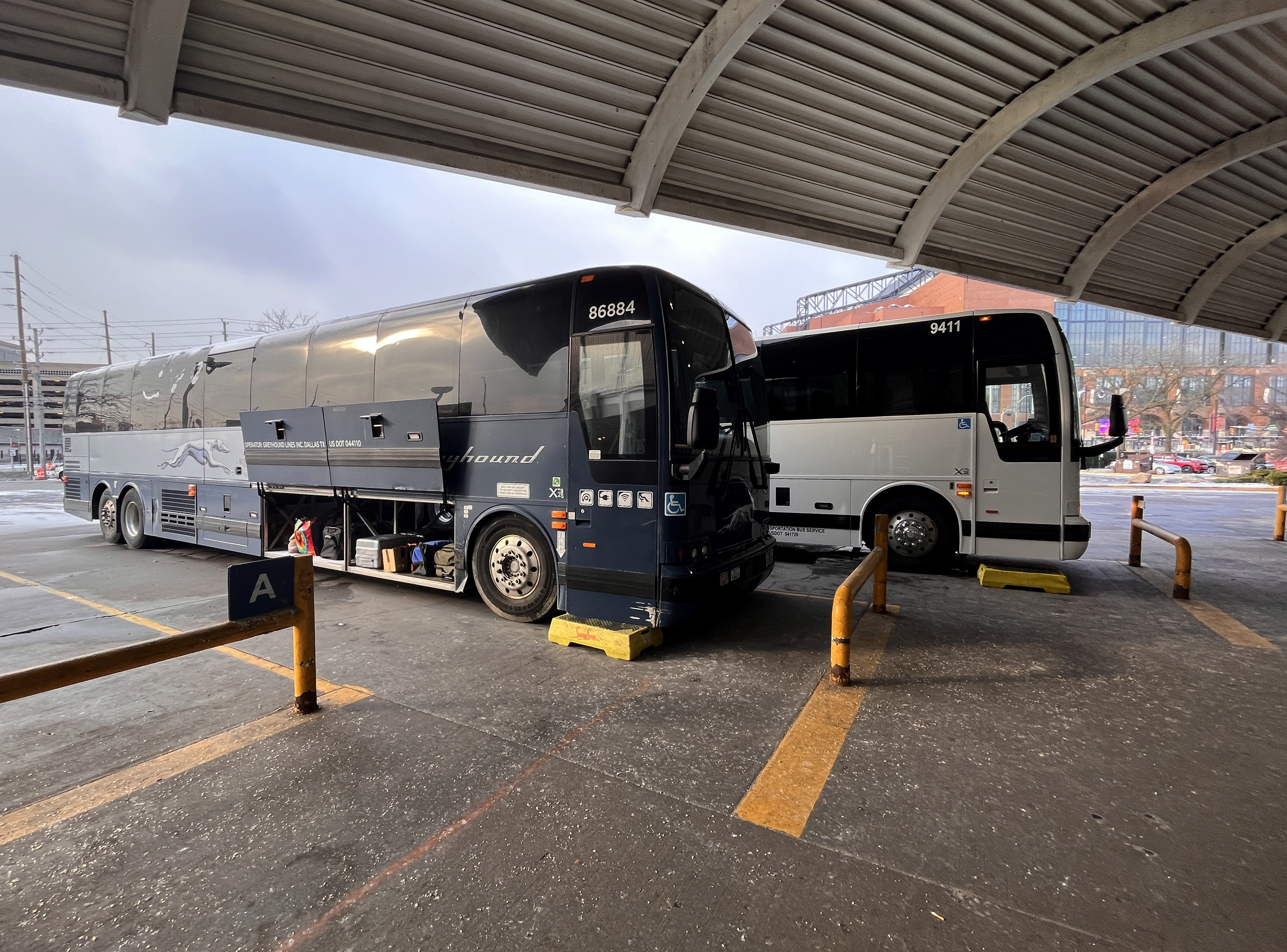
Indianapolis Union Station

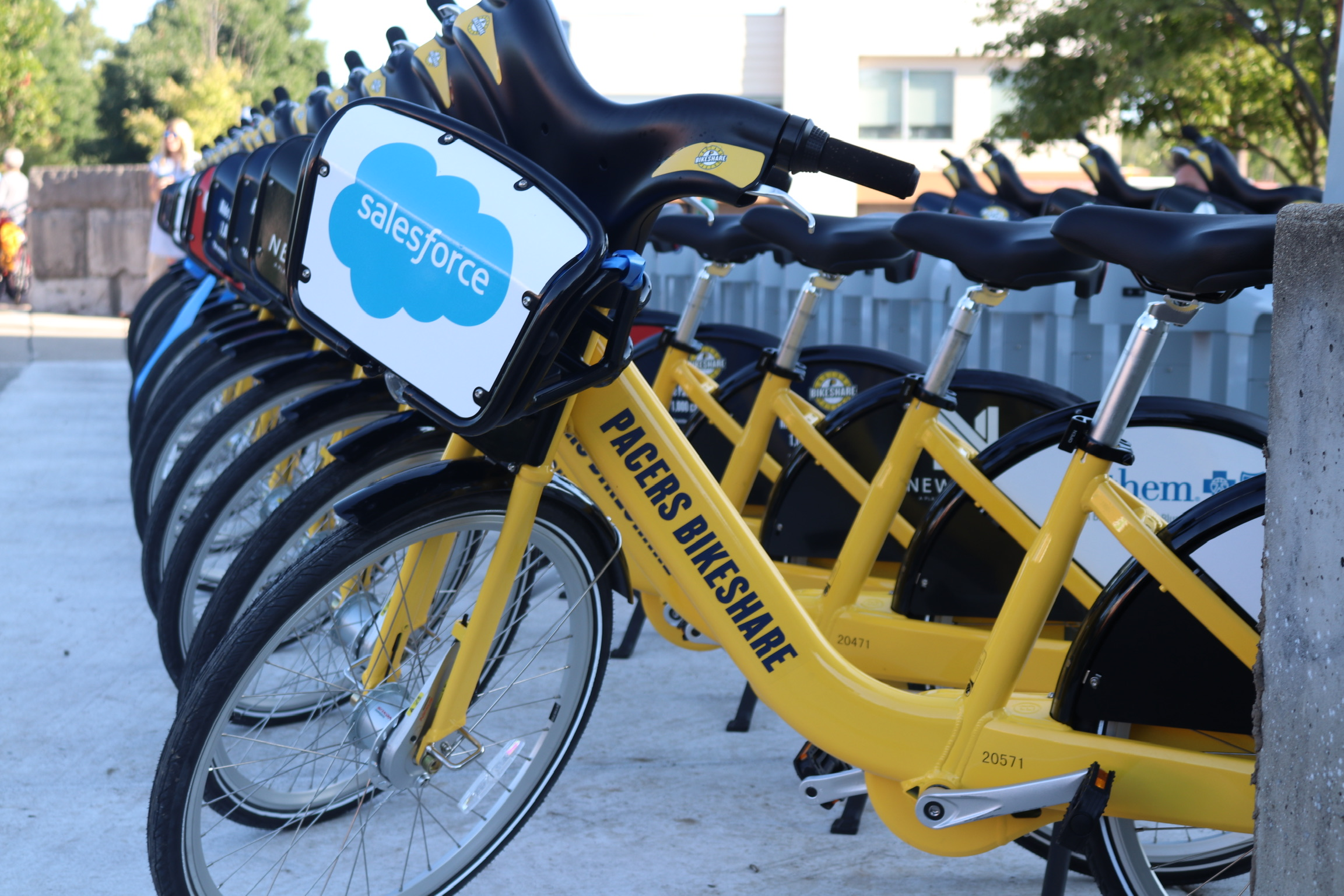
Indiana Pacers Bikeshare

Transportation in Indianapolis consists of a complex network that includes a local public bus system, several private intercity bus providers, Amtrak passenger rail service, four freight rail lines, an Interstate Highway System, an airport, a heliport, bikeshare system, 115 miles (185 km) of bike lanes, and 116 miles (187 km) of trails and greenways. The city has also become known for its prevalence of electric scooters.

== History ==
The prospects of river navigation coupled with a site near the center of the state were largely responsible for the location of Indianapolis. However, the White River proved too shallow for commercial shipping. After the steamboat Robert Hanna ran aground along the river in 1831, no steamboat successfully returned to Indianapolis. Flatboats continued to transport goods along a portion of the river until new dams impeded their ability to navigate its waters.

In 1821, the Indiana General Assembly authorized the construction of ten state roads to connect Indianapolis with other population centers throughout the state. By 1836, the National Road had reached Indianapolis. The National Road was the first major improved highway in the county built by the federal government. Built between 1811 and 1837, the 620-mile (1,000 km) road extended east to Cumberland, Maryland, and west to Vandalia, Illinois. Michigan Road, which bisected the state from north to south, was completed in 1839. Michigan Road connected Indianapolis to the inland ports of Michigan City, Indiana, and Madison, Indiana, opening the city to maritime transport via Lake Michigan and the Ohio River.

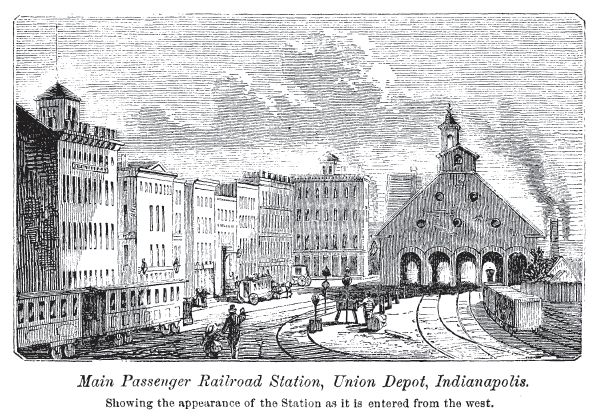
The city's first union depot (pictured) opened in 1853. Indianapolis Union Station opened on the site in 1888.

Two trains arrived in the city for the first time on October 1, 1847, to commemorate the completion of the Madison and Indianapolis Railroad. Within five years, seven rail lines converged in the city, including the Indianapolis and Bellefontaine Railroad, the Terre Haute and Richmond Railroad, the Peru and Indianapolis Railroad, the Indianapolis and Cincinnati Railroad, and the Indianapolis and Lafayette Railroad companies. Indianapolis pioneered the union station concept, first conceived in 1848. In 1849, the city's competing railroad companies cooperated to form the Indianapolis Union Railway Company to oversee operations of the world's first union depot, completed on September 20, 1853.

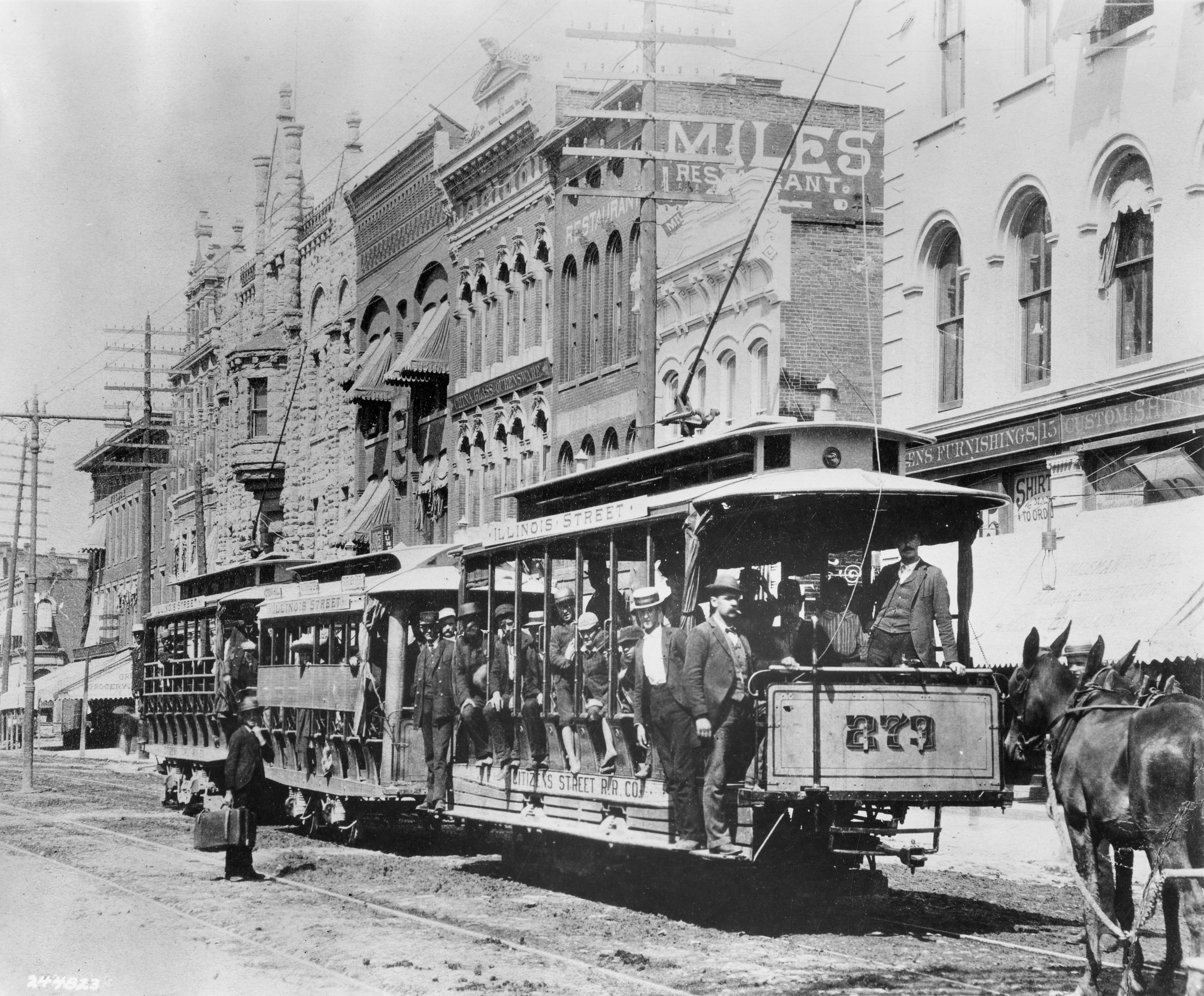
Electric streetcars on Illinois Street in 1896

Public transit arrived in Indianapolis on October 3, 1864, in the form of 12-seat mule-drawn streetcars which began operating between Union Station and Military Park. Citizens Street Railway Company managed several streetcar lines running on a hub-and-spoke system radiating from downtown Indianapolis to outlying neighborhoods. The first electric streetcar began operation on June 18, 1890, replacing the last of the mule-drawn streetcars in 1894. Electrification of the city's streetcar system dramatically improved efficiency and expediency, allowing residents to live further from the civic and business center of downtown. The development of several streetcar suburbs occurred during this time, including Irvington, Riverside, and Woodruff Place.

As the city and its rail traffic increased, the original union depot quickly became obsolete necessitating the construction of a larger union station in 1886. At the time of its opening in 1888, Indianapolis Union Station was servicing 80 passenger trains per day from 16 different railroad companies. In 1893, approximately 25,000 passengers rode an average of 120 passenger trains daily. By 1900, 150 trains were arriving daily. As the city's population grew and rail traffic increased, congestion at numerous level crossings became a major concern. Between 1905 and 1920, the city coordinated with the railroads to elevate tracks.

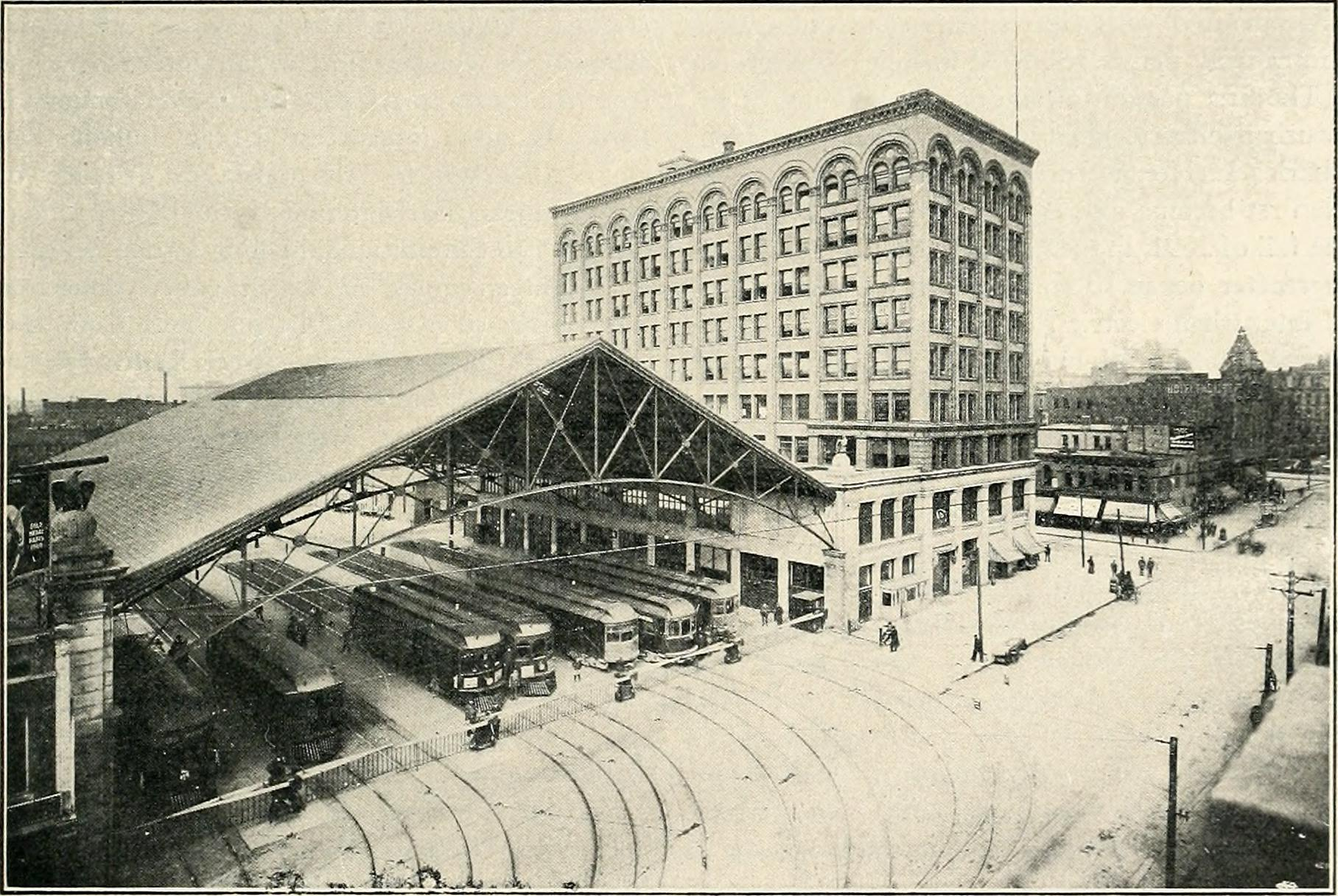
Indianapolis Traction Terminal in 1915; interurban service ended in 1941.

On January 1, 1900, the first interurban arrived in Indianapolis from Greenwood, Indiana. To accommodate the growing popularity of interurban travel, the Indianapolis Traction Terminal opened in September 1904, serving all but one of the 13 interurban lines converging in the city. As the busiest interurban station in the world, the Indianapolis Traction Terminal was the hub for Indiana's extensive 1,825-mile (2,937 km) interurban system. According to the Encyclopedia of Indianapolis, at the height of ridership, the terminal served more than 600 trains daily and seven million passengers annually. As automobiles became increasingly prevalent, the interurban's popularity waned. The terminal served its last interurban in September 1941.

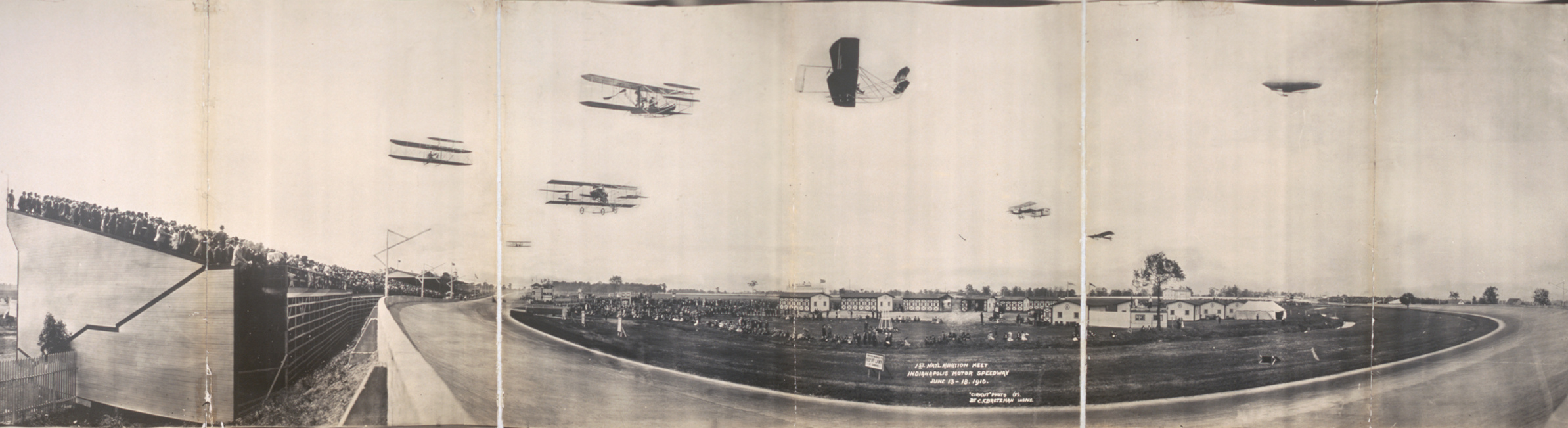
Indianapolis Motor Speedway hosted the first licensed aviation meet in the U.S. in 1910.

Some of the first aircraft to take flight in the city occurred at the Indianapolis Motor Speedway during the first licensed aviation meet in the U.S. and first public demonstration of airplanes in Indiana, from June 13–18, 1910. Several aviators, including Orville and Wilbur Wright, participated in the event which drew thousands of spectators. As aviation technology improved, it wasn't until the 1920s that several airfields opened throughout Indianapolis. The city's first public landing strip opened in July 1920 under the auspices of the Indianapolis Aerial Association; however, the strip was short-lived. Successive airfields included Crawford Field (1922), Schoen Field (1922), Cox Field (later renamed Stout Field) (1926), Hoosier Airport (1927), and Capitol Airways Airport (1928). Cox Field was the city's first municipal airport, serving as the site of Indianapolis's first regularly scheduled commercial flight, on December 17, 1927. Indianapolis Municipal Airport was dedicated on September 25, 1931, on the present-day site of Indianapolis International Airport, about 2 miles (3.2 km) west of Cox Field. On March 28, 1944, the airport was renamed Weir Cook Municipal Airport, commemorating Harvey Weir Cook.

Like most American cities following World War II, Indianapolis's electric streetcar ridership declined as personal automobile ownership increased. In 1952, more than 400 public transit vehicles traveled more than 43,000 miles (69,000 km) daily, providing 72 million passenger trips annually. The city's last streetcar was decommissioned in January 1953, replaced by trackless trolleys and motor buses.

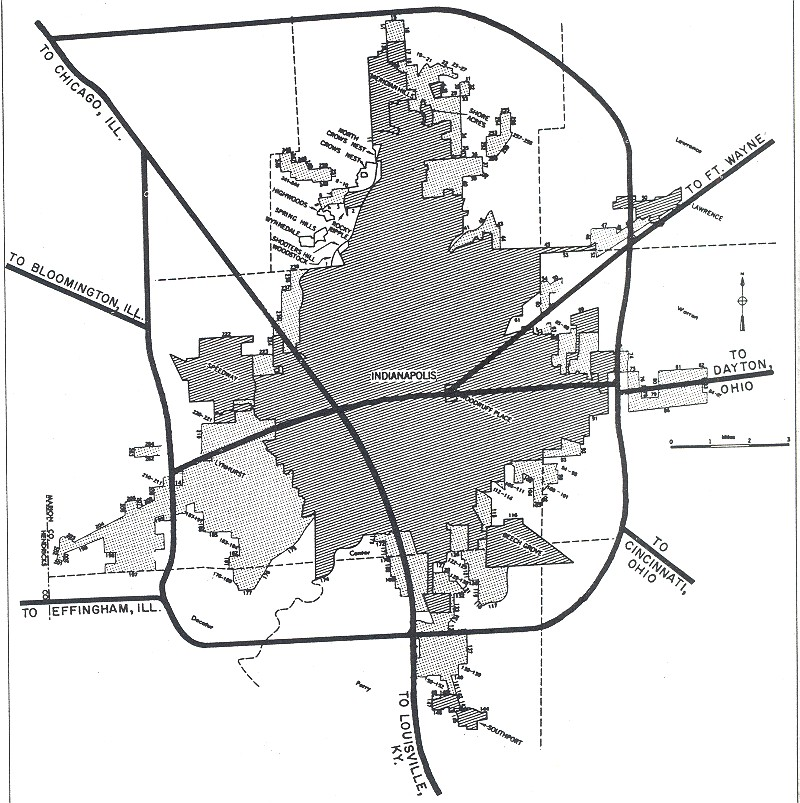
Bureau of Public Roads (precursor to the Federal Highway Administration) 1955 map of proposed Interstate Highway System routes in Indianapolis

With the passage of the Federal Aid Highway Act of 1956, major construction of the Interstate Highway System began locally in 1959 on the Interstate 465 beltway. The beltway was completed on October 5, 1970. Segments of Interstates 65, 69, 70, and 74 in Indianapolis were largely completed by the mid-1970s. Interstate 165 is the only planned Interstate highway never built in the city. I-165 was originally planned as a 2.7-mile-long (4.3 km) spur route between I-65 and 38th Street on the near northside of Indianapolis. The highway was withdrawn from the Interstate System on July 30, 1981.

In 1961, the Indiana General Assembly approved legislation allowing for the creation of a local administrative body to oversee air transportation throughout the region. In 1962, the Indianapolis Airport Authority was established as a municipal corporation of the City of Indianapolis to serve this role. Numerous expansions have occurred since Indianapolis International Airport opened in 1931, the most recent completed in 2008 at a cost of US$1.1 billion. The 1.2-million-square-foot (110,000 m2) midfield Colonel H. Weir Cook Terminal opened on November 11, 2008. Completion of the terminal was preceded by a new FAA Air Traffic Control Tower and Terminal Radar Approach Control building in April 2006.

Indianapolis was home to the first electric carsharing service in the U.S., Bolloré Bluecar's BlueIndy. Operations launched in September 2015 and ceased in May 2020. At the height of service, BlueIndy provided 200 electric cars and 92 charging stations throughout the city.

== Intercity ==
Intercity transportation infrastructure in the Indianapolis metropolitan area is a multifaceted network that includes an international airport, nine general aviation facilities, several private bus carriers, Amtrak passenger rail service, and four freight rail lines. The region's four primary and two auxiliary freeways are part of the Interstate Highway System.

=== Airports ===
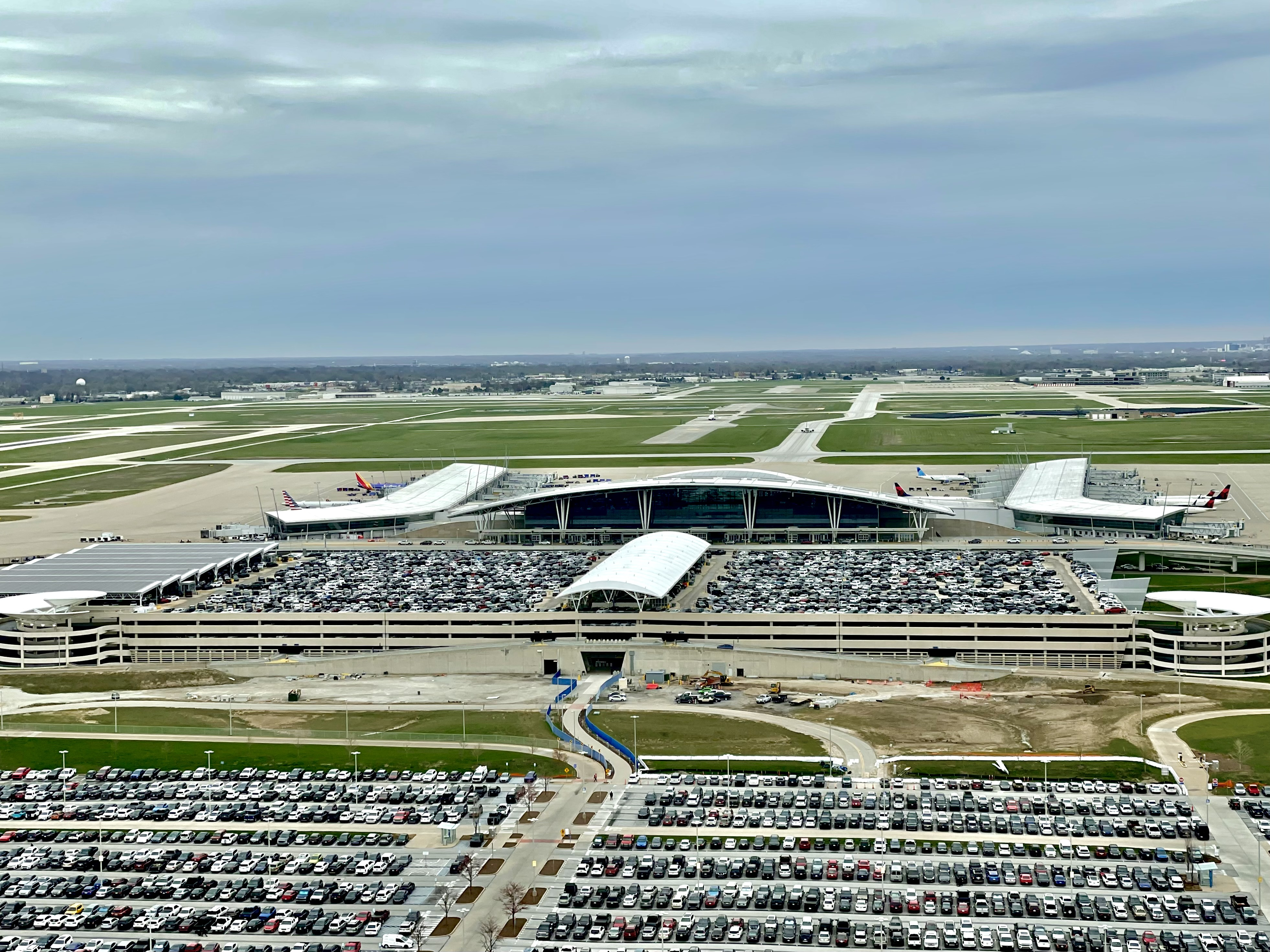
Indianapolis International Airport terminal and parking facilities, viewed from FAA control tower in April 2025

Indianapolis International Airport is the region's primary commercial airport. In 2021, the airport served 7.1 million passengers, handled 1.3 million metric tons of cargo, and saw nearly 186,000 aircraft operations. The Federal Aviation Administration (FAA) National Plan of Integrated Airport Systems for 2017–2021 categorized it as a medium hub primary commercial service facility. The airport is home to the Indianapolis Air Route Traffic Control Center (ZID), one of 22 established FAA air route traffic control centers in the U.S.

The airport is owned and operated by the Indianapolis Airport Authority, a municipal corporation. The airport completed a new air traffic control tower in 2006 and terminal in 2008. Col. H. Weir Cook Terminal contains two concourses and 40 gates, connecting to 51 nonstop domestic and international destinations and averaging 145 daily departures. The airport is a major international cargo hub, home to significant operations for FedEx Express. It ranks among the ten busiest airports in terms of cargo throughput in the U.S.

The Indianapolis Airport Authority owns and operates an additional five aviation facilities in the city and surrounding counties:

- Eagle Creek Airpark (Indianapolis)
- Hendricks County Airport (Danville)
- Indianapolis Downtown Heliport
- Indianapolis Metropolitan Airport (Fishers)
- Indianapolis Regional Airport (Greenfield)

Four other publicly owned general aviation airports are located elsewhere in the Indianapolis metropolitan area:

- Anderson Municipal Airport (Anderson)
- Indianapolis Executive Airport (Zionsville)
- Indy South Greenwood Airport (Greenwood)
- Shelbyville Municipal Airport (Shelbyville)

=== Bus ===
Intercity bus service to Indianapolis is provided by Barons Bus Lines, Burlington Trailways, FlixBus, Greyhound Lines, and Miller Transportation, among other private carriers. In 2021, Indianapolis Union Station was the state's primary intercity bus transfer hub, served by seven carriers operating 12 routes.

=== Rail ===
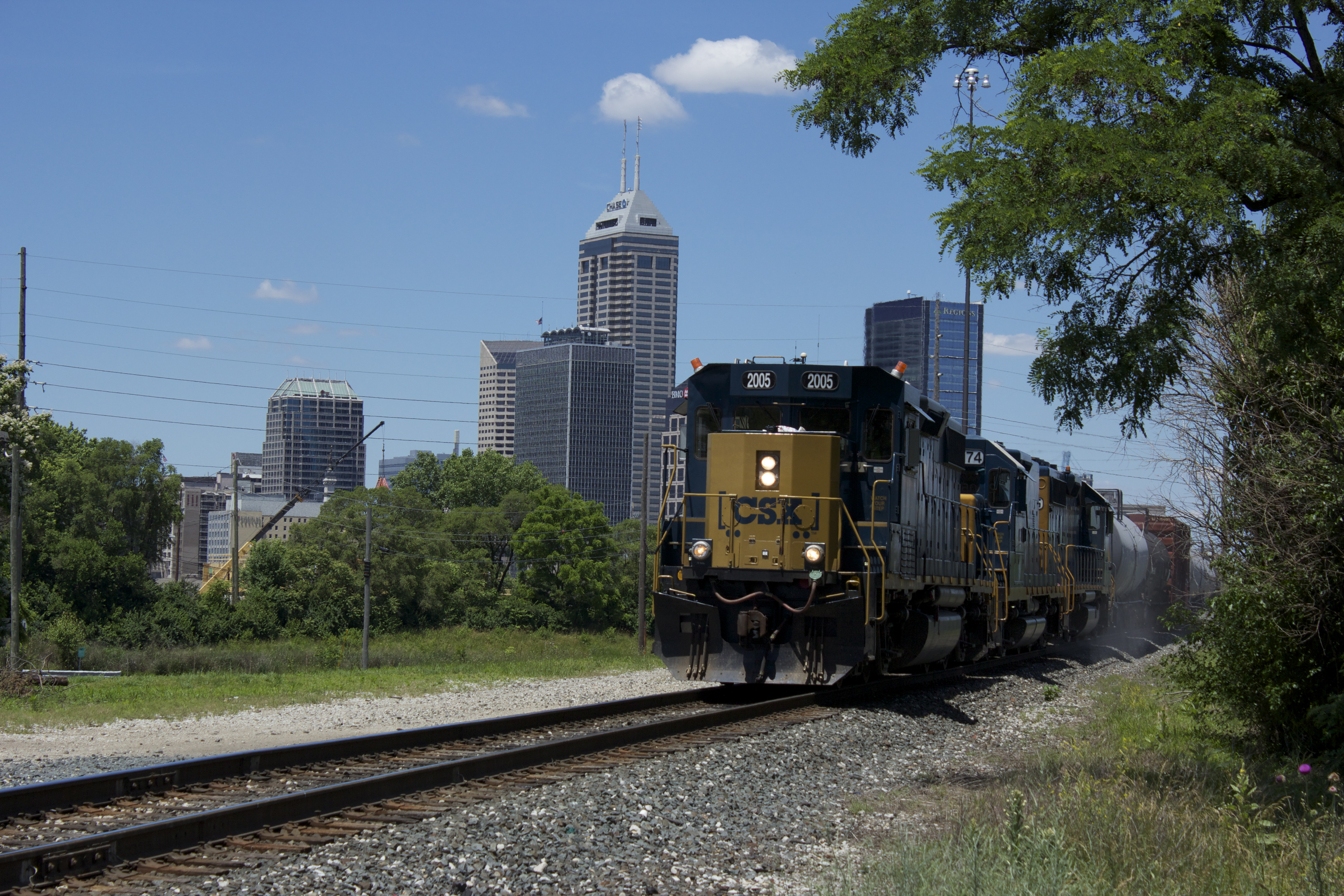
CSX freight train near downtown Indianapolis (2016)

Amtrak provides inter-city rail service to Indianapolis via Union Station, serving nearly 25,000 passengers in 2019. The Cardinal makes three weekly trips between New York City and Chicago. The Hoosier State provided service between Indianapolis and Chicago on days the Cardinal did not operate. The line was discontinued in 2019 after the Indiana General Assembly withdrew its funding from the state's budget.

Amtrak's Beech Grove Shops, in the enclave of Beech Grove, serve as its primary heavy maintenance and overhaul facility, while the Indianapolis Distribution Center is the company's largest material and supply terminal.

Advocates and state officials have identified the Indianapolis–Chicago and Indianapolis–Louisville corridors as priorities for future passenger rail investments. Amtrak's 2021 Connects US plan identified proposed new routes and service frequencies, including eight daily round trips between Indianapolis and Chicago, and four each between Indianapolis, Louisville, and Cincinnati. The plan also proposes a new train station at Indianapolis International Airport.

Freight rail lines converging in the city include one Class I railroad (CSX Transportation), one Class II railroad (Indiana Rail Road Company), and two shortline railroads (Indiana Southern Railroad and Louisville and Indiana Railroad). Indianapolis is a hub for CSX Transportation, home to its division headquarters, an intermodal terminal, and classification yard in the suburb of Avon.

=== Highways ===
Map of current and former highways in Indianapolis before the extension of I-69 on the south side: ǁ Interstate ‖ U.S. Highway or Indiana State Road ‖ Decommissioned

The Indiana Department of Transportation (INDOT) manages all Interstates, U.S. Highways, and Indiana State Roads within Indianapolis. Among urbanized areas with 1,000,000 population or greater in the U.S., Indianapolis ranked tenth in freeway lane miles per 1,000 population and eighth in freeway-equivalent miles per 1,000 population, according to 1999 data.

According to transportation analytics firm INRIX, Indianapolis motorists averaged 24 hours stuck in traffic in 2022. This marked a 71% increase from 2021 but was still lower than congestion experienced in 2019 (prior to the COVID-19 pandemic).

==== Interstates ====
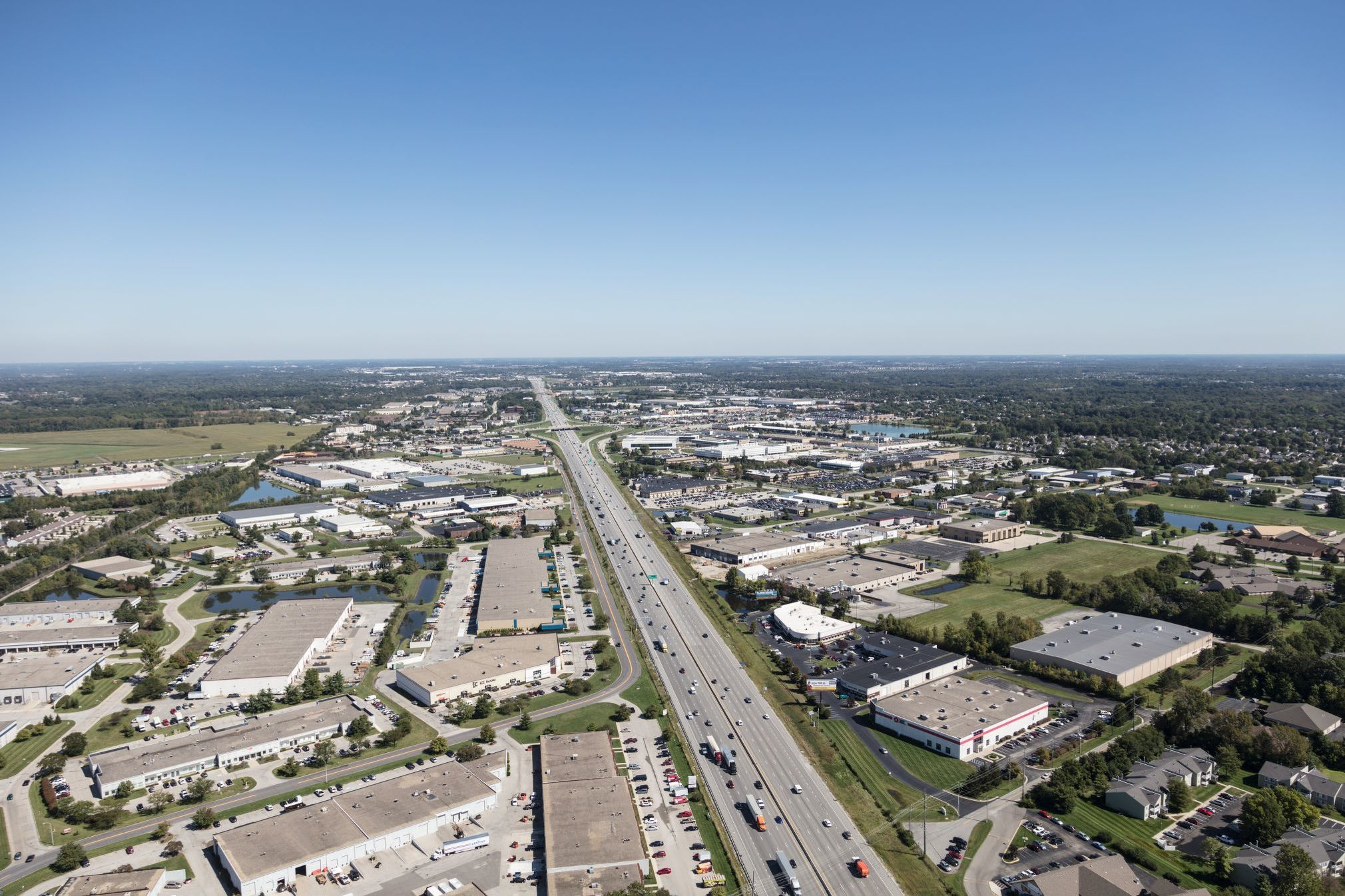
An aerial view of Interstate 69 in 2016, looking northeast from about 86th Street in Indianapolis.

The Indianapolis metropolitan area is served by four primary and two auxiliary freeways that are part of the Interstate Highway System. Interstate 465 (I-465) is a 53-mile (85 km) beltway that encircles Indianapolis, linking all Interstates in the city.

Among primary Interstates serving Indianapolis, Interstate 65 (I-65) and Interstate 70 (I-70) are the only two that bisect the city north–south and east–west. I-65 and I-70 meet near downtown Indianapolis, informally referred to as the "inner loop". The North Split interchange—where the two highways merge northeast of the central business district—is the second-busiest interchange in Indiana, with traffic counts of more than 200,000 vehicles per day. INDOT began a $350 million reconstruction of the interchange in 2021. Northbound I-65 terminates at Interstate 90 (Indiana Toll Road) in Gary, Indiana, while southbound I-65 reaches Louisville, Kentucky. Westbound I-70 reaches St. Louis, Missouri, while eastbound I-70 reaches Columbus, Ohio.

Two additional primary Interstates serve Indianapolis: Interstate 69 (I-69) and Interstate 74 (I-74). I-69 connects the state's largest cities, reaching Fort Wayne to the northeast and Evansville to the southwest. From Peoria, Illinois, I-74 converges with I-465 on the city's west side, runs concurrent with I-465, then diverges on the city's southeast side toward Cincinnati, Ohio. Interstate 865 (I-865) serves as a 4.7-mile (7.6 km) connector between I-65 and I-465, northwest of Indianapolis proper in Boone County.

==== U.S. Highways and state roads ====
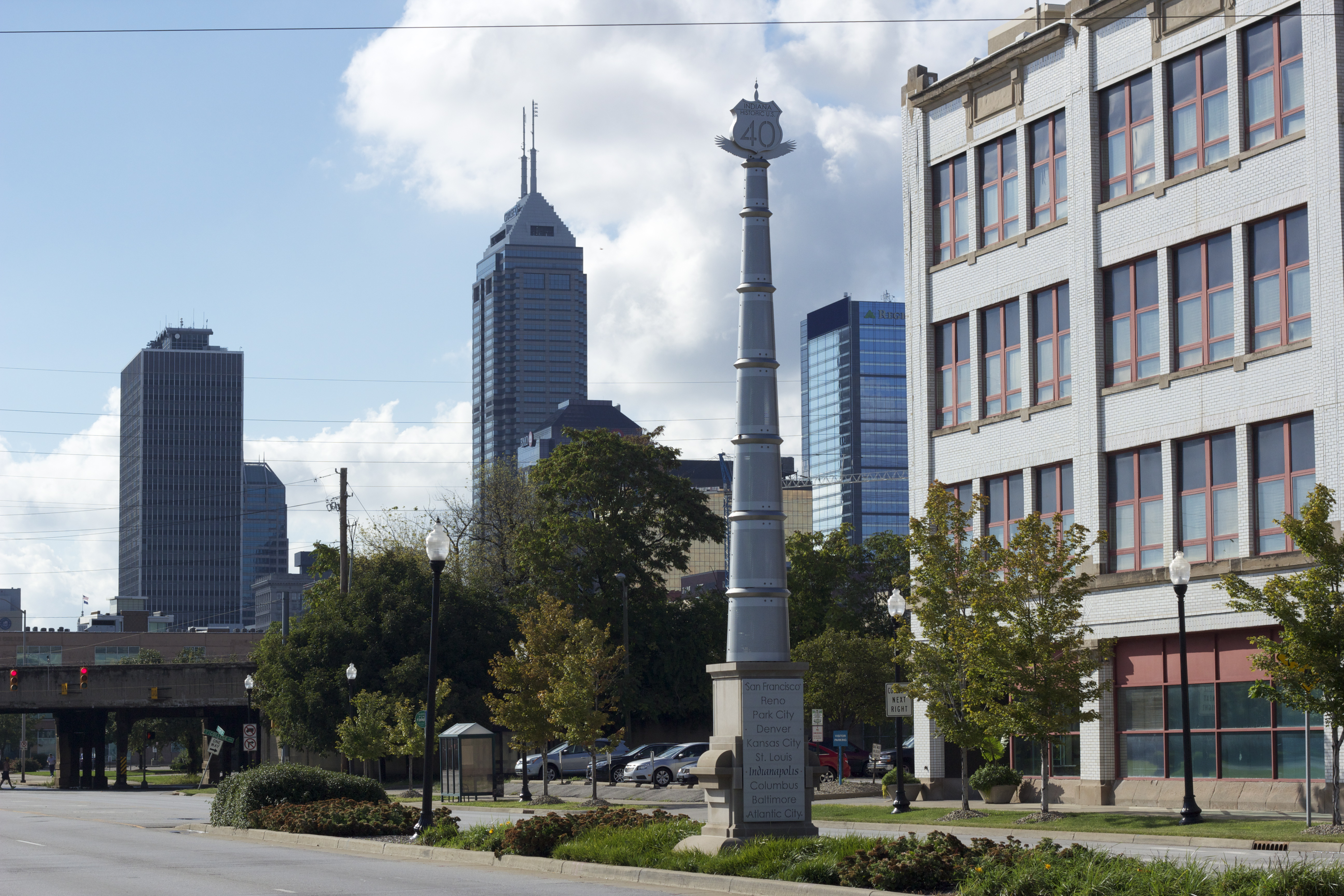
A monument to US 40 stands in the median of Washington Street in downtown Indianapolis (2016).

Indianapolis is served by six U.S. Highways, five of which share a concurrency with I-465, and four Indiana State Roads. Starting in 1967, INDOT began rerouting U.S. Highways and Indiana State Roads to the I-465 beltway to bypass local traffic. On July 1, 1999, INDOT completed decommissioning the remaining highway segments inside the beltway. The decommissioned roadways were relinquished to the Indianapolis Department of Public Works.

US 31 reaches South Bend, Indiana, to the north and Jeffersonville, Indiana, to the south. US 36 reaches Springfield, Illinois, to the west and Piqua, Ohio, to the east. US 40, the Historic National Road, reaches Terre Haute, Indiana, to the west and Richmond, Indiana, to the east. US 40 and its former alignment through urban Indianapolis is named Washington Street. US 52 reaches Lafayette, Indiana, to the northwest and Brookville, Indiana, to the southeast. US 136 reaches Danville, Illinois, to the west and terminates at I-465 on the city's west side near Speedway. US 421 reaches Michigan City, Indiana, to the north and Madison, Indiana, to the south.

State Road 37 reaches Tell City, Indiana, to the south and Marion, Indiana, to the north. State Road 67 (Kentucky Ave.) reaches Vincennes, Indiana, to the southwest and Portland, Indiana, to the northeast. State Road 134 is a 0.38-mile (0.61 km) segment of Girls School Rd. connecting the Indiana Women's Prison to US 136 on the city's west side. From its northern terminus at US 31 on the city's south side, State Road 135 (Meridian Street via Thompson Rd.) terminates near Mauckport, Indiana, at the Ohio River.

== Intracity ==
Intracity transportation infrastructure in Indianapolis consists of a local public bus system, a bicycle-sharing system, and a network of bike lanes, trails, and greenways. The city's Department of Public Works maintains about 8,175 miles (13,156 km) of street lane miles, in addition to alleys, sidewalks, curbs, and 540 bridges.

=== Skywalk system ===
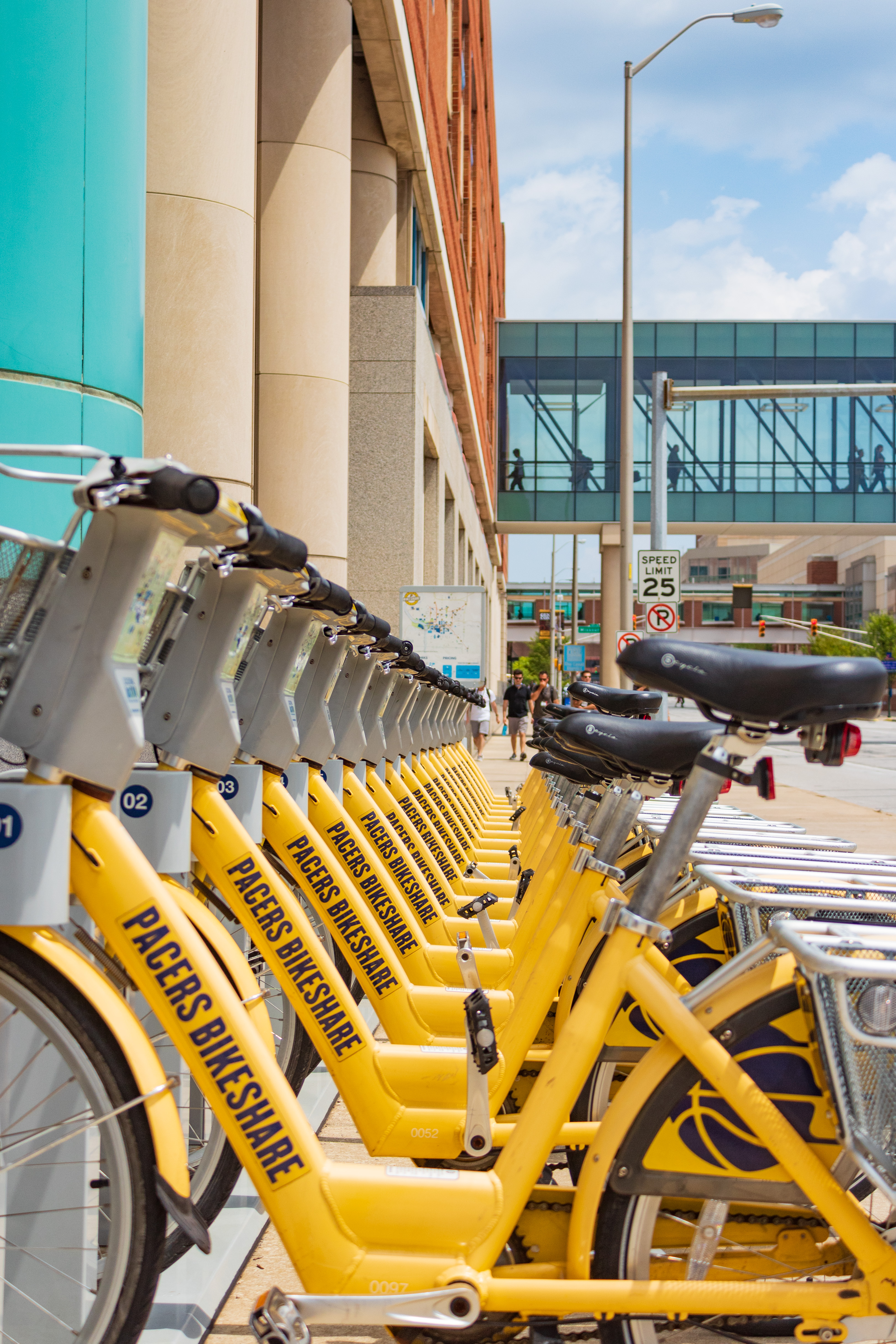
Skywalks span Maryland Street near a Pacers Bikeshare docking station in 2018

Downtown Indianapolis features a climate-controlled system of 14 public skywalks. Mainly catering to visitors, the skywalk system connects the Indiana Convention Center to 12 hotel properties representing more than 4,700 hotel rooms. A pedestrian tunnel beneath South Street connects the system with Lucas Oil Stadium.

=== Bicycling ===
In 2021, Indianapolis contained 115 miles (185 km) of bike lanes in addition to 116 miles (187 km) of trails and greenways. In recent years, officials have committed to increased funding for bicycling infrastructure upgrades and additions, including the city's first neighborways. Popular existing trails and greenways in the city include the Fall Creek Greenway, Indianapolis Cultural Trail, Pleasant Run Greenway, and Monon Trail. The latter is a rail trail and part of the United States Bicycle Route System (USBR 35).

Indiana Pacers Bikeshare debuted in 2014 as the city's public bicycle-sharing system, consisting of 525 bicycles and 50 docking stations. Stations are sited on or near the city's public trails and greenways.

Indianapolis is designated a "Bronze Level" Bicycle Friendly Community by the League of American Bicyclists.

=== Public transit ===
The Indianapolis Public Transportation Corporation, doing business as IndyGo, operates and manages the city's public bus system, including bus rapid transit, microtransit, and paratransit services. In 2020, IndyGo operated 31 fixed routes with a fleet of 212 buses, serving about 4.8 million passenger trips (compared with pre-COVID-19 pandemic ridership of 9.2 million in 2019).

The municipal corporation began operations in 1975 under the name Metro. The Julia M. Carson Transit Center opened in 2016 as the downtown transfer hub for 27 of its 31 bus routes.

In 2017, City-County Council approved a voter referendum increasing Marion County's income tax to help fund IndyGo's first major system expansion since its founding. Local taxes and federal grants will fund systemwide improvements, including the creation of three bus rapid transit lines, battery electric buses, sidewalks, bus shelters, extended hours and weekend schedules.

Established in 2007, the Central Indiana Regional Transportation Authority (CIRTA) is a quasi-governmental agency that organizes regional car and vanpools and operates three public workforce connectors from Indianapolis to employment centers in suburban Plainfield and Whitestown. CIRTA serves ten counties, including Boone, Delaware, Hamilton, Hancock, Hendricks, Johnson, Madison, Marion, Morgan, and Shelby.

==== Bus rapid transit ====
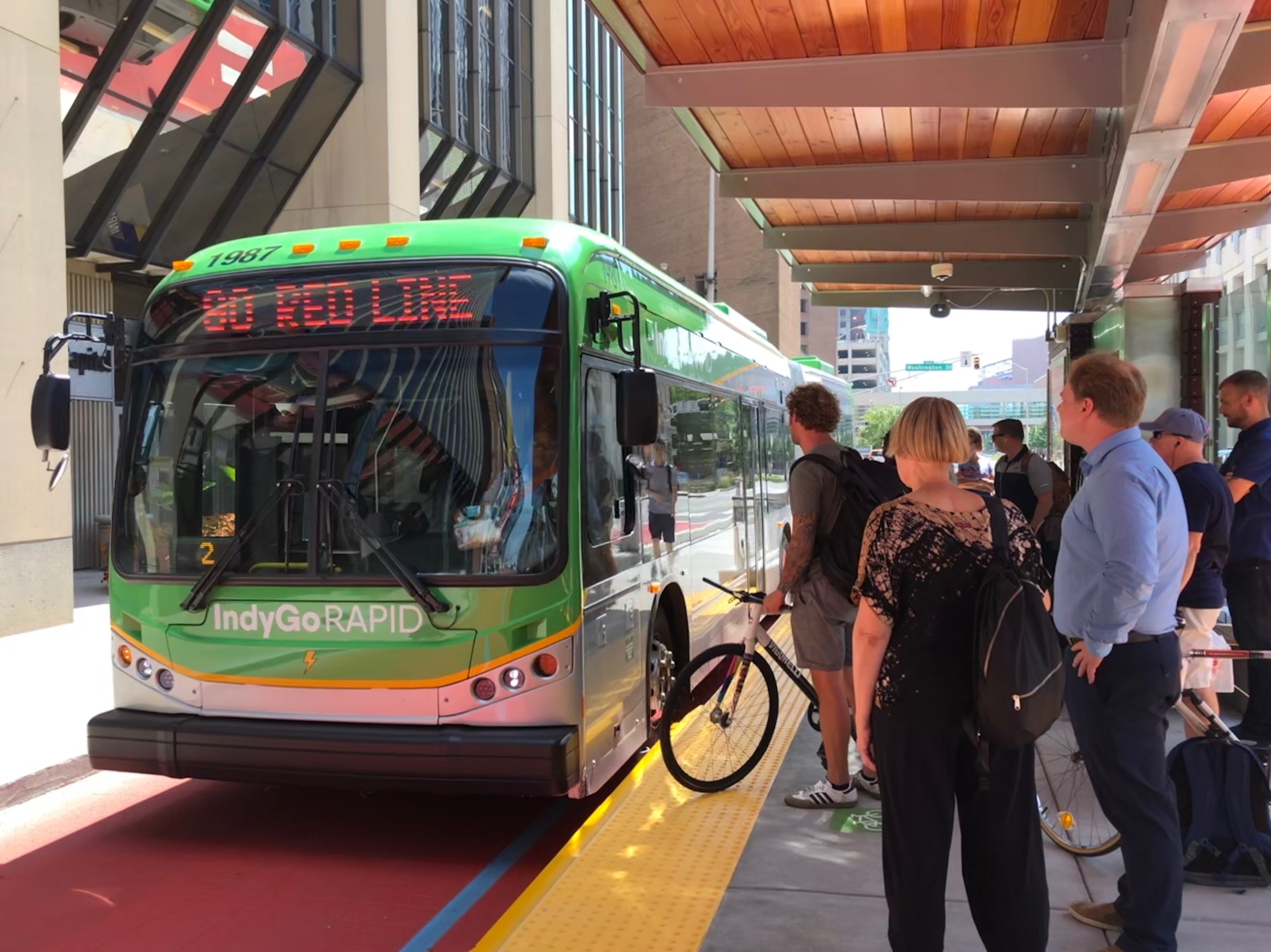
Passengers wait to board an arriving outbound Red Line bus in September 2019

The first of IndyGo's three bus rapid transit (BRT) projects, the Red Line, began service on September 1, 2019. The Red Line runs 13.1 miles (21.1 km) north–south from Broad Ripple Village to the University of Indianapolis. The 15.2-mile (24.5 km) Purple Line, the system's second BRT service, opened in October 2024, connecting downtown Indianapolis to the city of Lawrence. The third and final route, the Blue Line, is planned to run 24 miles (39 km) east–west from the town of Cumberland to the Indianapolis International Airport. Groundbreaking on the Blue Line took place on February 28, 2025, and is anticipated to open in 2028.

==== Streetcars and light rail ====
Historically, Indianapolis had an extensive streetcar network. In 1953, the last streetcars ran in the city, followed by the demise of trolleybuses four years later. Since 1957, the city's transit system has been exclusively served by bus.

Interest in reintroducing a streetcar system in the city began during the mayoral administration of Stephen Goldsmith in the 1990s. In 2008, civic leaders formed the Downtown Indianapolis Streetcar Corp., a nonprofit focused on studying the feasibility of a downtown streetcar circulator. After three years of study, the group proposed a 2-mile (3.2 km) streetcar circulator linking key attractions on the west side of downtown Indianapolis at an estimated cost of $20 to $25 million.

In 2008, the Central Indiana Regional Transportation Authority identified the former Nickel Plate corridor between downtown Indianapolis and the northern suburb of Noblesville as the initial leg of a proposed regional commuter rail network.

In 2010, the Central Indiana Transit Task Force released a $6.7 billion proposal with several recommendations for the region, including a north–south commuter rail line between Fishers and Greenwood and an east–west light rail line along Washington St. between Cumberland and the Indianapolis International Airport.

In 2014, the Indiana General Assembly granted Indianapolis and five neighboring counties the authority to raise local income taxes to fund public transit by referendum. As part of a legislative compromise, the bill included a provision prohibiting local governments from publicly financing light rail projects.

=== People mover ===
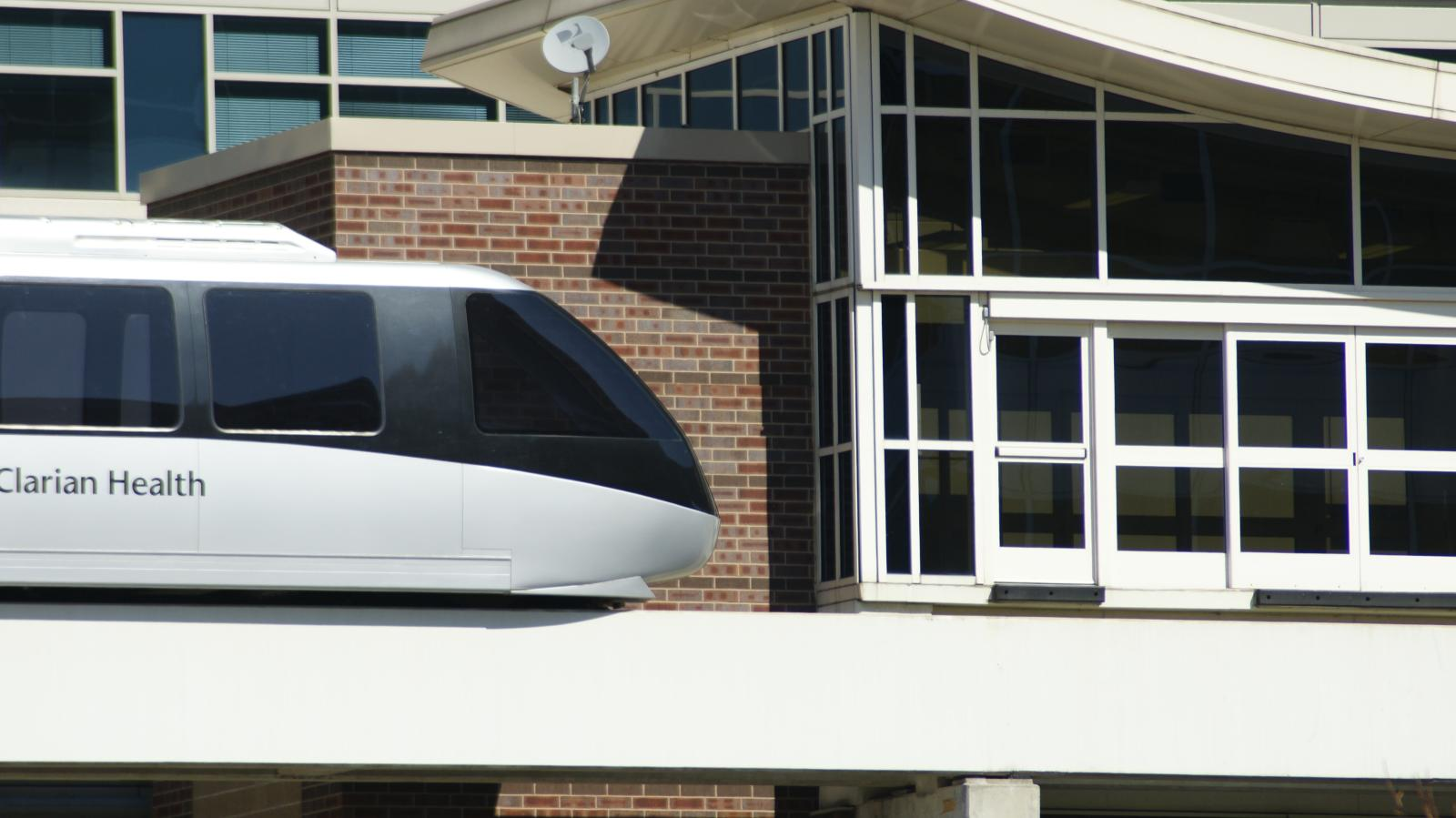
Indiana University Health (formerly Clarian Health) People Mover in 2009; the service operated from 2003 to 2019.

When it opened in 2003, the Indiana University Health People Mover spanned 1.4-mile (2.3 km), linking the Indiana University School of Medicine to the neighboring medical centers of Methodist, Riley Children's, and University hospitals via three elevated stations. Indiana University Health suspended service on the people mover in February 2019 due to rising maintenance costs, opting to replace the service with bus shuttles.

=== Private transportation companies ===
Indianapolis is served by more than 20 private transportation companies; providing private chauffeured sedan, SUV, charter bus and passenger van service. State operating authority is granted through the Indiana Department of Revenue. Due to lack of rural transport infrastructure, these companies often serve as primary means for inter-city transportation in Indiana.

== See also ==
- Indiana Central Canal
- Nickel Plate Trail
- Pennsy Trail
- Plug-in electric vehicles in Indiana § Indianapolis
