= Central Indiana Regional Transportation Authority =

Public transit provider in Indiana, United States

- Founded: 2007
- Headquarters: Indianapolis, Indiana
- Locale: Plainfield and Whitestown, Indiana
- Service area: Boone and Hendricks counties, Indiana
- Service type: Commuter bus, Vanpool
- Routes: 2
- Fleet: 3 buses
- Annual ridership: 123,647 (2019)
- Website: CIRTA

Central Indiana Regional Transportation Authority (CIRTA) is a provider of mass transportation in Boone and Hendricks counties with two routes serving Plainfield and Whitestown. As of 2019, the system provided 123,647 rides over 19,229 annual vehicle revenue hours with 3 buses and 31 vans.

== History ==
CIRTA was established in 2007. CIRTA improved the Plainfield Connector service with several bus shelters in 2020, as increased online shopping led to a greater need for warehouse workers along the route. Sunday service was previously offered in Plainfield and Whitestown, however it was eliminated in February 2023 due to low ridership. Similarly, CIRTA offered express bus service from Fishers to downtown Indianapolis up until 2015, but this was removed due to low ridership.

== Service ==
CIRTA operates vanpool service and two commuter bus routes connecting IndyGo riders to major employers in Plainfield and Whitestown. Hours of operation for the system are Monday through Friday from 5:10 A.M. to 7:05 P.M. and Saturdays from 5:10 A.M. to 7:08 P.M. There is no service on Sundays. Regular fares are $1.00.

=== Routes ===
- Plainfield Connector
- Whitetown Connector

== Fixed route ridership ==
The ridership statistics shown here are of fixed route services only and do not include vanpool services.

== See also ==
- List of bus transit systems in the United States
- Transportation in Indianapolis
- IndyGo
