= Purple Line (IndyGo) =

Bus rapid transit line in Indiana, US

IndyGo Purple Line
- Grand opening ceremony of the Purple Line station at the Indiana State Fairgrounds

Overview
- System: IndyGo Rapid
- Operator: Indianapolis Public Transportation Corporation
- Vehicle: BYD RIDE K11 articulated buses
- Status: Operational
- Began service: October 13, 2024

Route
- Route type: Bus rapid transit
- Locale: Indianapolis, Indiana, U.S.
- Start: Julia M. Carson Transit Center in Downtown Indianapolis
- Via: 38th Street
- End: Fort Harrison Station in Lawrence
- Length: 15.2 miles (24.5 km)
- Stations: 31

Service
- Ridership: 1,402,365 (2024) (Note: Combined ridership with Red Line)

The Purple Line is a bus rapid transit line operated by IndyGo in Indianapolis, Indiana, United States. It opened on October 13, 2024, with 31 stations on 15.2 miles (24.5 km) between Downtown Indianapolis and Lawrence. The Purple Line shares stations with the Red Line from the Julia M. Carson Transit Center to 38th Street, north of downtown, and continues east on 38th Street.

The Indianapolis–Lawrence corridor was one of five bus rapid transit lines proposed by IndyGo in the early 2010s. It was originally envisioned as an entirely east–west crosstown line between Lafayette Square Mall and Lawrence that would replace existing routes 38 and 39. The Federal Transit Administration awarded an $81 million grant for the project in 2021 that would cover approximately half of the $162 million cost for construction and new buses. Construction of the Purple Line began in February 2022. The fleet of articulated battery electric buses for the Purple Line, manufactured by BYD Auto, was unveiled in April 2024.

Since its opening, the Purple Line has had the highest monthly ridership of any IndyGo route, surpassing the Red Line. In March 2025, over 100,000 passengers rode the Purple Line.

== Station listing ==
There are 31 stations on the Purple Line, of which 13 are shared with the Red Line (Route 90).

Station	City	Type	Opened	Notes
Fort Harrison	Lawrence	Center	October 13, 2024	Serves Ivy Tech's Lawrence Campus, Fort Harrison State Park
56th Street	Lawrence	Median	October 13, 2024	Serves the Defense Finance and Accounting Service (DFAS) headquarters
Pendleton Pike	Lawrence	Median	October 13, 2024	
42nd Street	Lawrence	Median	October 13, 2024	
Post/38th	Indianapolis	Median	October 13, 2024	
Alsace	Indianapolis	Median	October 13, 2024	
Franklin	Indianapolis	Median	October 13, 2024	
Richardt	Indianapolis	Median	October 13, 2024	
Shadeland	Indianapolis	Median	October 13, 2024	
Arlington	Indianapolis	Median	October 13, 2024	
Layman	Indianapolis	Median	October 13, 2024	
Emerson	Indianapolis	Median	October 13, 2024	
Arthington	Indianapolis	Median	October 13, 2024	
Sherman	Indianapolis	Median	October 13, 2024	
Meadows	Indianapolis	Median	October 13, 2024	
Keystone	Indianapolis	Median	October 13, 2024	
Orchard	Indianapolis	Median	October 13, 2024	
State Fairgrounds	Indianapolis	Median	October 13, 2024	Serves the Indiana State Fairgrounds/Corteva Coliseum
Park	Indianapolis	Median	September 1, 2019	Beginning of overlap with Red Line
Meridian/38th	Indianapolis	Center	September 1, 2019	
34th Street	Indianapolis	Center	September 1, 2019	Serves Shortridge High School
30th/Museum	Indianapolis	Center	September 1, 2019	Serves the Children's Museum of Indianapolis
Fall Creek/Ivy Tech	Indianapolis	Center	September 1, 2019	Serves Ivy Tech's Downtown Indianapolis Campus
22nd Street	Indianapolis	Center	September 1, 2019	
18th Street	Indianapolis	Center	September 1, 2019	
IU Health	Indianapolis	Center	September 1, 2019	Serves IU Health Methodist Hospital
14th Street	Indianapolis	Center	September 1, 2019	
9th Street	Indianapolis	Center	September 1, 2019	
Vermont	Indianapolis	Center	September 1, 2019	
Statehouse	Indianapolis	Center	September 1, 2019	Serves the Indiana Statehouse
Julia M. Carson Transit Center	Indianapolis	Transit Center Bay	June 26, 2016	

== See also ==
- Transportation in Indianapolis
