= Red Line (IndyGo) =

Bus rapid transit line in Indiana, US

IndyGo Red Line
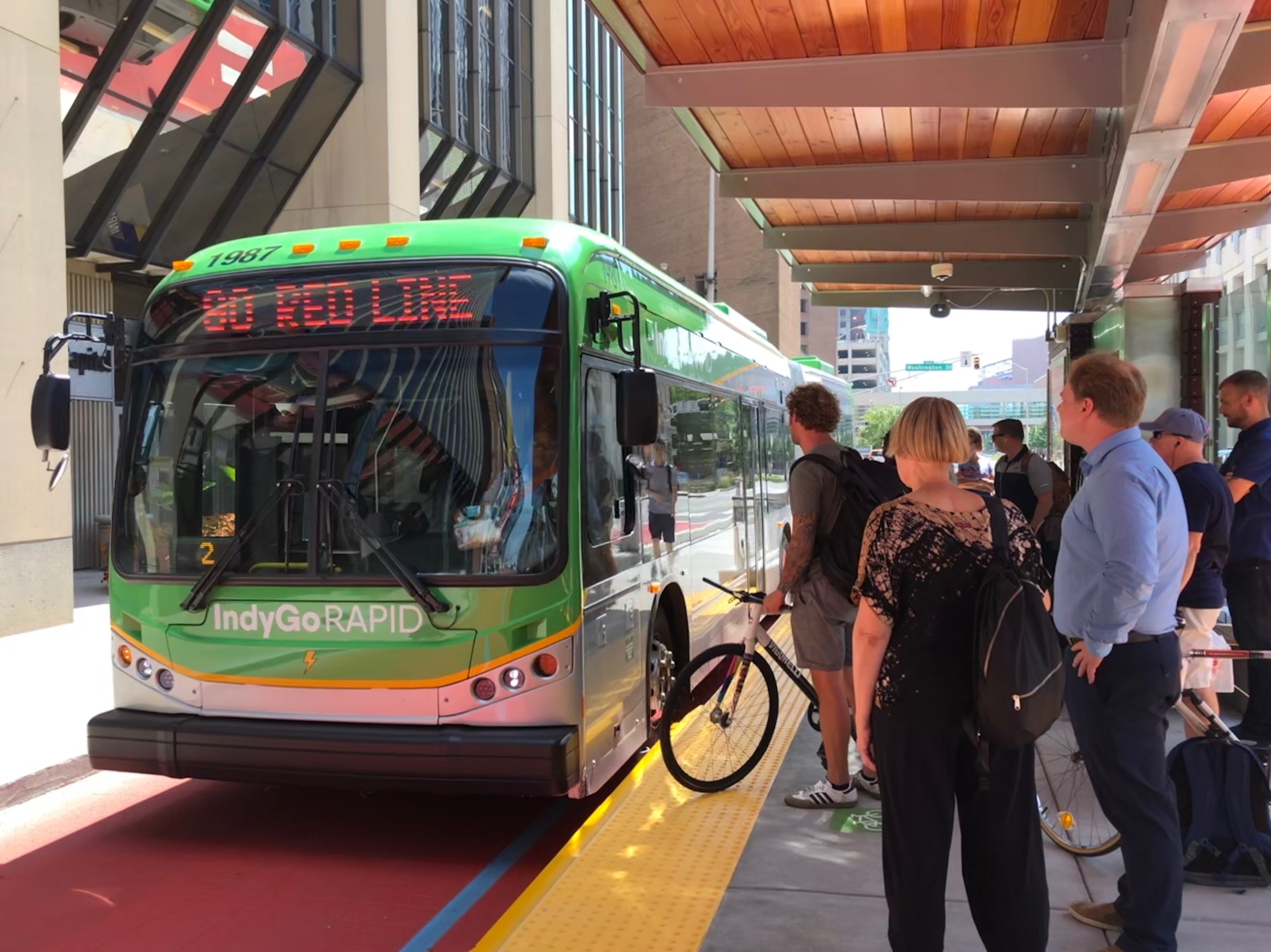
- Northbound IndyGo BYD battery electric bus at Statehouse Station

Overview
- System: IndyGo Rapid
- Operator: Indianapolis Public Transportation Corporation
- Garage: IndyGo Headquarters; 1501 W. Washington Street
- Vehicle: BYD K11 (60-foot articulated battery-powered electric transit bus)
- Status: Operational
- Began service: September 1, 2019

Route
- Route type: Bus rapid transit
- Locale: Indianapolis, Indiana
- Start: 66th Street & College Avenue station, north of Broad Ripple
- Via: Julia M. Carson Transit Center in Downtown Indianapolis
- End: University station (Campus Drive & Shelby Street)
- Length: 21.1 km (13.1 mi)
- Stations: 28

Service
- Ridership: 1,402,365 (2024) (Note: Combined ridership with Purple Line)

The Red Line of IndyGo is a bus rapid transit line serving parts of central, northern, and southern Indianapolis. The first phase of this transit route entered service on September 1, 2019, and was originally free for the first month; the free service was extended to the second and third months due to problems with the fare collection system. The Red Line links Broad Ripple to the University of Indianapolis via Downtown Indianapolis.

== History ==
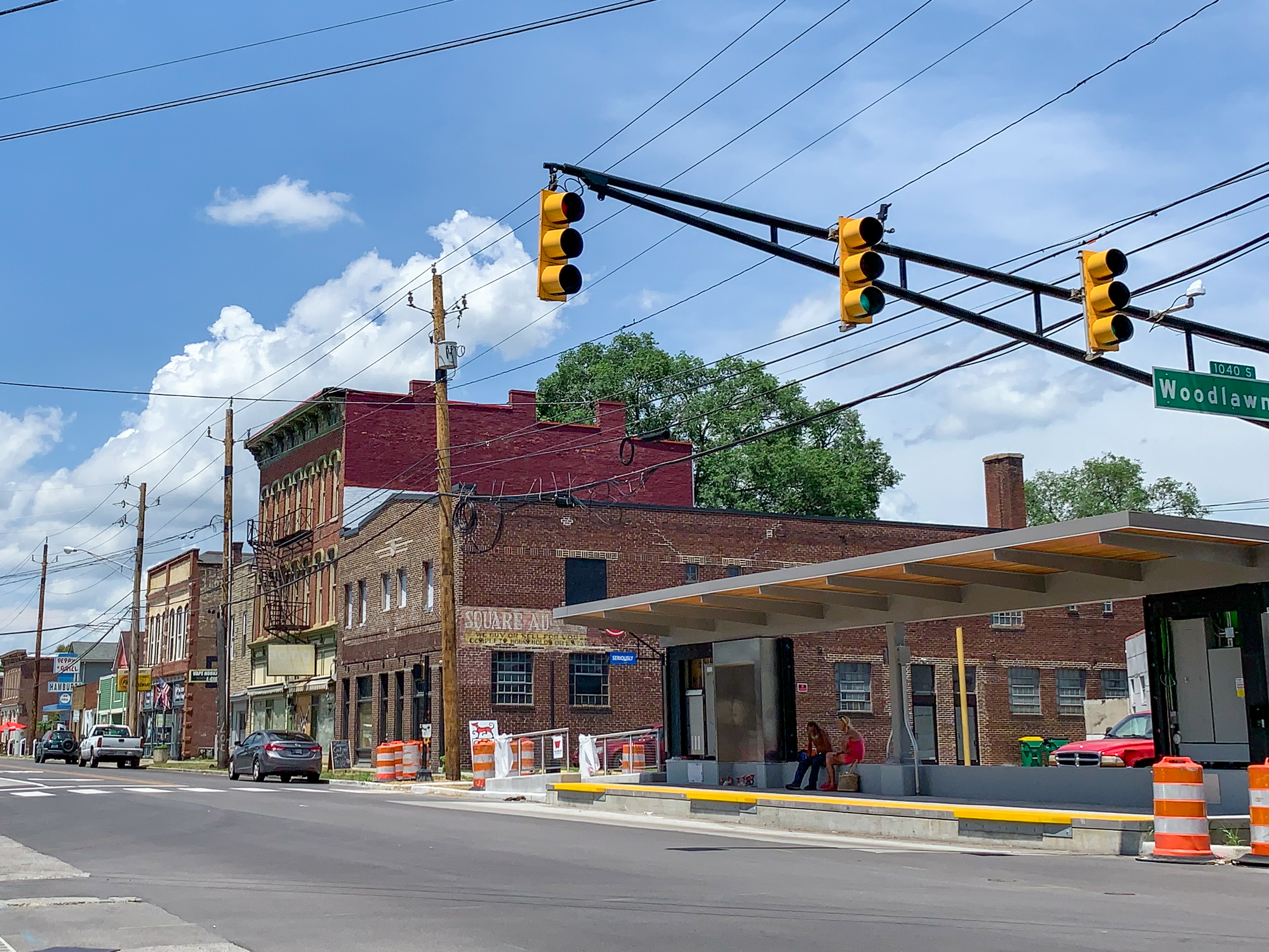
A Red Line station under construction in Fountain Square in July 2019.

On May 31, 2018, IndyGo began construction of the Red Line, the city's first Bus Rapid Transit (BRT) line. The first phase of the system opened on September 1, 2019, after about 15 months of construction and testing. The $96.3 million project included a $75 million grant from the Federal Transit Administration. Two additional BRT lines (Purple Line and Blue Line) are presently planned, along with proposed extensions on both ends of the Red Line. The Red Line has been assigned IndyGo Route #90.

Features of the Red Line include level boarding, dedicated bus lanes, and doors on both sides.

The Red Line serves Marion County with eventual service extensions planned to County Line Road/Madison Avenue at the southern boundary with Johnson County and a still undetermined alignment to the northern boundary with Hamilton County. A Johnson County extension to Smith Valley Road in Greenwood has been approved with early design work funded. A Hamilton County extension to Grand Park in Westfield has been proposed with early design work funded.

At introduction, every second BRT vehicle continued along the then proposed route of the Red Line beyond the completed BRT stations as "Route 90 - Red Line Local." This local line stopped at traditional bus stops to continue service to the northern and southern boundaries of Marion County. Due to traffic issues and low ridership, IndyGo discontinued this service. Since then, northbound service terminates at the 66th/College station and southbound service terminates at the University (Campus/Shelby) station. Dedicated local routes now provide supplementary service with Route 901 traveling as far north as 91st Street and Route 902 traveling as far south as County Line Road.

Due to Red Line buses failing to meet contractually obligated mileage ranges, bus manufacturer BYD paid for them to be retrofitted with inductive charging plates. These plates enable inductive charging of the buses en route to reduce service disruption. One inductive charging station was installed near the 66th/College station, another was planned near Madison Ave/County Line Rd, and a third planned near Ivy Tech Community College – Lawrence Campus.

On the morning of April 24, 2024, a Red Line bus on 38th street caught on fire. All four people got off the bus with only two having slight injures. Police arrested a 45-year-old man and preliminarily charged him with two counts of arson. IndyGo estimated the total damages to the bus and station at $2 million.

== Station listing ==
There are 28 stations on the Red Line, of which 13 are shared with the Purple Line (Route 92).

Station	Neighborhood	Type	Opened	Notes
66th Street	Broad Ripple	Curbside	September 1, 2019	
Broad Ripple	Broad Ripple	Center	September 1, 2019	
Kessler	Meridian–Kessler	Center	September 1, 2019	
54th Street	Meridian–Kessler	Center	September 1, 2019	
52nd Street	Meridian–Kessler	Center	September 1, 2019	
46th Street	Meridian–Kessler	Center	September 1, 2019	
42nd Street	Meridian–Kessler	Center	September 1, 2019	
Park	Mapleton–Fall Creek	Median	September 1, 2019	Ending of overlap with Purple Line
Meridian/38th	Mapleton–Fall Creek	Center	September 1, 2019	
34th Street	Mapleton–Fall Creek	Center	September 1, 2019	Serves Shortridge High School
30th/Museum	Mapleton–Fall Creek	Center	September 1, 2019	Serves the Children's Museum of Indianapolis
Fall Creek/Ivy Tech	Mapleton–Fall Creek	Center	September 1, 2019	Serves Ivy Tech's Downtown Indianapolis Campus
22nd Street	Near Northside	Center	September 1, 2019	
18th Street	Near Northside	Center	September 1, 2019	
IU Health	Near Northside	Center	September 1, 2019	Serves IU Health Methodist Hospital
14th Street	Near Northside	Center	September 1, 2019	
9th Street	Downtown	Center	September 1, 2019	
Vermont	Downtown	Center	September 1, 2019	
Statehouse	Downtown	Center	September 1, 2019	Serves the Indiana Statehouse
Julia M. Carson Transit Center	Downtown	Transit Center Bay	June 26, 2016	Purple Line terminus
New Jersey	Downtown	Curbside	September 1, 2019	
Fletcher Place	Downtown	Curbside	September 1, 2019	
Fountain Square	Fountain Square	Curbside	September 1, 2019	
Pleasant Run	Near Southside	Curbside	September 1, 2019	
Raymond	Garfield Park	Curbside	September 1, 2019	
Garfield Park	Garfield Park	Curbside	September 1, 2019	Serves Garfield Park
Troy	University Heights	Curbside	September 1, 2019	
University	University Heights	Center	September 1, 2019	Serves the University of Indianapolis

== See also ==
- Transportation in Indianapolis
