= HFY =

HFY may refer to:

- Greenwood Municipal Airport, in Indiana, United States
- Harpers Ferry (Amtrak station), in West Virginia, United States
- Hi Fly (airline), a Portuguese airline
