= Hendricks County Airport =

Coordinates: 39°44′48″N 086°28′31″W

Hendricks County Airport Gordon Graham Field
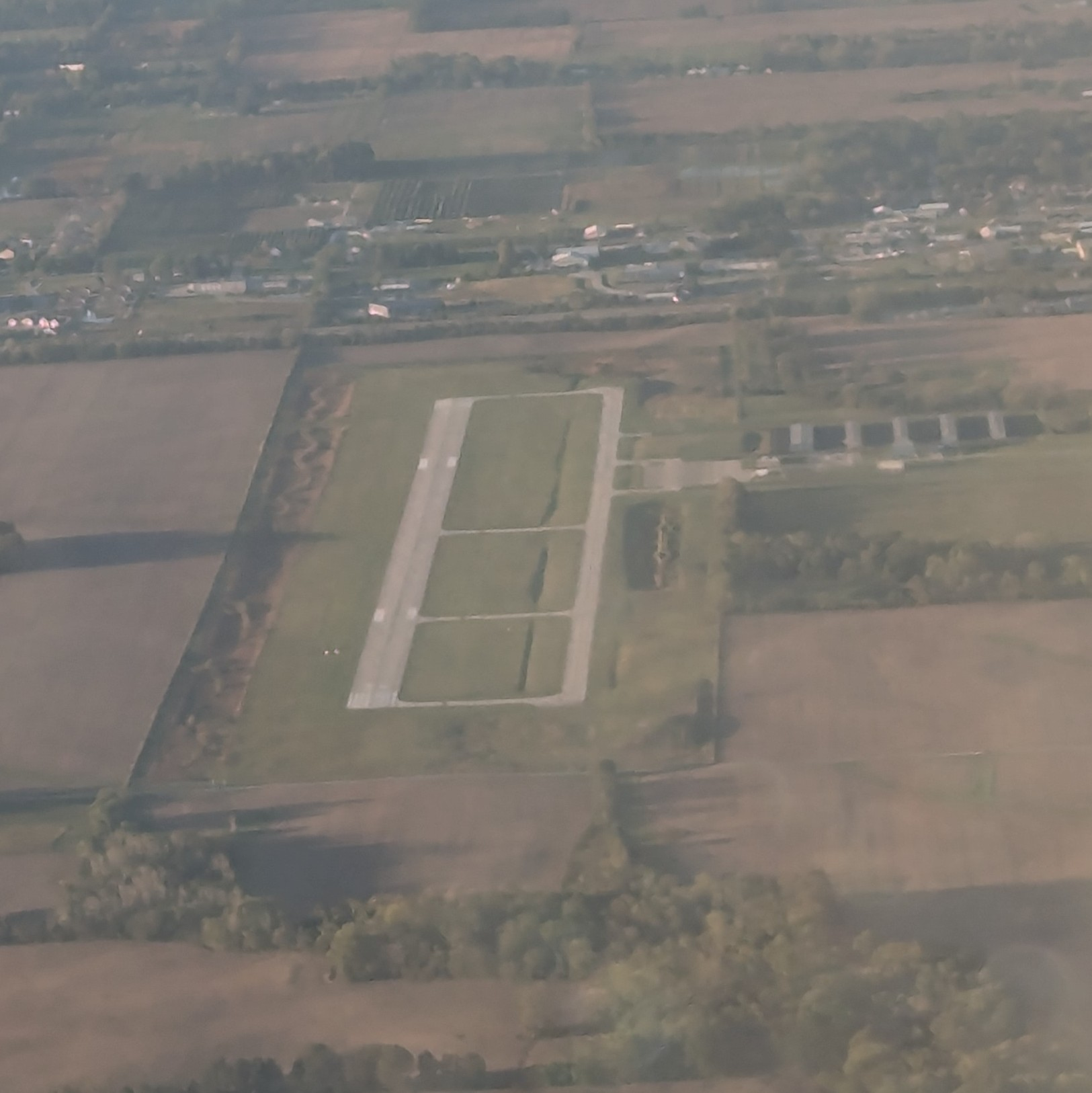
- IATA: none; ICAO: none; FAA LID: 2R2

Summary
- Airport type: Public
- Owner: Indianapolis Airport Authority
- Serves: Indianapolis, Indiana
- Location: Danville, Indiana
- Elevation AMSL: 897 ft (273 m)

Map
- Location of airport in Indiana 2R2 (the United States)

Runways
Direction	Length		Surface
Direction	ft	m	Surface
18/36	4,400	1,341	Asphalt

Statistics
- Aircraft operations (2019): 13,431
- Based aircraft (2023): 65
- Source: FAA

Hendricks County Airport (FAA LID: 2R2), also known as Gordon Graham Field, is a public airport at 2749 Gordon Graham Blvd. in Danville, a town in Hendricks County, Indiana, United States. Owned by the Indianapolis Airport Authority, it is located 13 miles (21 km) west of the central business district of Indianapolis and serves as a reliever airport for Indianapolis International Airport. The airport is also two miles (3 km) southeast from the center of Danville.

== Facilities and aircraft ==
Hendricks County-Gordon Graham Field covers an area of 239 acres (97 ha) and contains one runway designated 18/36 with a 4,400 x 100 ft (1,341 x 30 m) asphalt pavement. For the 12-month period ending December 31, 2019, the airport had 13,431 aircraft operations: 94% general aviation, 2% air taxi and 4% military. In November 2023, there were 65 aircraft based at this airport: 62 single-engine and 3 multi-engine.

== See also ==
- List of airports in Indiana
- Transportation in Indianapolis
