= IndyGo =

Public transit operator in Indianapolis, Indiana, US

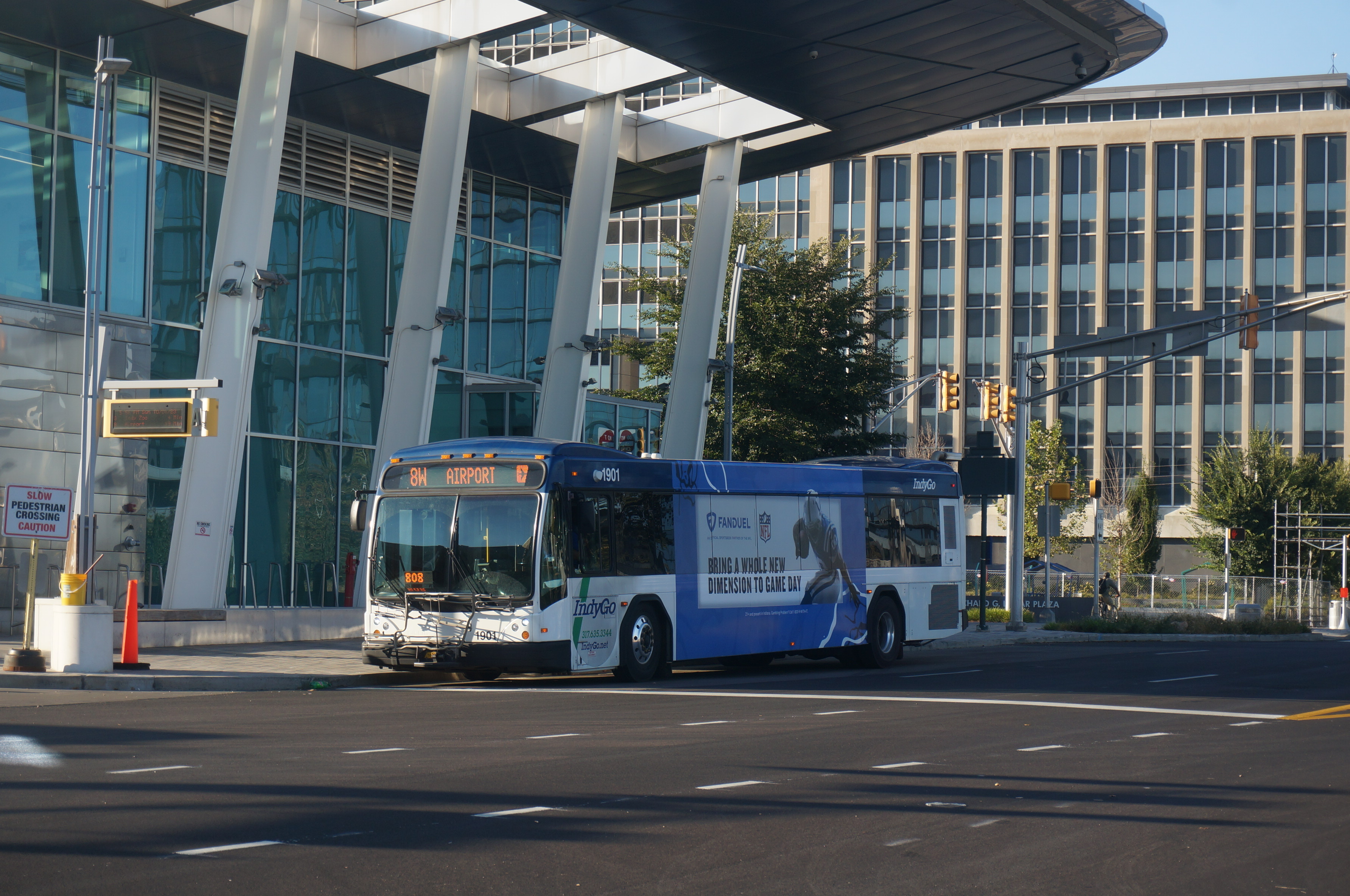
- Bus at the Julia M. Carson Transit Center in downtown Indianapolis
- Founded: January 7, 1975; 51 years ago
- Headquarters: 1501 West Washington Street, Indianapolis, Indiana
- Service area: Marion County, Indiana
- Service type: bus service, paratransit, bus rapid transit, microtransit
- Routes: 28 (26 fixed routes, 2 BRT)
- Stops: 3,385
- Hubs: Julia M. Carson Transit Center
- Stations: 46
- Fleet: 168
- Daily ridership: 22,900 (weekdays, Q2 2026)
- Annual ridership: 6,824,100 (2025)
- Fuel type: Diesel, diesel-electric hybrid, battery-electric
- Operator: City of Indianapolis
- Chief executive: Jennifer Pyrz
- Website: indygo.net

The Indianapolis Public Transportation Corporation, branded as IndyGo, is a public transit agency and municipal corporation of the City of Indianapolis in the U.S. state of Indiana. It operates fixed-route buses, bus rapid transit, microtransit, and paratransit services.

IndyGo has managed and operated the city's public bus transit system since 1975. In 2025, the system had a ridership of 6,824,100, or about 22,900 per weekday as of the second quarter of 2026.

== History ==
Indianapolis had a streetcar system that was established in 1854 and operated by various private companies until it was consolidated under the Indianapolis Street Railway Company in 1899 and later Indianapolis Railways in 1932. The final streetcar ran on January 10, 1953, and was replaced by a system of trolleybuses that operated from 1946 to 1957. Streetcar operator Indianapolis Transit System transitioned to motor coaches that followed the same routes as used by the streetcars. The city of Indianapolis took over public transportation in 1975 and established the Indianapolis Public Transportation Corporation to administer bus services. The corporation originally operated buses under the name Metro Bus; the IndyGo name was adopted on November 11, 1996. Portions of the system were briefly privatized in the 1990s, but the move proved unpopular, and all operations were ultimately taken over by the city.

IndyGo has seen a near-constant trend of decreasing ridership since the 1970s and continues to explore options for revitalization. "Express" bus routes were used in the 1980s as an attempt to gain more middle-class riders from outlying areas, but the routes were largely discontinued by the early 2000s.

The Blue Line downtown circulator route was added in 2005 to attract passengers and saw considerable ridership. In late 2006, IndyGo complemented the Blue Line with the introduction of the Red Line, which ran between the Indiana University–Purdue University Indianapolis campus and downtown with 15-minute frequency. The Blue Line's ridership declined as federal funding allotted for the route ran out, and the route was discontinued after December 31, 2007. The Red Line remained a free route until January 2009, at which time it became a regularly priced route. The Red Line was retired when the Downtown Transit Center opened, with IUPUI service being covered by Routes 3, 10, and 37, along with 15-minute frequency on Michigan and New York streets.

In the fall of 2007, IndyGo introduced an express route operated by a contractor, using ADA-accessible MCI J4500 motor coaches. The route ran from downtown to the northern suburb of Fishers in Hamilton County, the most populous suburban county of Indianapolis. In March 2008, an additional express route to Carmel (also in Hamilton County) was launched, followed in March 2009 by express service to Greenwood, a southern suburb in Johnson County. These ICE Express Routes to Greenwood, Fishers, and Carmel were discontinued in 2010 after their federal grants expired.

The Green Line, an express bus between downtown and Indianapolis International Airport, was also begun in 2007. It ceased operation on September 16, 2012, due to the expiration of the federal grant funding it, leaving local Route 8 to serve the airport.

=== Marion County Transit Plan ===
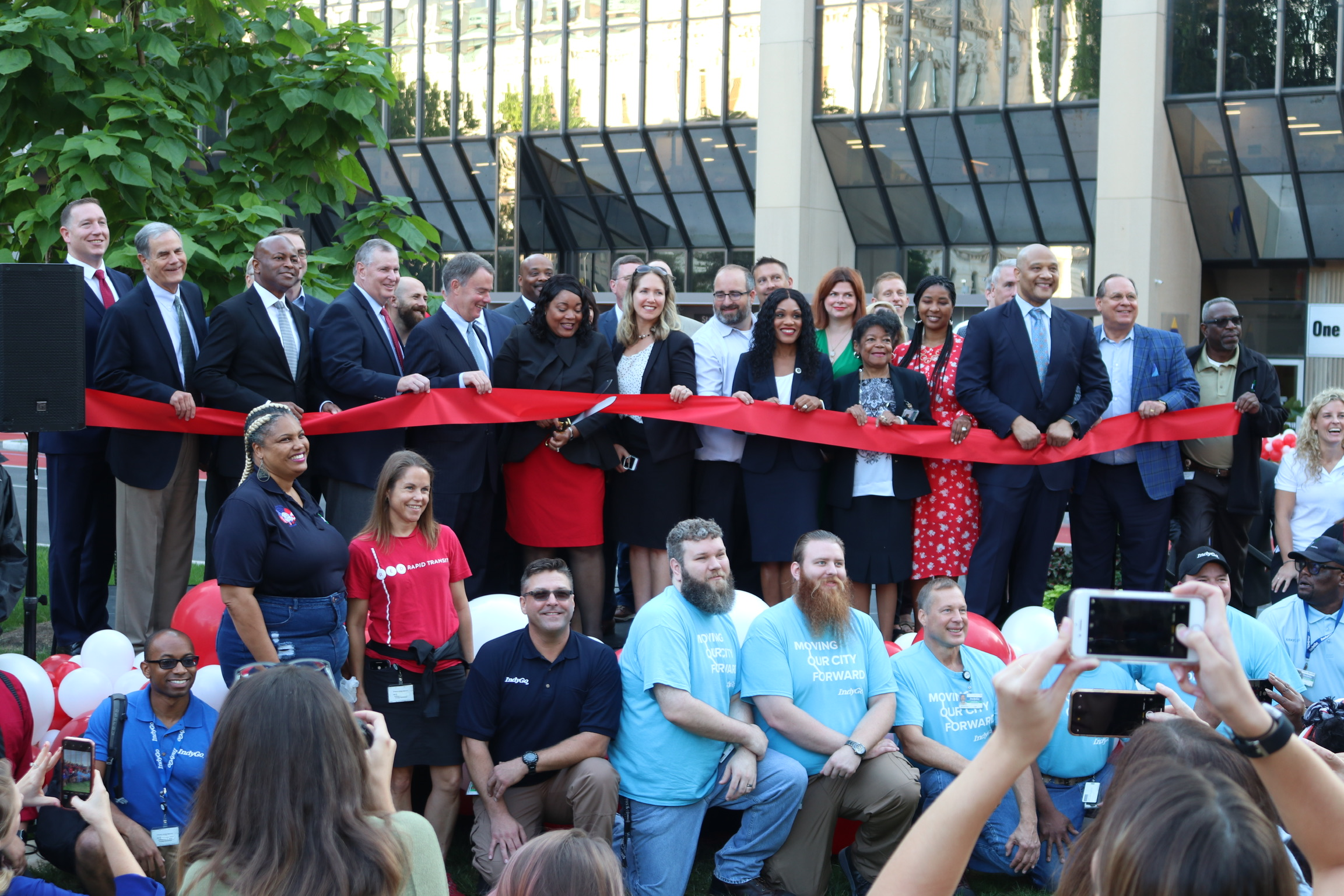
IndyGo CEO Inez Evans and dignitaries cut the ribbon at the opening of Indianapolis' first bus rapid transit route, the Red Line, in September 2019.

Indy Connect is a $1.2 billion plan to create a network of bus rapid transit lines, bikeways, and walkways. In 2017, City-County Council approved a voter referendum increasing Marion County's income tax to help fund IndyGo's first major system expansion since its 1975 founding. Local taxes and federal grants are funding systemwide improvements, including the creation of three bus rapid transit lines, battery electric buses, sidewalks, bus shelters, extended hours, and weekend schedules.

The first segment to be constructed is phase one of the Red Line, traveling 14 miles (23 km) from Broad Ripple Avenue to the University of Indianapolis. Construction along the route began in June 2018 and the route opened on September 1, 2019.

In February 2020, the corporation announced it would be canceling an order for five battery-powered coaches for Route 39 along East 38th Street due to reliability issues with the BYD vehicles. IndyGo stated in a press release that the company had not met its contract which required the buses to cover 275 miles (443 km) until recharging, nor did it provide a permanent enroute re-charging solution. The existing BYD vehicles have been moved to the Red Line, requiring a new $7.5 million contract for 13 40-foot (12 m) Gillig diesel vehicles for Route 39.

In March 2020, the Indiana General Assembly debated a 10% public funding cut for IndyGo, after lawmakers claimed that the corporation was not engaging with 2015 legislation which required it to seek up to 10% of its budget through private funding. Legislators have proposed withholding income tax money and preventing expansion routes until IndyGo meets its 10% funding goal. However, IndyGo CEO Inez Evans responded that the corporation had been unable to officially meet the target due to delays in establishing its foundation, which recently received $35,000 in private investment, and stated that public funding cuts could jeopardize its transit plans.

In April 2020, IndyGo postponed system-wide route changes as part of the Marion County Transit Plan implementation due to the COVID-19 pandemic. The changes would have switched the current hub-and-spoke system to a grid network that would allow for easier transfers across the city.

In August 2020, IndyGo initiated a "bus stop balancing" project to eliminate or consolidate 524 redundant or lightly used boarding bus stops and create 45 new bus stops. The effort was expected to expedite service on high-ridership routes.

Construction began on IndyGo's second bus rapid transit project, the Purple Line, on February 25, 2022. It opened to the public on October 13, 2024, with service primarily on 38th Street between downtown and Lawrence to the northeast. Since November 2024, the Purple Line has had the highest monthly ridership in the IndyGo system and reached 100,000 monthly passengers in April 2025.

Groundbreaking on the Blue Line, the third and final bus rapid transit project from Cumberland in the east to the Indianapolis International Airport west of downtown, took place on February 28, 2025, with construction anticipated to conclude in 2028. The Blue Line's use of dedicated bus lanes has been criticized by some state legislators, who introduced a bill in 2024 to ban them. The bill was dropped after IndyGo and the city government agreed to maintain two lanes in each direction for general purpose traffic in more sections of the route.

=== Julia M. Carson Transit Center ===
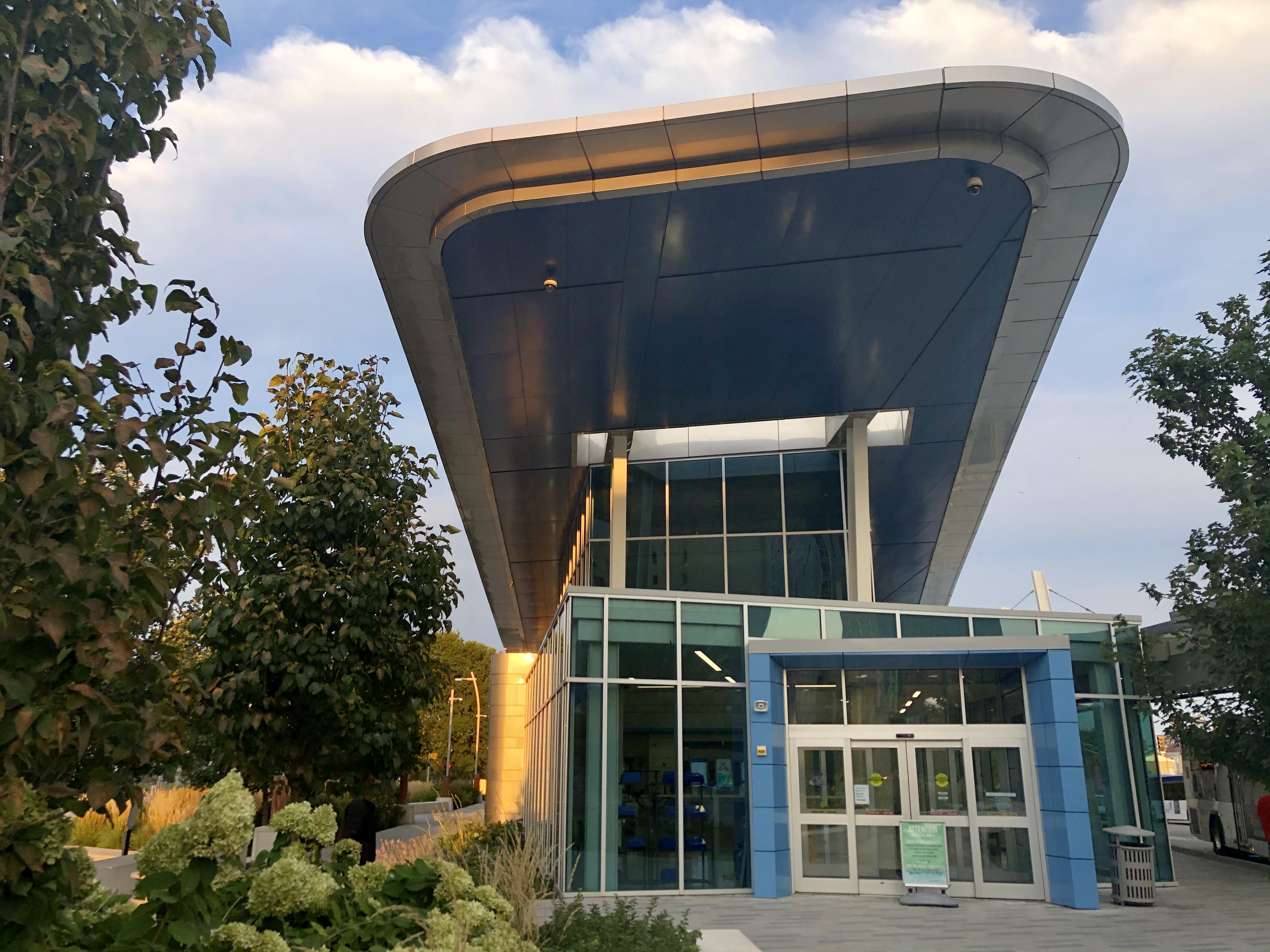
The Julia M. Carson Transit Center in 2020.

The Julia M. Carson Transit Center at 201 E. Washington Street serves routes that transit downtown Indianapolis. Ground was broken for the $26.5 million facility in September 2014. A ribbon-cutting ceremony was held on June 21, 2016, with formal bus service beginning on June 26, 2016. In addition to IndyGo's Customer Service Retail Center, the 14,000-square-foot (1,300.64 m^{2}) center includes free Wi-Fi, public restrooms, a conference room, administrative offices, bus operator lounge, seating, real-time arrival and departure information, 19 bus bays, and 700 square feet (65.03 m^{2}) of retail space. Of IndyGo's 31 routes, 26 routes offer transfers at the station.

The transit center is named for Julia Carson, former U.S. Representative for Indiana's 7th congressional district (1997–2007). During her tenure in Congress, Carson helped secure federal funding for the $26.5 million transit center.

== Routes ==
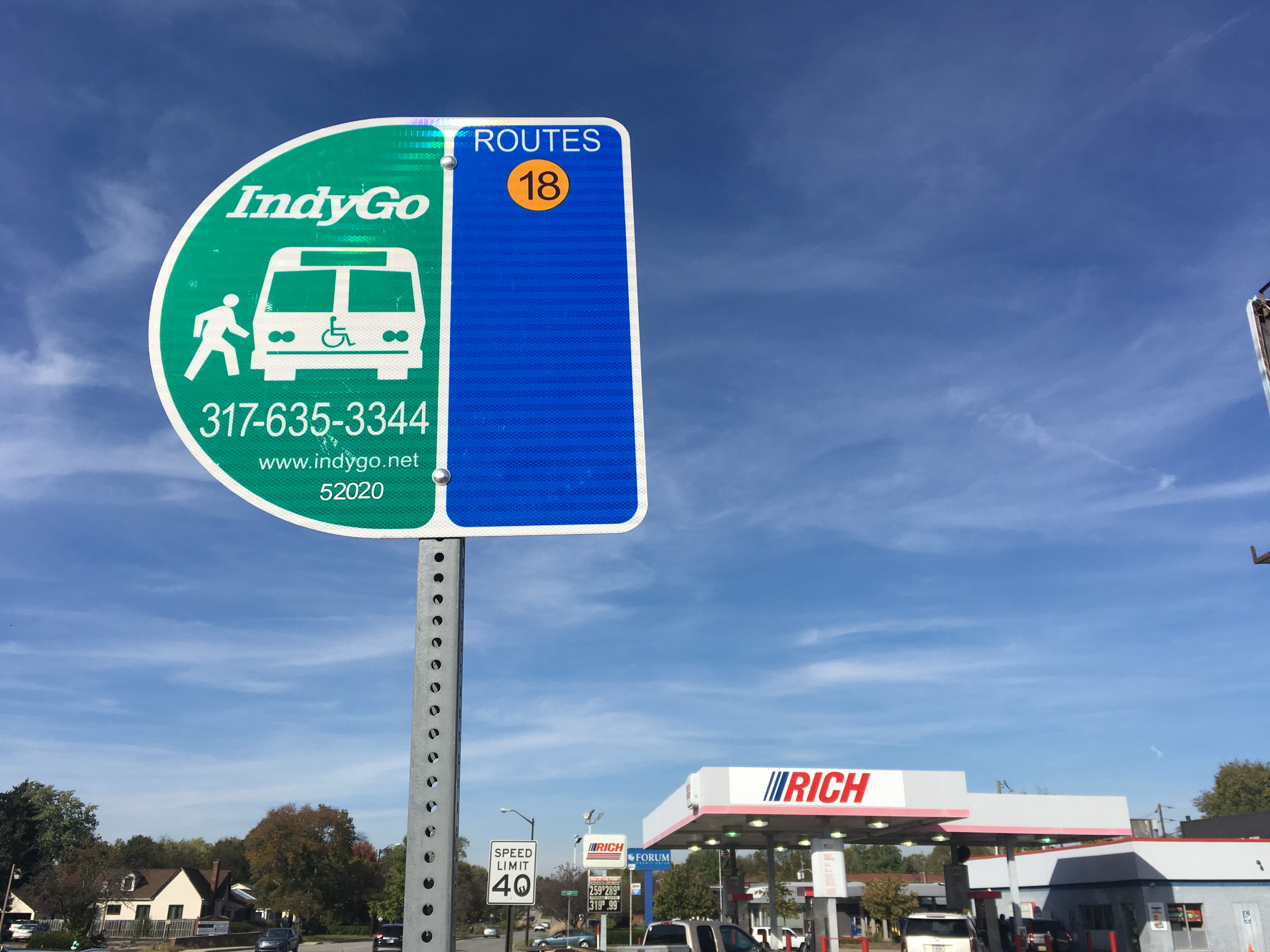
Standard bus stop sign for IndyGo's (now retired) Route 18 in 2017.

IndyGo operates 30 fixed routes with 2,850 stops; bus frequency varies on the population density along the route. While IndyGo provides bus service primarily in Indianapolis, certain IndyGo fixed routes extend south of the city into Johnson County.

=== Route list ===
- 2 – East 34th Street
- 3 – East Michigan Street
- 5 – East 25th Street
- 6 – Harding
- 7 – West Michigan Street
- 8 – Washington (Future Blue Line)
- 10 – 10th Street
- 11 – East 16th Street
- 13 – Raymond
- 15 – West 34th Street
- 16 – Emerson
- 19 – Broad Ripple
- 21 – East 21st Street
- 24 – Mars Hill
- 25 – West 16th Street
- 26 – Keystone
- 28 – St. Vincent
- 29 – South Madison
- 30 – 30th Street Crosstown
- 31 – US 31
- 34 – MLK/Michigan Road
- 37 – Park 100
- 38 – West 38th Street
- 56 – Beech Grove
- 82 – East 82nd Street
- 87 – Eastside Connector
- 90 – Red Line
- 92 – Purple Line

== Fares ==
Fares on IndyGo services can be paid for with cash, paper passes, or the MyKey reloadable card and app system, which generates a QR code that is scanned at transponders. The regular adult fare is $2.75 per ride and $6.00 per day; reduced fares are available for passengers 18 years or younger, 65 years or older, and people with documented disabilities. The MyKey system includes fare capping that automatically converts fares into day passes with enough rides. MyKey was launched in December 2019 by Flowbird and IndyGo for use on the Red Line, and expanded to other bus routes; its launch was delayed several months due to issues with the ticket vending machines at Red Line stations and confusion among passengers.

== Fleet ==
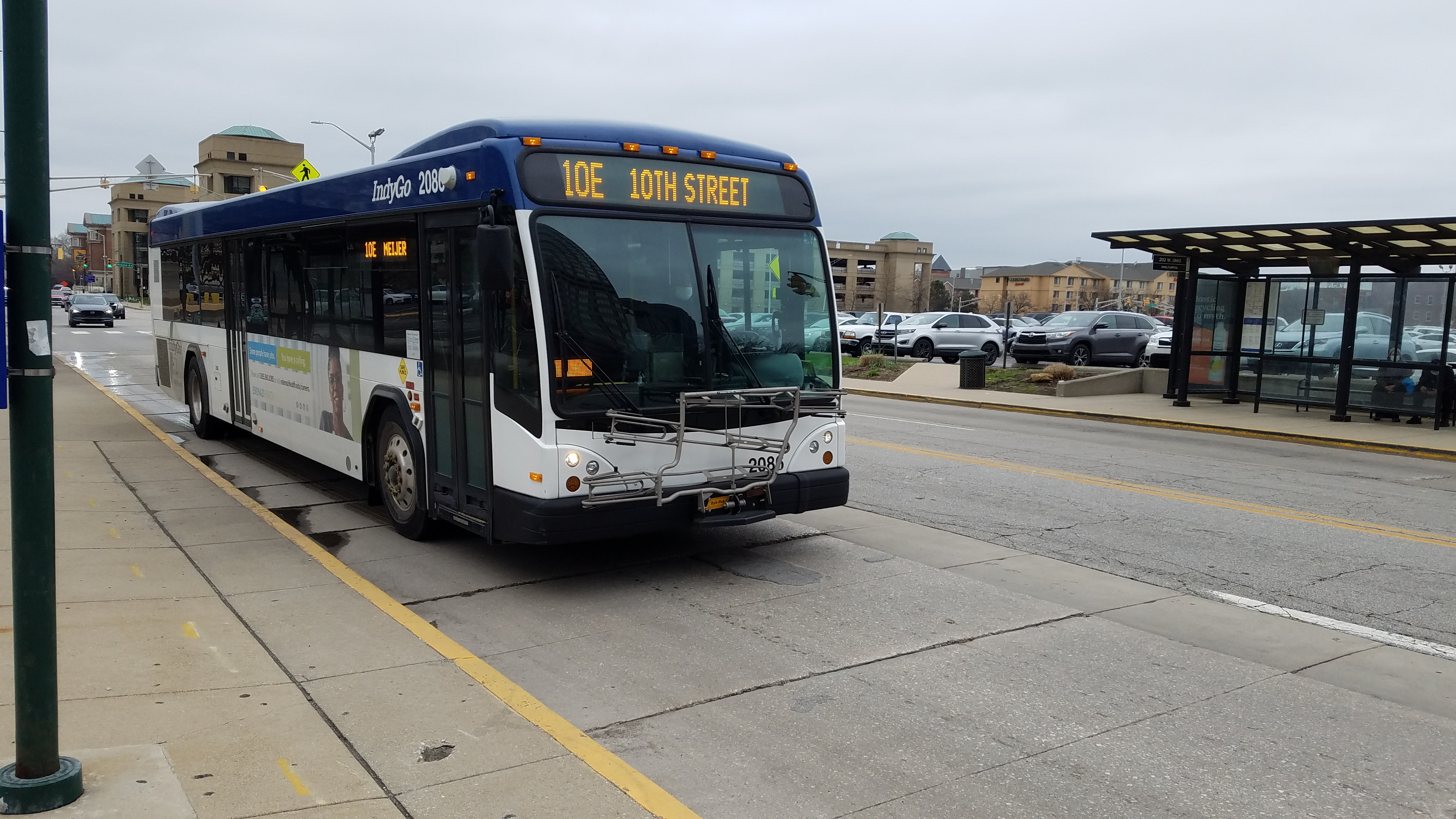
An eastbound 2020 Gillig Low Floor BRT bus near the intersection of Capitol Ave. and Ohio St. in downtown Indianapolis.

The standard fleet of the Indianapolis Transit System consisted mostly of dark orange/silverside GM Old Look and GM New Look buses; the latter 40-foot coaches were air-conditioned. When it became the Indianapolis Public Transportation Corporation (adopting the Metro name) in 1975, the New Looks became the workhorse of the fleet, with the agency later adding AM General, GM RTS-II series, GMDD Canada New Look, and Orion I buses to the lineup as the New Looks wore out by the mid-1990s. These buses were painted white with brown-gold-brown stripes and the "Metro" name next to the exit door (except for the Canadian New Looks, which sported a bold black top around its windows) up until the change to the IndyGo branding in 1997.

By 1986, the buses had three greenish-blue stripes immediately below the windows and the word "Metro" near the front door. From 1997 to 2010, the Phantoms and Low-Floor Coaches were painted white with one large dark green stripe on the right front window and one light green stripe over the first window on the left side. The dome of the newer ones from 2003 and 2007 had it painted in the back. Since 2010, all buses have been painted white and have a sleek blue cap at the top of them, except for the hybrid models, which have green caps.

=== Active bus fleet ===
Photos	Year	Manufacturer	Model	Fleet numbers	Engine	Transmission
	2010	Gillig	BRT 40'	1001–1011	Cummins ISL9	Allison B400R
	2011	Gillig	BRT HEV 40'	1012H-1022H	Cummins ISL9	Allison H 40 EP hybrid system
	2013	Gillig	BRT HEV 40'	1301H-1304H	Cummins ISL9	Allison H 40 EP hybrid system
	2012	Gillig	BRT 40'	1401	Cummins ISL9	Allison B400R
	2013	Gillig	BRT 40'	1402–1406	Cummins ISL9	Allison B400R
	2014	Gillig	BRT 40'	1407–1413	Cummins ISL9	Allison B400R
	2015	Gillig	BRT 40'	1501–1513	Cummins ISL9	Allison B400R
	2016	Gillig	BRT 40'	1601–1613	Cummins ISL9	Allison B400R
	2017	Gillig	BRT 40'	1701–1716	Cummins L9	Allison B400R
	2018	Gillig	BRT 40'	1801–1817	Cummins L9	Allison B400R
	2018	BYD	K11M 60'	1899	BYD	
	2019	Gillig	BRT 40'	1901–1916	Cummins L9	Allison B400R
	2019	BYD	K11M 60'	1970–1999	BYD	
	2020	Gillig	BRT 40'	2072–2099	Cummins L9	Allison B400R
	2021	Gillig	BRT Plus HEV 40'	2101H-2124H	Cummins L9	Allison H 40 EPTM hybrid system
	2022	Gillig	BRT Plus HEV 40'	2125H-2127H	Cummins L9	Allison eGen Flex H 40 hybrid system
	2023	BYD	K11M 60'	2390–2399	BYD	
	2024	Gillig	BRT Plus HEV 40'	H2401	Cummins L9	Allison eGen Flex H 40 hybrid system
	2024	BYD	K11M 60'	2482–2499	BYD	
	2025	Gillig	BRT Plus HEV 40'	H2501-H2520	Cummins L9	Allison eGen Flex H 40 hybrid system

IndyGo also operates 40 paratransit vans and employs a contractor to operate an additional 40.

==== Purchased secondhand ====
- 9789–9799: 1997 New Flyer Industries D40LF 40-foot low floor buses. IndyGo purchased these from Santa Monica. These buses are retired.
- 0101-0118: 2000 New Flyer Industries D40LF 40-foot low floor buses. IndyGo purchased these buses early 2018 from COTA. These buses are retired.
- 0130-0140: 2000 New Flyer Industries D40LF 40-foot low floor buses. IndyGo purchased these buses from COTA in 2013. These buses are retired.
- 0001-0021: 40-foot low floor buses with ZEPS electric powertrains. IndyGo purchased these buses in 2015 for operation on shorter routes, as the buses can go 130 miles on a single charge. These buses are retired.
- 0201-0217: 2002 New Flyer Industries D60LF 60-foot articulated low floor buses. IndyGo purchased these buses from Los Angeles to hold more passengers on busier routes. These buses are retired.

== See also ==
- Government of Indianapolis
- Transportation in Indianapolis
- List of bus transit systems in the United States
- List of bus rapid transit systems in North America
