= Indy South Greenwood Airport =

- IATA: none; ICAO: KHFY; FAA LID: HFY

Summary
- Airport type: Public
- Owner: Greenwood BOAC
- Operator: City of Greenwood
- Location: Greenwood, Indiana
- Elevation AMSL: 822 ft (251 m)
- Coordinates: 39°37′39″N 86°05′17″W
- Website: http://www.greenwood.in.gov/department/index.php?structureid=14

Map
- Location of airport in Indiana HFY (the United States)

Runways
| Direction | Length | | Surface |
| Direction | ft | m | Surface |
|---|---|---|---|
| 1/19 | 5,102 | 1,555 | Asphalt |

Statistics
- Aircraft operations (2022): 27,944
- Based aircraft (2023): 91
- Source: Federal Aviation Administration

Indy South Greenwood Airport (ICAO: KHFY, FAA LID: HFY) (previously Greenwood Municipal Airport) is a city-owned public-use airport in Greenwood, a city in Johnson County, Indiana, United States. It is 10 miles (16 km) southeast of Downtown Indianapolis. The airport was founded in September 1947 and is primarily used for general aviation. The airport has several on-field businesses, including a flight school and maintenance shop. In 2022 the airport was awarded Airport of the Year by Aviation Indiana.

== Facilities and aircraft ==
In 2020, the Indiana State Police moved the base for the Aviation and Special Operations sections to the airport. Other operators include a Civil Air Patrol squadron, and a chapter of the Experimental Aircraft Association. The airport is home to the Young Eagles Aeronautical Center of Technology, funded by the city and private donors, offering supplementary education programs for students across Johnson County to study, robotics, drone technology, physics, mathematics and meteorology in addition to initial flight training.

Indy South Greenwood Airport covers an area of 208 acres (60 ha) at an elevation of 822 feet (251 m) above mean sea level. It has one runway designated 1/19 with an asphalt surface measuring 5,102 by 75 feet (1,555 x 23 m) with approved GPS and VOR approaches. In the year ending December 31, 2022, the airport had 27,944 aircraft operations, an average of 77 per day: 93% were general aviation, 3% air taxi and 4% military. In November 2023, there were 91 aircraft based at this airport: 80 single-engine, 3 multi-engine, 5 jet and 3 helicopter.

== Accidents and incidents ==
On 30 July 2025, Anh-Thu Nguyen, founder of the non-profit Asian Women in Aerospace and Aviation (AWAA) was killed when her Lancair IV-P crashed shortly after take-off from the airport. Nguyen became the 10th woman (and first Vietnamese woman) to fly solo around the world in 2024. She was attempting to repeat the feat, departing for on the second leg of her journey to Pennsylvania when the accident occurred. She was recording a vlog of her progress stating she hoped to empower women to follow their dreams. The accident received significant national and international media attention due to her public profile.

== See also ==
- List of airports in Indiana
- Transportation in Indianapolis
