= Julia M. Carson Transit Center =

Public transit hub in Indiana, US

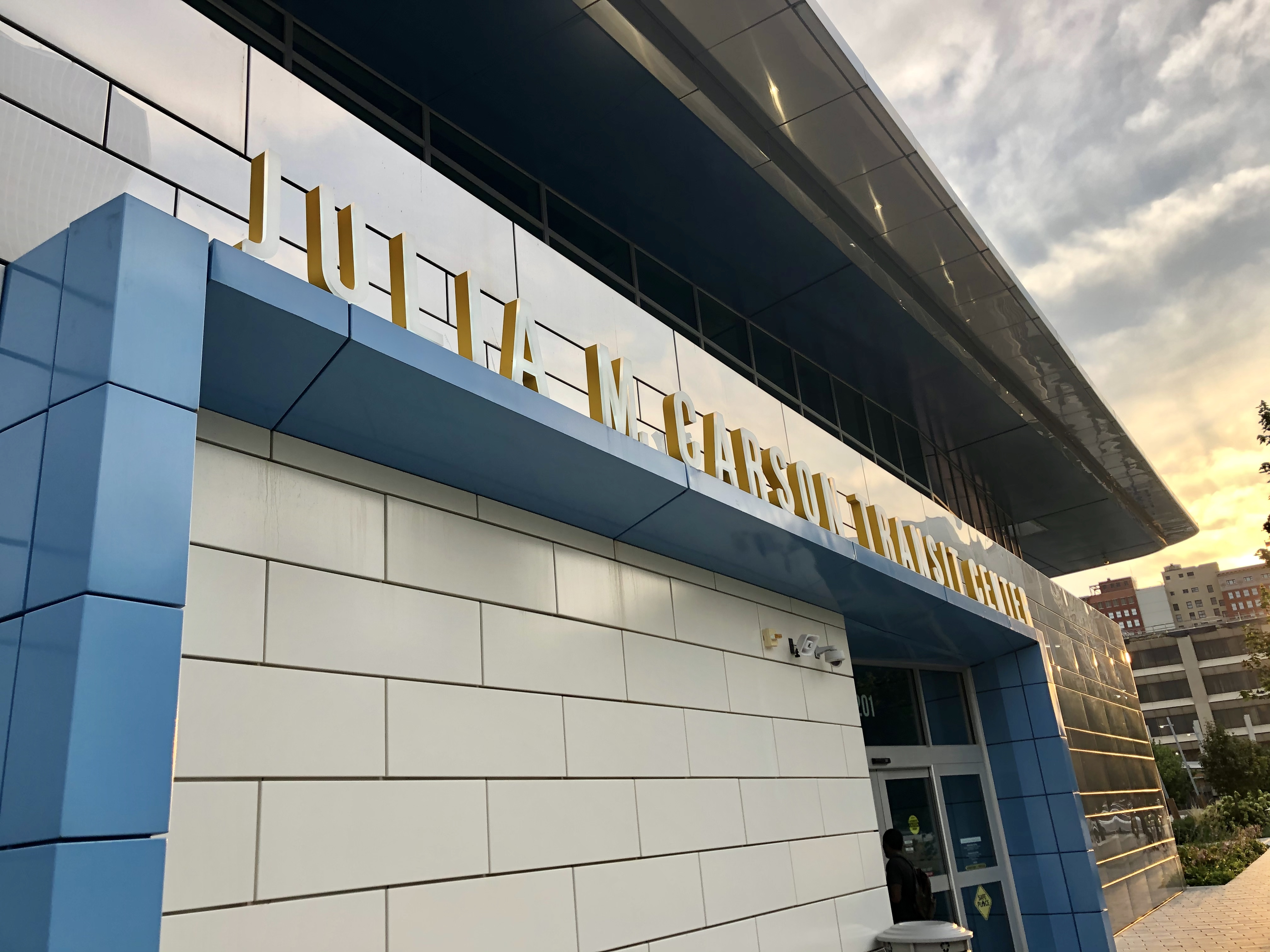
- Front entrance of the Julia M. Carson Transit Center

General information
- Other names: Downtown Transit Center
- Location: 201 East Washington Street, Indianapolis, Indiana 46204
- Coordinates: 39.7667°N 86.1531°W
- Owner: Indianapolis Public Transportation Corporation
- Bus routes: 25
- Bus stands: 19
- Bus operators: IndyGo

Construction
- Cycle facilities: Yes
- Accessible: Yes

Other information
- Website: Julia M. Carson Transit Center

History
- Opened: June 26, 2016
Location

The Julia M. Carson Transit Center is the hub for public transit in Indianapolis, Indiana. Opened in 2016, it is sited in downtown Indianapolis at 201 East Washington Street and is near the Cultural Trail and YMCA Bike Hub. The center received awards for "Excellence in Built Environment" at the Indianapolis Chamber of Commerce's Monumental Awards ceremony in 2017.

A waiting pavilion and IndyGo services center comprise the northeastern portion of the facility.

The center is named after Julia M. Carson, a member of the United States House of Representatives from 1997 until her death in 2007.

== Facilities ==
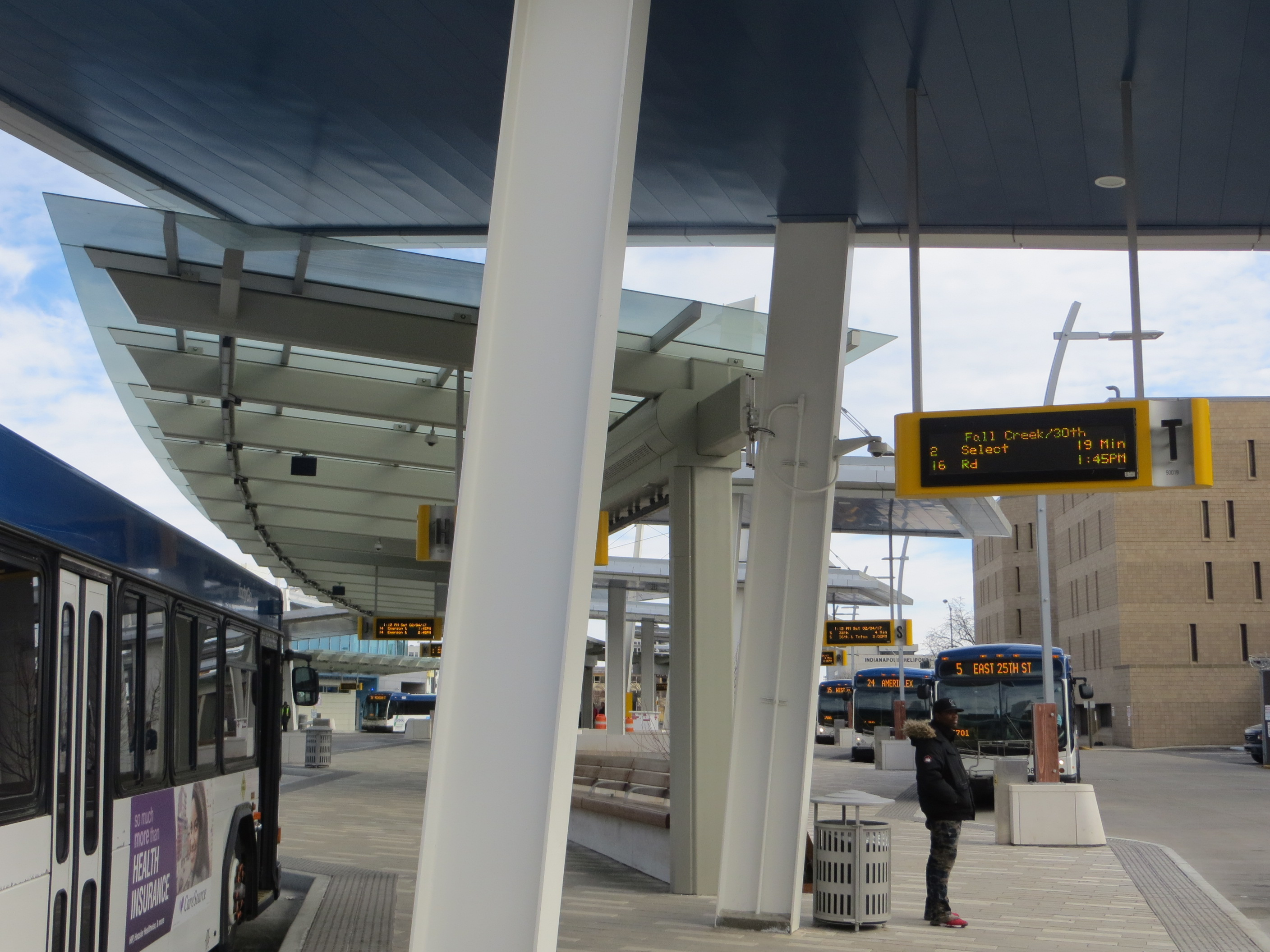
Exterior details at the transit center

The facility is located on a half-block of land in the Mile Square that is bounded on the north by Washington Street, the east by Alabama Street, the west by Delaware Street, and the south by Pearl Street. It is between the City-County Building and its Richard G. Lugar Plaza to the north and the present Marion County Jail I to the south.

The facility contains nineteen right-side entry/exit bus bays, with two curbside bays (one each along Alabama and Delaware streets), eleven in the middle portion of the center, and six along the north curb of Pearl Street. These bays are identified by letter, from A through H and J through T.

Upon completion, IndyGo's Customer Service Retail Center moved from 34 North Delaware Street to the 14,000-square-foot (1,300.64 m^{2}) center. Additionally, the center includes free Wi-Fi, public restrooms, a conference room, administrative offices, a bus operator lounge, seating, real-time arrival and departure information, 19 bus bays, and 700 square feet (65.03 m^{2}) of retail space. Of IndyGo's 31 routes, 26 routes offer transfers at the station.

The facility has contained a mobile health clinic since February 2023. A pilot program had run from May 2022 through October 2022.

== History ==
After years of planning, public officials held a groundbreaking for IndyGo's downtown transit center in September 2014. The site, a surface parking lot bounded by East Washington, East Pearl, South Delaware, and South Alabama streets in downtown Indianapolis, was the public transportation corporation's first unified transit center. The project was paid for with a $13.5 million federal grant and $6.5 million from the agency's capital improvement budget.

In May 2015, construction halted after excavators unearthed archaeological finds dating to the 1800s, including building foundations. The discoveries delayed the project seven months and increased costs by $5 million, with work commencing in October 2015.

In April 2016, the Indianapolis City-County Council passed a special resolution formally naming the transit center for Julia Carson, former U.S. Representative for Indiana's 7th congressional district from 1997 until her death in 2007. During her tenure in Congress, Carson helped secure federal funding for the $26.5 million transit center.

A ribbon-cutting ceremony was held on June 21, 2016, with formal bus service beginning on June 26, 2016. Several bays were closed and reconfigured in 2024 for the Purple Line, the second bus rapid transit line operated by IndyGo.

Since its completion, the transit center has received accolades for its contemporary design and environmental-sustainability components. The Indy Chamber recognized the project at its 40th Monumental Awards on October 19, 2017. IndyGo's design team, including AECOM, Axis Architecture + Interiors, Guidon Design, Rundell Ernstberger Associates (REA), and Loftus Engineering, Inc., received the Honor in Architecture, Achievement in Engineering, and Honor in Landscape Architecture awards. The transit center is Leadership in Energy and Environmental Design (LEED) Gold certified.
