= National Register of Historic Places listings in Hancock County, Indiana =

Location of Hancock County in Indiana

This is a list of the National Register of Historic Places listings in Hancock County, Indiana.

This is intended to be a complete list of the properties and districts on the National Register of Historic Places in Hancock County, Indiana, United States. Latitude and longitude coordinates are provided for many National Register properties and districts; these locations may be seen together in a map.

There are 14 properties and districts listed on the National Register in the county. Another two properties were once listed but have been removed.

Properties and districts located in incorporated areas display the name of the municipality, while properties and districts in unincorporated areas display the name of their civil township. Properties and districts split between multiple jurisdictions display the names of all jurisdictions.

This National Park Service list is complete through NPS recent listings posted October 30, 2026.

== Current listings ==
| | Name on the Register | Image | Date listed | Location | City or town | Description |
|---|---|---|---|---|---|---|
| 1 | Charles Barr House | Charles Barr House | December 22, 2008 (#08001208) | 25 W. Walnut St. 39°47′14″N 85°46′12″W | Greenfield | |
| 2 | Rufus and Amanda Black House | Rufus and Amanda Black House | September 30, 2014 (#14000802) | 222 S200W at Philadelphia; 39°46′45″N 85°50′29″W | Sugar Creek Township | |
| 3 | Browne-Rafert House | Browne-Rafert House | September 14, 2015 (#15000595) | 534 N. Merrill St., near Fortville; 39°56′21″N 85°51′15″W | Vernon Township | |
| 4 | County Line Bridge | County Line Bridge | November 25, 1994 (#94001356) | County Road 900E over the Big Blue River, northeast of Morristown; 39°42′35″N 85°37′59″W | Blue River Township | Extends into Rush County |
| 5 | Fortville Carnegie Library | Fortville Carnegie Library | August 19, 2024 (#100010744) | 115 N. Main Street; 39°56′05″N 85°51′01″W | Fortville | |
| 6 | Fortville Methodist Episcopal Church | Fortville Methodist Episcopal Church | August 21, 2024 (#100010745) | 125 East Staat Street; 39°56′04″N 85°50′56″W | Fortville | |
| 7 | Greenfield Courthouse Square Historic District | Greenfield Courthouse Square Historic District | March 7, 1985 (#85000455) | Roughly bounded by North, Hinchman, South, and Pennsylvania Sts. 39°47′07″N 85°46′10″W | Greenfield | |
| 8 | Greenfield Residential Historic District | Greenfield Residential Historic District | December 15, 2011 (#11000909) | Roughly bounded by Hendricks, South, and Wood Sts., and Boyd Ave. 39°47′07″N 85°46′23″W | Greenfield | |
| 9 | Lilly Biological Laboratories | Lilly Biological Laboratories | November 23, 1977 (#77000016) | West of Greenfield off U.S. Route 40; 39°46′51″N 85°47′51″W | Greenfield | |
| 10 | Lincoln Park School | Lincoln Park School | June 17, 2009 (#09000424) | 600 W. North St. 39°47′09″N 85°46′37″W | Greenfield | |
| 11 | Frank Littleton Round Barn | Frank Littleton Round Barn | April 2, 1993 (#93000184) | Near the junction of County Roads 600N and 500W, northeast of Mount Comfort; 39°52′22″N 85°53′25″W | Vernon Township | |
| 12 | Lockheed PV-2 Harpoon No. 37396 | Lockheed PV-2 Harpoon No. 37396 | May 1, 2009 (#09000234) | 3867 N. Aviation Way at the Indianapolis Regional Airport; 39°50′37″N 85°54′12″W | Buck Creek Township | |
| 13 | Jane Ross Reeves Octagon House | Jane Ross Reeves Octagon House | September 16, 2001 (#01000620) | 400 S. Railroad St. 39°53′32″N 85°34′45″W | Shirley | |
| 14 | James Whitcomb Riley House | James Whitcomb Riley House | September 28, 1977 (#77000017) | 250 W. Main St. 39°47′06″N 85°46′24″W | Greenfield | |

== Former listings ==
| | Name on the Register | Image | Date listed | Date removed | Location | City or town | Description |
|---|---|---|---|---|---|---|---|
| 1 | Greenfield High School | | April 22, 1982 (#82000039) | June 18, 1986 | North and Pennsylvania Sts. | Greenfield | Destroyed by fire on April 30, 1985 |
| 2 | New Palestine School | | June 14, 1991 (#91000791) | March 17, 1992 | Larrabee St. at jct. with Depot St. | New Palestine | |

== See also ==
- List of National Historic Landmarks in Indiana
- National Register of Historic Places listings in Indiana
- Listings in neighboring counties: Hamilton, Henry, Madison, Marion, Rush, Shelby
- List of Indiana state historical markers in Hancock County
