= List of Indiana state historical markers in Hancock County =

Location of Hancock County in Indiana

This is a list of the Indiana state historical markers in Hancock County.

This is intended to be a complete list of the official state historical markers placed in Hancock County, Indiana, United States by the Indiana Historical Bureau. The locations of the historical markers and their latitude and longitude coordinates are included below when available, along with their names, years of placement, and topics as recorded by the Historical Bureau. There are 3 historical markers located in Hancock County.

== Historical markers ==
Marker title	Image	Year placed	Location	Topics
Birthplace of Democratic Party Rooster		1966	E. Main Street (U.S. Route 40) at Riley Park in Greenfield; 39°47′9.4″N 85°45′24″W	Politics
Birthplace James Whitcomb Riley "The Hoosier Poet" October 7, 1849-July 22, 1916		1967	250 W. Main Street (U.S. Route 40) in Greenfield; 39°47′7″N 85°46′24.6″W	Arts and Culture
John William "Will" Vawter		2020	West Main Street (U.S. 40) west of State Street (Indiana Route 9) in Greenfield; 39°47′07″N 85°46′13″W	Art & Culture

== See also ==
- List of Indiana state historical markers
- National Register of Historic Places listings in Hancock County, Indiana
