= James Whitcomb Riley House =

James Whitcomb Riley House may refer to:

- James Whitcomb Riley Museum Home, the author's adult home
- Riley Birthplace and Museum, the author's childhood home
