= Greenfield Residential Historic District =

Historic district in Indiana, United States

- U.S. National Register of Historic Places
- U.S. Historic district
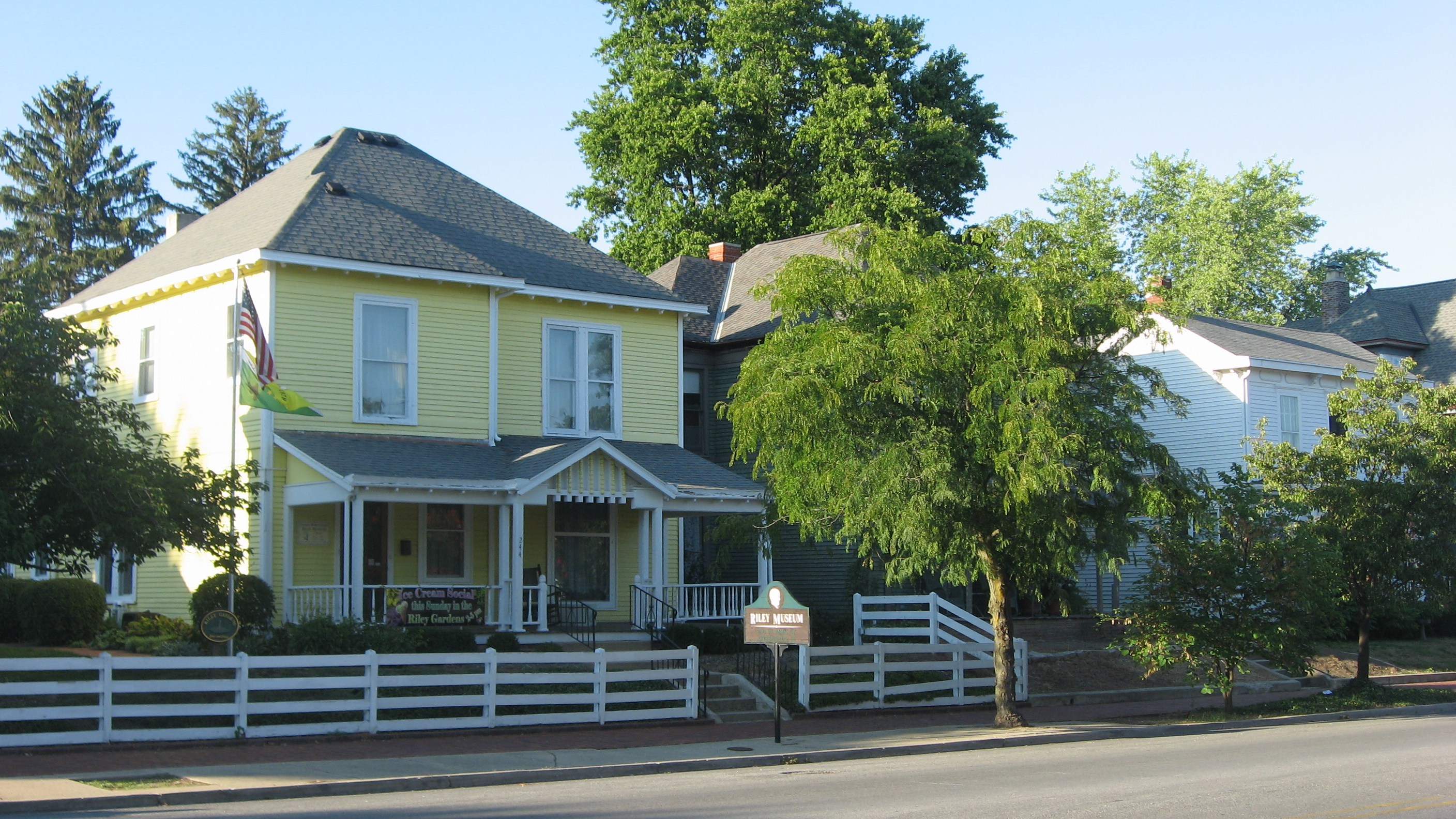
- West Main near the Riley Birthplace, August 2012

- Location within Indiana Location within the United States
- Location: Roughly bounded by Hendricks, South, and Wood Sts., and Boyd Ave., Greenfield, Indiana
- Coordinates: 39°47′07″N 85°46′23″W
- Area: 187.12 acres (75.72 ha)
- Built: 1880
- Architect: Felt, John H.
- Architectural style: Greek Revival, Gothic Revival, Italianate, Queen Anne, Colonial Revival, Neoclassical, Mission Revival, Bungalow/Craftsman
- NRHP reference No.: 11000909
- Added to NRHP: December 15, 2011

Greenfield Residential Historic District is a national historic district located at Greenfield, Indiana. The district encompasses 523 contributing buildings, one contributing site, and 15 contributing structures in a predominantly residential section of Greenfield. It developed between about 1880 and 1947, and includes notable examples of Greek Revival, Gothic Revival, Italianate, Queen Anne, Colonial Revival, Neoclassical, Mission Revival, and Bungalow / American Craftsman style architecture. Located in the district are the separately listed Charles Barr House and James Whitcomb Riley House. Other notable buildings are St. Michael's Catholic Church (1898), Shiloh Primitive Baptist Church (c. 1900), Chair Factory (c. 1880), Friends Meeting House (c. 1890), and two Lustron houses (c. 1947).

It was listed on the National Register of Historic Places in 2011.
