= Adelia Pope Branham =

American writer

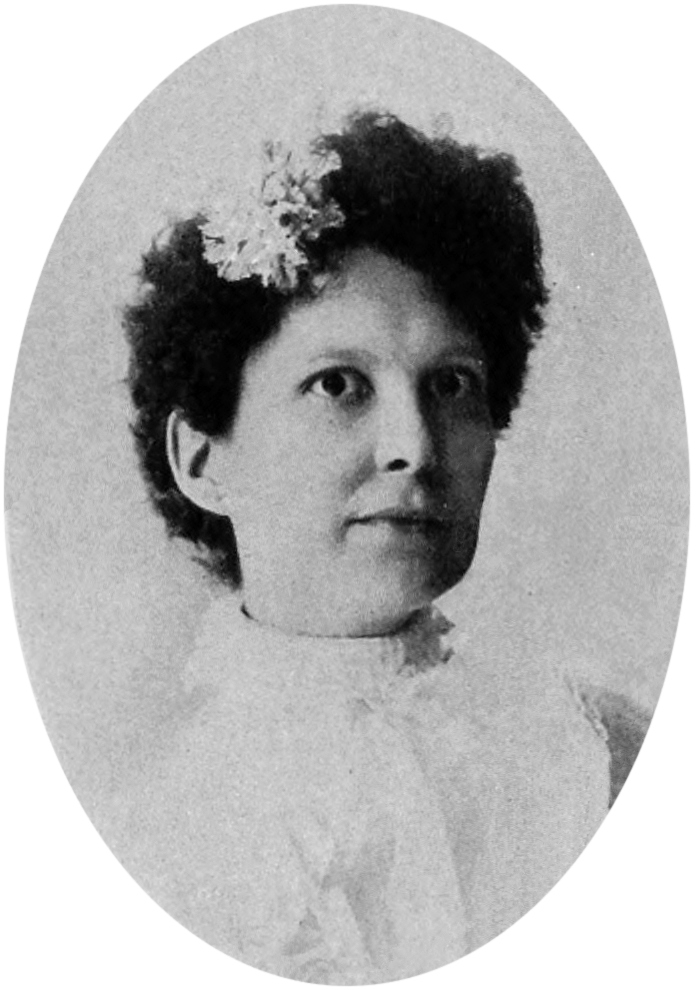
- Born: Adelia Pope; October 13, 1861; Greenfield, Indiana, U.S.
- Died: January 12, 1917 (aged 55); Greenfield, Indiana, U.S.
- Occupation: writer
- Spouse: Howard S. Branham (m. 1885)
- Writing career
- Genres: poetry; prose; short stories

Adelia Pope Branham (October 13, 1861 – January 12, 1917) was an American writer of poetry and prose. Many of her poems were set to music by composers, and were published. She became a short story writer after 1899.

== Early life and education ==
Adelia Pope was born in Greenfield, Indiana, October 13, 1861, and lived all her life at Greenfield. She had at least one sibling, a sister, Mrs. James F. Reed.

Branham was educated in the local schools.

== Career ==
As a young woman, she began writing verses and prose articles that were accepted by the local papers.

She married Howard S. Branham in 1885. He was at that time and for several years afterward, in the newspaper business, serving in all departments. He founded the first daily paper published in Greenfield, The Evening Tribune. In the years of the husband's newspaper work, he was assisted by his wife, who conducted special departments and also took a private hand in political controversy. Her work at this time was anonymous.

It was not long, however, until poems from Branham's pen began to appear in several Indiana publications, besides the Indianapolis Sentinel, for which she was a regular contributor. She next accepted regular work on Chicago and Eastern magazines. The poem, "Resurgo", which appeared in the Christian Standard, of Cincinnati, and "The Day We Thresh", which was published in The Century Magazine, New York City, were some of her best productions. Many of her poems were set to music by composers, and were published. Among the poems receiving very favorable notice were "Resurgo", "The Day We Threshed", and "Out in God's Fields".

Branham did not devote any time to the short story until after the publication of her first volume of poems in 1899. Upon the request of publishers, she entered the field of short-story writers, writing for children and adults. Short stories that received special recognition were, "More Stately Mansions," "The House on the Sand," "The Other Prodigal," and "In the Far Country."

A Daughter of April (1903), prose, was published by Abbey Press (New York, N.Y.). A book of children's verse, Grandma Tales and Others (1899), was illustrated by Will Vawter, a Greenfield artist.

In later life, she was writing almost exclusively for the religious press. Her stories in the way of religious fiction were used widely in Sunday schools and in Christian Endeavor societies, but she also held her place among magazine writers. For some time, Branham was on the regular contributing staff of the Christian Standard, and did much of the special work of this magazine. She was a member of the Loyal Women's Bible Class, Greenfield.

== Death ==
A few days before her death, Branham had been staying at a sanitarium at Indianapolis, where she had undergone a surgical operation. She died at Greenfield, Indiana, January 12, 1917.

== Selected works ==
Grandma tales and others

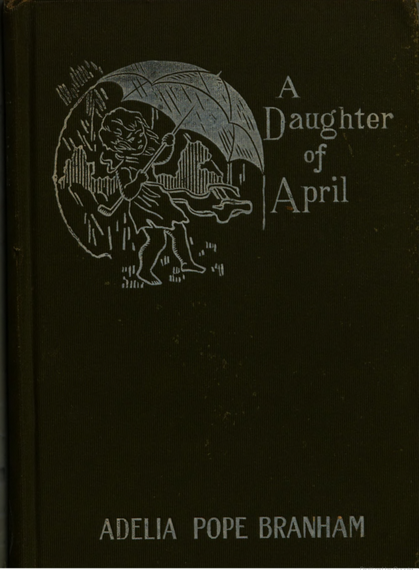
A Daughter of April

=== Books ===
- Grandma Tales and Others, (1899, poetry collection)
- A Daughter of April, 1903
- April Showers (prose)

=== Poems ===
- "Resurgo"
- "The Day We Threshed"
- "Out in God's Fields"

=== Short stories ===
- "More Stately Mansions"
- "The House on the Sand
- "The Other Prodigal"
- "In the Far County"
