= Douglass Sherley =

American poet (1857–1917)

George Douglass Sherley (June 27, 1857– December 28, 1917) was an author, journalist, and poet. Sherley was born and lived in Louisville, Kentucky, USA. He was born into a wealthy family with interests in railroad companies and inherited the family's estate. He graduated from Centre College and then studied law at the University of Virginia. He worked as a journalist for the Louisville Courier-Journal beginning in the 1870s despite his millionaire status. He wrote poetry and short stories which he published using his own wealth during the 1880s.

His works received little attention until he partnered with the popular poet James Whitcomb Riley in 1893 to tour the United States. Riley helped Sherley gain acceptance in the western literary community and, as part of Riley's show, he performed with other major talents including Samuel Clemens. After Riley and Sherley stopped touring in 1895, Sherley returned to live in both Louisville and Lexington, Kentucky, where he continued writing poetry and short stories, and three novels. His best selling books were Love Perpetuated, A Few Short Sketches and The Inner Sisterhood, published by J.P. Morton & Company. He had success writing short stories to serve as introductions to sheet music and other authors' works.

He died in Martinsville, Indiana, and is buried in the Cave Hill Cemetery in Louisville.
