= Lilly Biological Laboratories =

- U.S. National Register of Historic Places
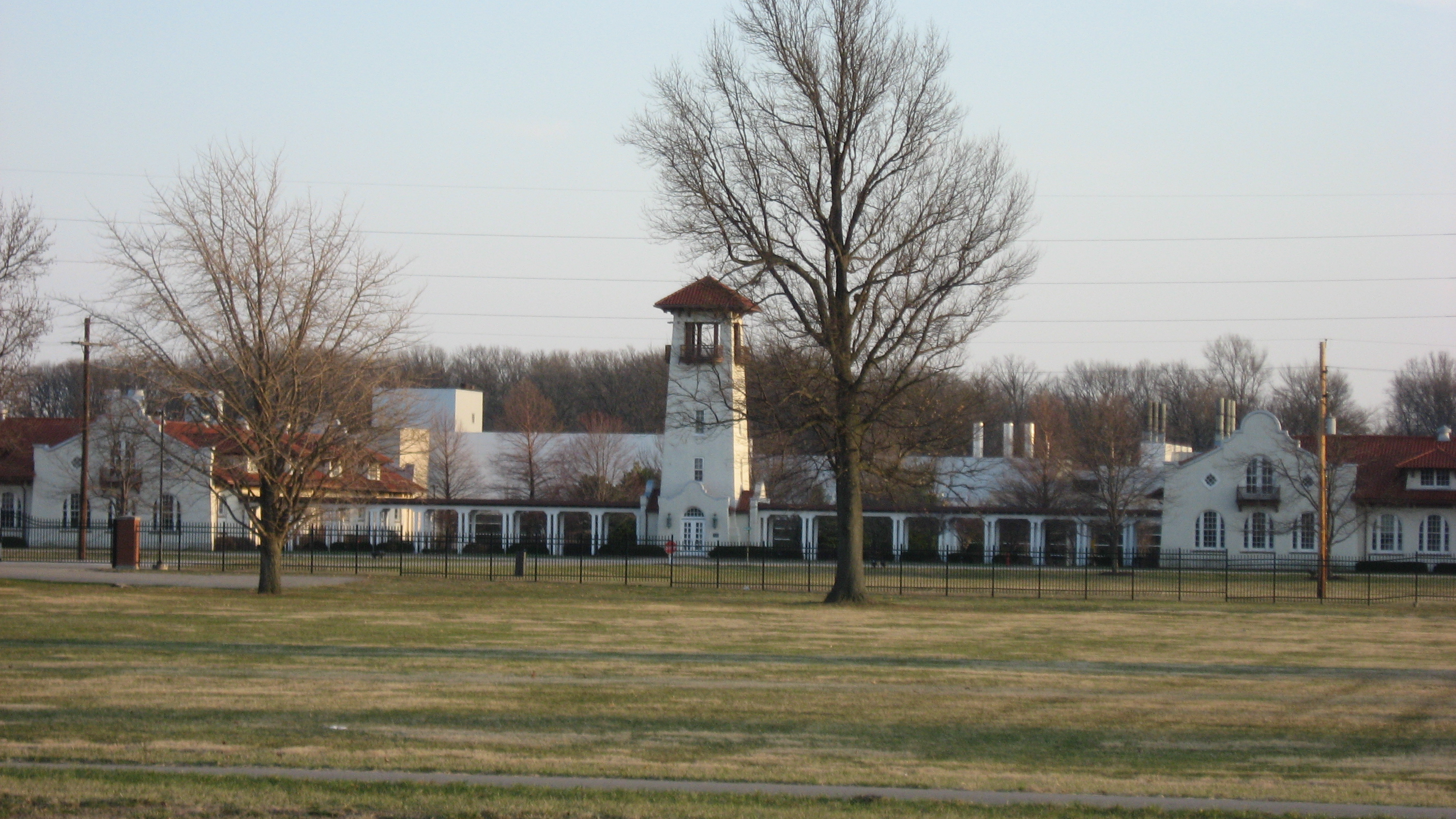
- Lilly Biological Laboratories, March 2011

- Location within Indiana Location within the United States
- Location: West of Greenfield off U.S. Route 40, Greenfield, Indiana, U.S.
- Coordinates: 39°46′51″N 85°47′51″W
- Area: 2.5 acres (1.0 ha)
- Built: 1913-1914
- Architect: Daggett, Robert Frost
- Architectural style: Mission/spanish Revival
- NRHP reference No.: 77000016
- Added to NRHP: November 23, 1977

Lilly Biological Laboratories, also known as Eli Lilly and Company and Greenfield Laboratories, is a historic laboratory complex located in Greenfield, Indiana. The laboratory was designed by Robert Frost Daggett and built in 1913-1914 for Eli Lilly and Company.

The complex consists of three buildings: the Tower Building flanked by two adjacent two-story buildings connected to the main building by pergolas. The buildings are in the Spanish Colonial Revival style with red tile roofs and arched openings. The Tower Building features a prominent 80-foot tall tower with five levels topped by a pyramidal red tile roof.

It was listed on the National Register of Historic Places in 1977.
