= Greenfield Courthouse Square Historic District =

Historic district in Indiana, United States

- U.S. National Register of Historic Places
- U.S. Historic district
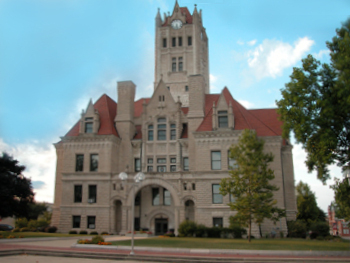
- Hancock County Courthouse, August 2004

- Location within Indiana Location within the United States
- Location: Roughly bounded by North, Hinchman, South and Pennsylvania Sts., Greenfield, Indiana
- Coordinates: 39°46′51″N 85°47′51″W
- Area: 21 acres (8.5 ha)
- Built: 1835
- Architect: Felt, John H.
- Architectural style: Late 19th And 20th Century Revivals, Late Victorian
- NRHP reference No.: 85000455
- Added to NRHP: March 7, 1985

Greenfield Courthouse Square Historic District is a national historic district located at Greenfield, Indiana, United States. The district encompasses 72 contributing buildings and 1 contributing object in the central business district of Greenfield that developed between about 1835 and 1935. The focal point of the district is the Romanesque Revival style Hancock County Courthouse (1896–1897) and Second Empire style jail. Other notable buildings are the Riley School (Greenfield High School, 1895), A.J. Banks Building / Morgan Building (1869), Randall Block (c. 1890), Christian Church (1895), Bradley Methodist Church (1902), First Presbyterian Church (1906–1907), Carnegie Library (1908–1909), Andrew Jackson Banks House (c. 1832, 1894–1895), D.H. Goble House (c. 1900), and Walpole House (c. 1835).

It was listed on the National Register of Historic Places in 1985.
