= Lincoln Park School (Greenfield, Indiana) =

- U.S. National Register of Historic Places
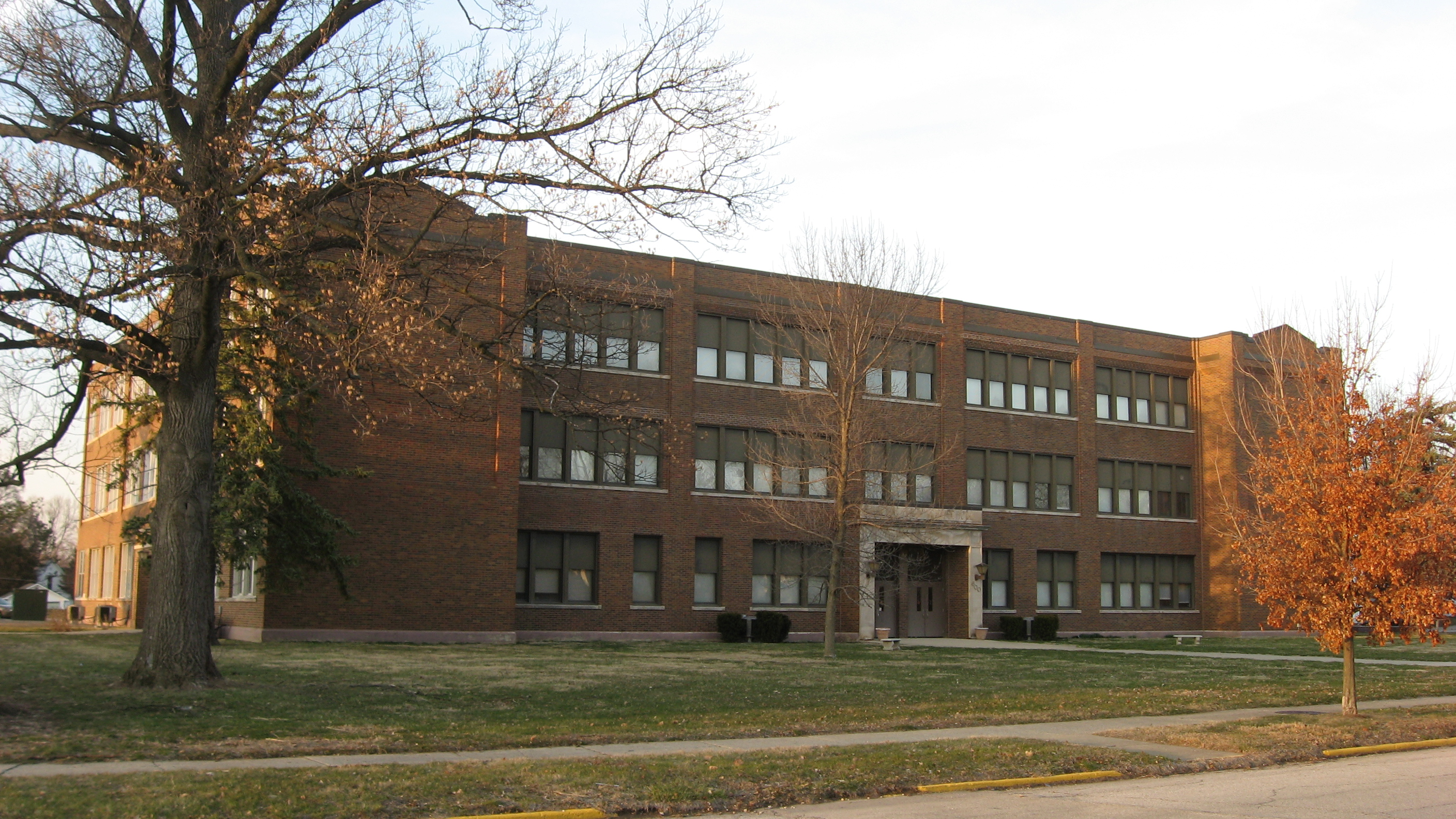
- Lincoln Park School, March 2011

- Location within Indiana Location within the United States
- Location: 600 W. N. St., Greenfield, Indiana
- Coordinates: 39°47′18″N 85°46′37″W
- Area: 2.5 acres (1.0 ha)
- Built: 1926, 1927
- Architect: Gordon, Omer; Dunkin, W.R. & Sons
- Architectural style: Classical Revival
- MPS: Indiana's Public Common and High Schools MPS
- NRHP reference No.: 09000424
- Added to NRHP: June 17, 2009

Lincoln Park School, also known as Lincoln Park Elementary School and Greenfield High School, is a historic school building located at Greenfield, Indiana. It was built in 1926, and is a three-story, Classical Revival style brick building. The front facade features a projecting entrance portico. Also on the property is a contributing gymnasium constructed in 1927.

It was listed on the National Register of Historic Places in 2009.
