= New Palestine School =

- Formerly listed on the U.S. National Register of Historic Places
- Location: Larrabee St. at jct. with Depot St., New Palestine, Indiana
- Area: 9 acres (3.6 ha)
- Architect: Garns, William Henry; Hickman, S.A.
- Architectural style: Classical Revival
- NRHP reference No.: 91000791

Significant dates
- Added to NRHP: June 14, 1991
- Removed from NRHP: March 17, 1992

New Palestine School was a historic school building located at New Palestine, Indiana. It was built in 1920, and was a two-story, Classical Revival style brick building. An addition was constructed in 1943. It has been demolished.

It was listed on the National Register of Historic Places in 1991 and delisted in 1992.
