= Charles Barr House =

Historic house in Indiana, United States

- U.S. National Register of Historic Places
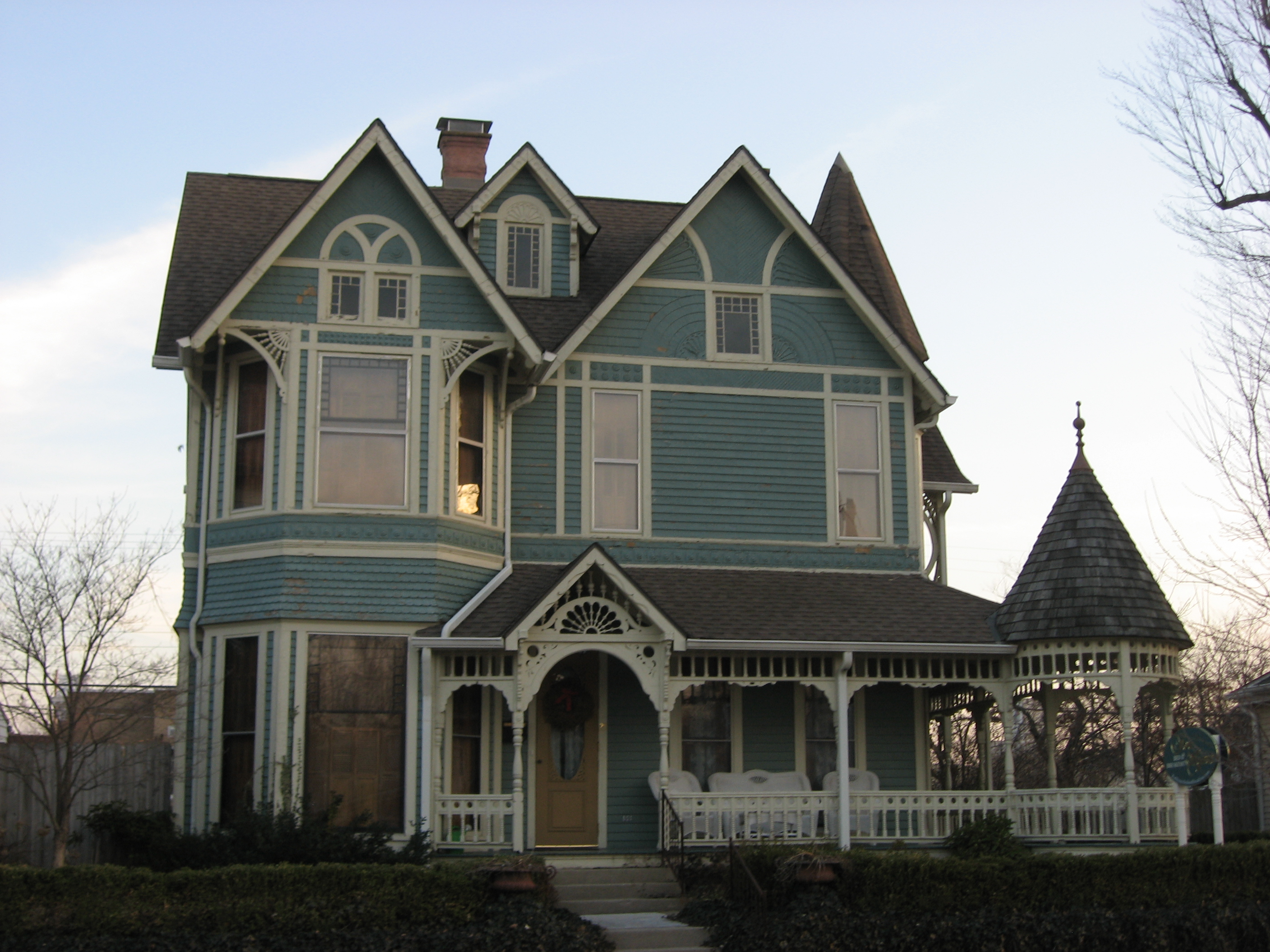
- Charles Barr House, March 2011

- Location within Indiana Location within the United States
- Location: 25 W. Walnut St., Greenfield, Indiana
- Coordinates: 39°47′20″N 85°46′14″W
- Area: less than one acre
- Built: 1893
- Architect: Felt, John; Powers, William
- Architectural style: Queen Anne
- NRHP reference No.: 08001208
- Added to NRHP: December 22, 2008

Charles Barr House is a historic home located at Greenfield, Indiana. It was built in 1893, and is a 2 1/2-story, Queen Anne style frame dwelling with a two-story rear wing. It sits on a brick foundation and has a steep gable roof. It features an elaborately detailed wraparound porch with a conical-roofed verandah.

It was listed on the National Register of Historic Places in 2008.
