= Greenfield, Indiana =

- City
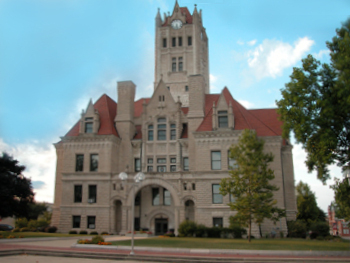
- Hancock County Courthouse in downtown Greenfield

- Flag Seal

- Location of Greenfield in Hancock County, Indiana.
- Coordinates: 39°47′41″N 85°45′25″W
- Country: United States
- State: Indiana
- County: Hancock
- Townships: Center, Brandywine
- Founded: 1828
- Incorporated (town): 1850
- Incorporated (city): 1876

Government
  - Type: Mayor–council government
  - Mayor: Guy Titus (R)

Area
  - Total: 13.71 sq mi (35.50 km^{2})
  - Land: 13.56 sq mi (35.12 km^{2})
  - Water: 0.15 sq mi (0.38 km^{2})
- Elevation: 889 ft (271 m)

Population (2020)
  - Total: 23,488
  - Density: 1,713.2/sq mi (661.5/km^{2})
- Time zone: UTC-5 (EST)
  - Summer (DST): UTC-4 (EDT)
- ZIP code: 46140
- Area code: 317
- FIPS code: 18-29520
- GNIS feature ID: 2394986
- Website: www.greenfieldin.gov

Greenfield is a city in and the county seat of Hancock County, Indiana, United States. It lies in Center and Brandywine townships and is part of the Indianapolis metropolitan area. The population was 23,488 at the 2020 census.

Greenfield was a stop along the Pittsburgh, Cincinnati, Chicago and St. Louis Railroad that connected Pittsburgh to Chicago and St. Louis.

== History ==
Hancock County was created on March 1, 1828, and named for John Hancock, the first person to sign the Declaration of Independence. The town of Greenfield was chosen as the county seat on April 11, 1828. The Commissioners announced, "The seat of Justice of Hancock County shall be known and designated by the name and title of Greenfield." The population of the county at that time was 400.

Early settlers built along the two creeks which flow south through Center Township, which includes Greenfield. The first businesses were small gristmills for grinding corn and wheat for settlers.

U.S. Route 40, the National Road, was built through Hancock County around 1835. It was heavily traveled by wagon trains going west and livestock going to Cincinnati. In 1851, the first steam railroad was completed by the Indiana Central Railroad at the south edge of Greenfield. The railroad became part of the Pennsylvania Railroad system and later the Penn-Central. These tracks were removed in the 1980s.

Greenfield was incorporated as a town shortly after the railroad was completed in 1851. Greenfield's population continued to grow and Greenfield was incorporated as a city in 1876 with a population of 2,023.

The greatest single period of growth began in 1887 when natural gas was discovered in the area. Greenfield was a boomtown for 20 years, with the founding of manufacturing plants and other industries.

A statue of James Whitcomb Riley, which stands in front of the Hancock County Courthouse, was erected in 1918. It was purchased with money donated by school children from all over the United States. Each year, during the Riley Festival in October, the city's school children parade to the statue to place flowers around it.

The Charles Barr House, Greenfield Courthouse Square Historic District, Greenfield Residential Historic District, Lilly Biological Laboratories, Lincoln Park School, and James Whitcomb Riley House are listed on the National Register of Historic Places.

== Geography ==
Greenfield is located in central Hancock County. U.S. Route 40 passes through the center of the city as Main Street, and leads east 13 miles (21 km) to Knightstown and west 21 miles (34 km) to downtown Indianapolis. Interstate 70 parallels US-40, passing through the northern limits of Greenfield with access from Exit 104. I-70 leads east 50 miles (80 km) to Richmond near the Ohio border and west through Indianapolis 99 miles (159 km) to Terre Haute. Indiana State Road 9 (State Street) crosses US-40 in the center of Greenfield and leads north 15 miles (24 km) to Pendleton and south 18 miles (29 km) to Shelbyville.

According to the 2010 census, Greenfield has a total area of 12.662 square miles (32.79 km^{2}), of which 12.55 square miles (32.50 km^{2}) (or 99.12%) is land and 0.112 square miles (0.29 km^{2}) (or 0.88%) is water.

Located on the east side of historic downtown lies Riley Park, in which flows the Brandywine Creek, a south-flowing tributary of the Big Blue River and part of the watershed of the East Fork White River.

=== Climate ===
Climate data for Greenfield, Indiana (1991–2020 normals, extremes 1903–present)
| Month | Jan | Feb | Mar | Apr | May | Jun | Jul | Aug | Sep | Oct | Nov | Dec | Year |
|---|---|---|---|---|---|---|---|---|---|---|---|---|---|
| Record high °F (°C) | 72 (22) | 76 (24) | 86 (30) | 91 (33) | 96 (36) | 106 (41) | 109 (43) | 104 (40) | 103 (39) | 93 (34) | 81 (27) | 72 (22) | 109 (43) |
| Mean daily maximum °F (°C) | 34.8 (1.6) | 39.0 (3.9) | 49.6 (9.8) | 62.3 (16.8) | 72.5 (22.5) | 81.2 (27.3) | 84.3 (29.1) | 83.1 (28.4) | 77.6 (25.3) | 65.1 (18.4) | 51.1 (10.6) | 39.3 (4.1) | 61.7 (16.5) |
| Daily mean °F (°C) | 26.7 (−2.9) | 30.2 (−1.0) | 39.8 (4.3) | 51.6 (10.9) | 62.3 (16.8) | 71.2 (21.8) | 74.2 (23.4) | 72.7 (22.6) | 66.2 (19.0) | 54.0 (12.2) | 41.9 (5.5) | 31.7 (−0.2) | 51.9 (11.0) |
| Mean daily minimum °F (°C) | 18.5 (−7.5) | 21.5 (−5.8) | 29.9 (−1.2) | 40.8 (4.9) | 52.1 (11.2) | 61.2 (16.2) | 64.1 (17.8) | 62.3 (16.8) | 54.8 (12.7) | 42.9 (6.1) | 32.6 (0.3) | 24.1 (−4.4) | 42.1 (5.6) |
| Record low °F (°C) | −29 (−34) | −19 (−28) | −6 (−21) | 16 (−9) | 27 (−3) | 35 (2) | 45 (7) | 40 (4) | 24 (−4) | 15 (−9) | −2 (−19) | −19 (−28) | −29 (−34) |
| Average precipitation inches (mm) | 3.29 (84) | 2.58 (66) | 3.65 (93) | 4.72 (120) | 5.29 (134) | 5.69 (145) | 4.75 (121) | 3.73 (95) | 3.71 (94) | 3.47 (88) | 3.67 (93) | 3.22 (82) | 47.77 (1,215) |
| Average snowfall inches (cm) | 7.4 (19) | 5.4 (14) | 1.8 (4.6) | 0.1 (0.25) | 0.0 (0.0) | 0.0 (0.0) | 0.0 (0.0) | 0.0 (0.0) | 0.0 (0.0) | 0.0 (0.0) | 0.7 (1.8) | 4.8 (12) | 20.2 (51.65) |
Source: NOAA

== Demographics ==
Historical population
| Census | Pop. | Note | %± |
|---|---|---|---|
| 1850 | 420 | | — |
| 1860 | 744 | | 77.1% |
| 1870 | 1,203 | | 61.7% |
| 1880 | 2,013 | | 67.3% |
| 1890 | 3,100 | | 54.0% |
| 1900 | 4,489 | | 44.8% |
| 1910 | 4,448 | | −0.9% |
| 1920 | 4,168 | | −6.3% |
| 1930 | 4,188 | | 0.5% |
| 1940 | 4,821 | | 15.1% |
| 1950 | 6,159 | | 27.8% |
| 1960 | 9,049 | | 46.9% |
| 1970 | 9,986 | | 10.4% |
| 1980 | 11,288 | | 13.0% |
| 1990 | 11,657 | | 3.3% |
| 2000 | 14,600 | | 25.2% |
| 2010 | 20,602 | | 41.1% |
| 2020 | 23,488 | | 14.0% |
U.S. Decennial Census

=== 2020 census ===
As of the 2020 census, Greenfield had a population of 23,488. The median age was 39.0 years. 22.9% of residents were under the age of 18 and 18.2% of residents were 65 years of age or older. For every 100 females there were 91.7 males, and for every 100 females age 18 and over there were 88.0 males age 18 and over.

99.1% of residents lived in urban areas, while 0.9% lived in rural areas.

There were 9,576 households in Greenfield, of which 30.1% had children under the age of 18 living in them. Of all households, 44.9% were married-couple households, 16.8% were households with a male householder and no spouse or partner present, and 30.4% were households with a female householder and no spouse or partner present. About 29.9% of all households were made up of individuals and 13.6% had someone living alone who was 65 years of age or older.

There were 10,074 housing units, of which 4.9% were vacant. The homeowner vacancy rate was 1.1% and the rental vacancy rate was 6.3%.

Racial composition as of the 2020 census
| Race | Number | Percent |
|---|---|---|
| White | 21,643 | 92.1% |
| Black or African American | 275 | 1.2% |
| American Indian and Alaska Native | 33 | 0.1% |
| Asian | 182 | 0.8% |
| Native Hawaiian and Other Pacific Islander | 12 | 0.1% |
| Some other race | 238 | 1.0% |
| Two or more races | 1,105 | 4.7% |
| Hispanic or Latino (of any race) | 620 | 2.6% |

=== 2010 census ===
As of the census of 2010, there were 20,602 people, 7,983 households, and 5,382 families living in the city. The population density was 1,641.6 inhabitants per square mile (633.8/km^{2}). There were 8,818 housing units at an average density of 702.6 per square mile (271.3/km^{2}). The racial makeup of the city was 96.6% White, 0.6% African American, 0.3% Native American, 0.8% Asian, 0.4% from other races, and 1.3% from two or more races. Hispanic or Latino of any race were 1.8% of the population.

There were 7,983 households, of which 36.8% had children under the age of 18 living with them, 49.2% were married couples living together, 12.8% had a female householder with no husband present, 5.4% had a male householder with no wife present, and 32.6% were non-families. 26.8% of all households were made up of individuals, and 10.8% had someone living alone who was 65 years of age or older. The average household size was 2.51 and the average family size was 3.04.

The median age in the city was 35.6 years. 26.4% of residents were under the age of 18; 8% were between the ages of 18 and 24; 28.7% were from 25 to 44; 23% were from 45 to 64; and 14% were 65 years of age or older. The gender makeup of the city was 48.1% male and 51.9% female.

=== 2000 census ===
As of the census of 2000, there were 14,600 people, 5,917 households, and 4,017 families living in the city. The population density was 1,818.0 inhabitants per square mile (701.9/km^{2}). There were 6,449 housing units at an average density of 803.0 per square mile (310.0/km^{2}). The racial makeup of the city was 98.23% White, 0.05% African American, 0.21% Native American, 0.53% Asian, 0.01% Pacific Islander, 0.33% from other races, and 0.64% from two or more races. Hispanic or Latino of any race were 1.27% of the population.

There were 5,917 households, out of which 32.8% had children under the age of 18 living with them, 53.4% were married couples living together, 10.7% had a female householder with no husband present, and 32.1% were non-families. 27.4% of all households were made up of individuals, and 10.9% had someone living alone who was 65 years of age or older. The average household size was 2.41 and the average family size was 2.93.

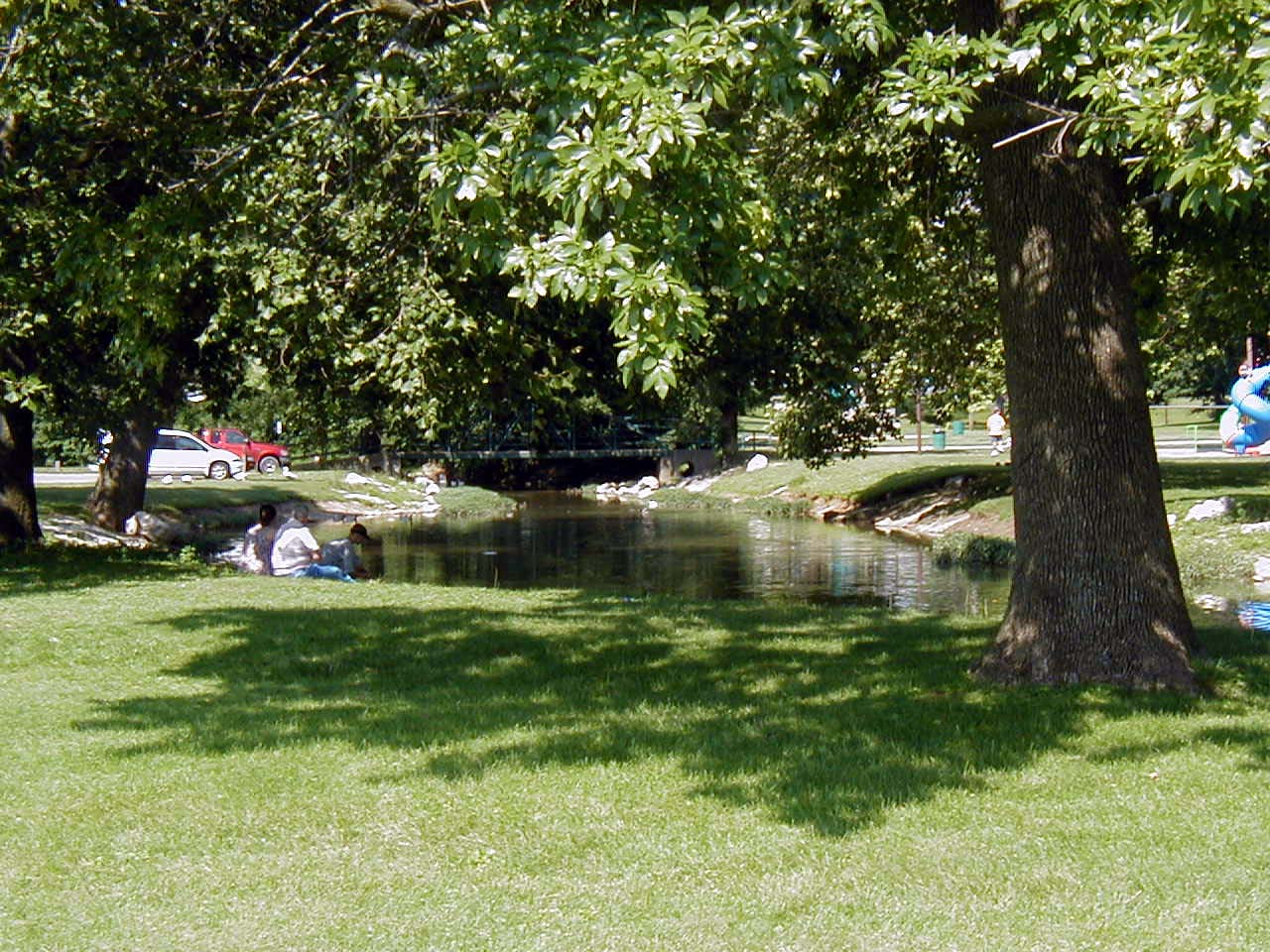
"The Old Swimming Hole" that appears in James Whitcomb Riley's poems is now a large and well-used park on the east side of Greenfield.

In the city, the population was spread out, with 25.2% under the age of 18, 8.6% from 18 to 24, 30.9% from 25 to 44, 21.0% from 45 to 64, and 14.3% who were 65 years of age or older. The median age was 35 years. For every 100 females, there were 92.3 males. For every 100 females age 18 and over, there were 87.6 males.

The median income for a household in the city was $72,035, and the median income for a family was $82,408. Males had a median income of $66,188 versus $56,568 for females. The per capita income for the city was $52,509. About 3.0% of families and 4.3% of the population were below the poverty line, including 4.7% of those under age 18 and 6.2% of those age 65 or over.

== Government ==
The government consists of a mayor and a city council. The mayor is elected in citywide vote. The city council consists of seven members. Five are elected from individual districts. Two are elected at-large.

== Education ==
Greenfield-Central Community School Corporation services the city of Greenfield and surrounding areas in central Hancock County. It consists of four elementary schools (Grades K - 3), two intermediate schools (Grades 4 - 6), one junior high school (Grades 7 - 8), and one high school (Grades 9 - 12). Greenfield Central Jr. High School was built in the late 2000s to accommodate Greenfield's rapidly growing population. Greenfield-Central High School also underwent renovation in 2011 and 2022.

List of schools - Greenfield-Central Community School Corporation

- Eden Elementary School
- Harris Elementary School
- J.B. Stephens Elementary School
- Weston Elementary School
- Greenfield Intermediate School
- Maxwell Intermediate School
- Greenfield Central Jr. High School
- Greenfield-Central High School

St. Michael's School also serves Greenfield, offering Pre-kindergarten through Grade 8. It is a private Catholic School that won the Blue Ribbon Award and has a student-teacher ratio of 8:1.

Greenfield has a public library, a branch of the Hancock County Public Library.

== Industry and commerce ==
Businesses with headquarters and/or significant operations in Greenfield include:

- Avery Dennison: manufactures a variety of adhesive labels and adhesive backed films.
- Elanco: manufactures animal health products for pets and farm animals, such as pet medicines and feed additives. Formerly a division of Eli Lilly and Company, the company's global headquarters facility is located in Greenfield.
- Fortrea: engaged in research, development, and testing of pharmaceutical products. This facility was operated by Eli Lilly and Company until 2008.
- Hancock Regional Hospital is a full-service community hospital with a focus on primary care, patient comfort, and convenience.
- Hitachi Astemo: manufactures automotive components including intake manifolds, solenoid valves, and throttle bodies. Formerly Keihin IPT Manufacturing, LLC, the company's Greenfield plant is primarily a supplier to Honda Motor.
- Indiana Automotive Fasteners: manufactures fasteners for automotive OEMs including Toyota, Ford and Honda.
- Stanley Black & Decker: manufacture[s] industrial fasteners, various types of steel fasteners and industrial applications equipment and will assemble pneumatic tools.
- Yamaha Motor Company: manufactures stainless steel propellers used in outboard marine engines.

== Sister and friendship cities ==
Greenfield is currently in a sister city relationship with Kakuda, Miyagi Prefecture, Japan. Each year, a small group of high school students from Greenfield and Kakuda are chosen to travel to each sister city, respectively, and will stay with a host family for ten days, most expenses paid, thanks to local donations. The sister city program began in 1990 and continues today.

== Notable people ==
- Adelia Pope Branham (1861–1917), writer
- Mark Dismore, Indy Racing League and Indianapolis 500 driver
- Cameron Dodson (1988–2021), racing driver
- Yogi Ferrell, former Indiana basketball player and current Budućnost player
- Kyle Gibson, pitcher 22nd overall pick in 2009 Major League Baseball draft
- Henry C. Gooding, Indiana State Senator and Arizona Territorial Supreme Court Justice
- Omer Stokes Jackson, 28th Indiana Attorney General
- Jaycie Phelps, member of US Women's gold medalist 1996 Olympic gymnastic team
- James Whitcomb Riley, poet and writer
- Will Vawter, artist
- Drey Jameson, Arizona Diamondbacks Pitcher, 34th overall pick in 2019 Major League Baseball draft
- Braylon Mullins, Greenfield-Central's first 5-star recruit and UConn men's basketball star
- Lane Wadle, Greenfield-Central's first ever graduate to receive a scholarship to play football at a FBS Division 1 school and current TE at Georgia State University

== Events ==
Each year in October, the city of Greenfield hosts the Riley Festival, commonly known as "Riley Days." The intersection of State Road 9 and US 40 is closed, and the downtown courthouse square is filled with vendors and exhibitors.

== Media ==
- Radio Station WRGF 89.7 FM
- Daily Reporter - daily newspaper
