= Riley Birthplace and Museum =

Historic house in Indiana, United States

- James Whitcomb Riley House
- U.S. National Register of Historic Places
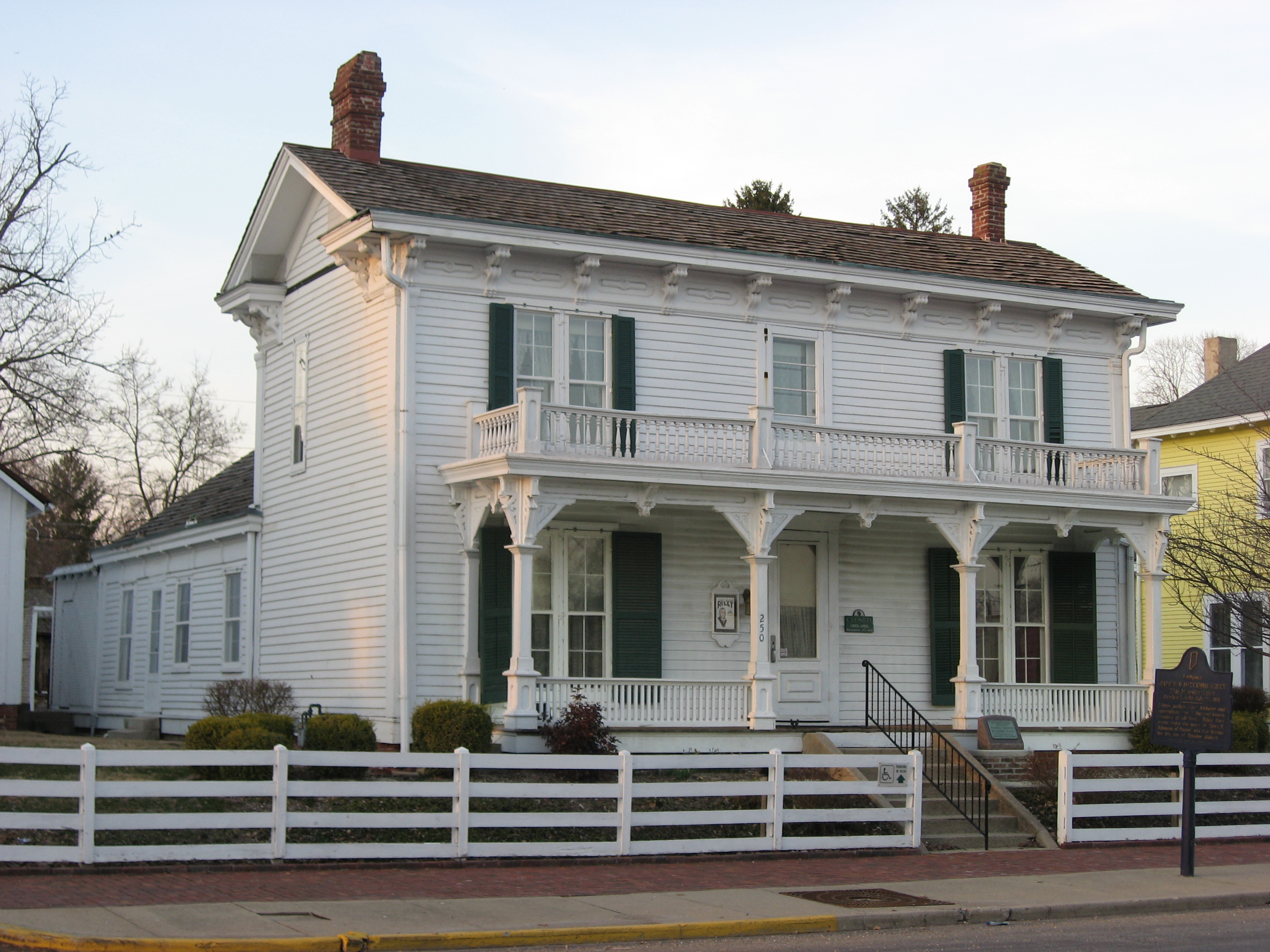
- Front and western side of the house

- Location within Indiana Location within the United States
- Location: 250 W. Main St., Greenfield, Indiana
- Coordinates: 39°47′6.5″N 85°46′24″W
- Area: less than one acre
- Built: 1847
- Architect: Riley, A. Reuben
- Architectural style: Italian Villa
- NRHP reference No.: 77000017
- Added to NRHP: September 28, 1977

The Riley Birthplace and Museum, one of two homes called the James Whitcomb Riley House on the National Register of Historic Places, is located at 250 West Main Street in Greenfield, Indiana, twenty miles (32 km) east of downtown Indianapolis.

== History ==
The Riley Birthplace and Museum marks where noted Hoosier poet James Whitcomb Riley was born and lived during his boyhood. The house was built by the author's father Reuben Riley, a local attorney in 1850, and Greenfield's first mayor. Riley was not actually born in the house, but a cabin on the site of the property (October 7, 1849). Reuben Riley saw that his cabin was not large enough for all five members of his family, so he worked on the house for three years, often cannibalized the cabin to make improvements on the house during its construction; the winding stairway to the second floor best typifies this cannibalization.

Although it was along the National Road, the residence was described as being near many woodland animals, but very few people. The front porch had two doors. The left led into the family parlor, while the right door led to Reuben Riley's law office. The influx of visitors to Reuben Riley's office gave James Whitcomb Riley a chance to learn how to entertain several people at a time with speeches and tales, as his father had. Visitors such as a ragged man and an orphan girl, Mary Alice Smith (Little Orphant Annie), inspired James Whitcomb Riley to write the poems he would later tell in his adulthood. Reuben had organized a militia of Greenfield residents during the American Civil War. However, his involvement with the War hurt his law career, forcing him to sell the house in 1870. In 1893 James Whitcomb Riley bought the house, but kept his residence in Indianapolis, at what is today James Whitcomb Riley Museum Home. Although James Whitcomb Riley never again lived in Greenfield house, his brother John and John's wife resided there; James would often visit them. It was on one of these visits in 1898 that James Whitcomb Riley called Greenfield "the best town outside of Heaven".

Before his death in 1916, Riley wrote over 1000 poems, including "Little Orphant Annie", "When the Frost is on the Punkin", and "The Bear Story". During his time, he was regarded as more important than Mark Twain.

The city of Greenfield bought the property in 1936, creating the Riley Old Home Society to run the property.

It was listed on the National Register of Historic Places in 1977.

== Today ==
The Riley home is now operated as a museum by the Riley Old Home Society and the City of Greenfield, through the Greenfield Parks and Recreation Department. The museum is open to visitors, several thousand a year, from April through November, usually closed for the winter. An adjacent home, the Mitchell House, was where James Whitcomb Riley's poem publisher John Mitchell lived. Mitchell's former domicile is used as a museum, allowing for Riley's home to be kept as it would have looked like during his time of residence.

The garden behind the Riley house is frequently enjoyed by visitors during the seasons of spring and summer. Since 1991 this garden has been developed and maintained by the Greenfield Herb Society.

An annual festival celebrating James Whitcomb Riley's connection with Greenfield is celebrated in first Thursday through Sunday in October.

The Riley house is located along the old National Road, which is now U.S. Route 40.
