= Indianapolis Airport (disambiguation) =

Indianapolis Airport may refer to airports around Indianapolis, Indiana:

- Indianapolis Executive Airport (FAA: TYQ; ICAO: KTYQ), Boone County, Indiana, United States
- Indianapolis International Airport (IATA: IND; ICAO: KIND), Marion County, Indiana, United States
- Indianapolis Metropolitan Airport (FAA: UMP; ICAO: KUMP), Hamilton County, Indiana, United States
- Indianapolis Regional Airport (FAA: MQJ; ICAO: KMQJ), Hancock County, Indiana, United States
- Indianapolis Downtown Heliport (FAA: 8A4), Indianapolis, Marion County, Indiana, United States
- Indianapolis Airport Authority, Indianapolis, Indiana, United States
