= Greenlawn Cemetery (Indianapolis, Indiana) =

Defunct cemetery in Marion County, Indiana

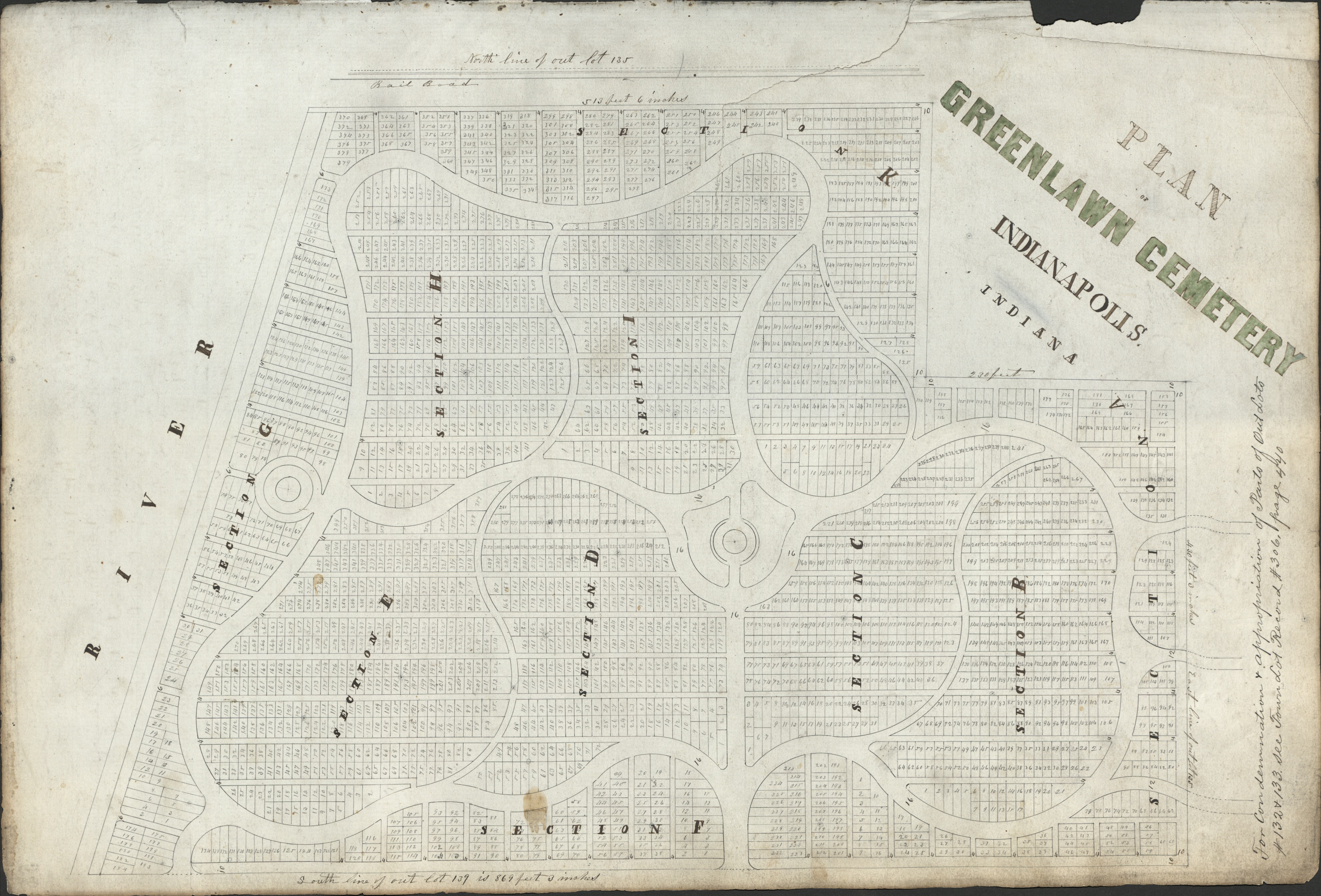
- Map showing conceptual design of Greenlawn Cemetery, from the Marion County Assessor's plat book, 1857-1864
- Interactive map of Greenlawn Cemetery

Details
- Established: 1821
- Abandoned: 1931
- Location: Indianapolis, Indiana
- Country: United States
- Coordinates: 39.7599°N 86.1704°W
- Type: Public
- Find a Grave: Greenlawn Cemetery

Greenlawn Cemetery was the collective name of the first four public burying grounds in Indianapolis, Indiana, that operated from 1821 to 1931. It was located along the White River just north of what would later become Kentucky Avenue. The burying grounds acted as the initial burial place for some of the first Indianapolis settlers as well as Union and Confederate soldiers who died in Indianapolis. The cemetery was closed to new burials and many of the bodies were relocated after 1890 due to vandalism, grave robbing, overcrowding, encroaching industrialization, and the regular flooding of the White River. Human remains from the old cemetery that had not been relocated were rediscovered in the area during the construction of Eleven Park and the Henry Street bridge, having been concealed by above ground industrialization for several decades.

== History ==
Greenlawn Cemetery was developed in 1821 due to increased death rates caused by malaria outbreaks and flooding in the Indianapolis area. Alexander Ralston, the Scottish-American surveyor who had designed Indianapolis with the help of four early citizens of Indianapolis (James M. Ray, James Blake, Daniel Shaffer, and Matthias Nowland) mapped out a cemetery in the original city plans on a four-acre (1.6 ha) plot beyond the southwest end of Kentucky Avenue and near the White River. At the time, this graveyard was known as the Old Burying Ground. Other cemeteries were added around the original plot over the next 40 years. These surrounding cemeteries were known as the New Burying Ground, also known as the Union Cemetery, (added in 1834), the North Burying Ground (added in 1852), and, finally, the Greenlawn Cemetery (added in 1860). All of these interconnected cemeteries ultimately coalesced into the 25-acre (10 ha) graveyard known as the Greenlawn Cemetery.

Schaffer and Nowland, two of the men who had helped select the site of the Old Burying Ground, were among the first Indianapolis residents interred at the city cemetery. Schaffer died only a week after the site had been picked in 1821 and Nowland died a year later. Black and white residents of Indianapolis alike were buried in the Greenlawn Cemetery, but there is known to have been a segregated section with the remains of Black residents located at the far west end. Alexander Ralston bought a plot of land for himself and his employee, Cheney Lively, who is believed to be Indianapolis's first permanent Black resident and the first Black property owner in the city. Ralston himself was buried in the Old Burying Grounds after his death in 1827, but there was an attempt to move his remains to Crown Hill Cemetery by the public. According to the Indianapolis Locomotive in reference to the Old Burying Grounds, "The old ground was laid out on the foundation of the city, and has been used ever since, graves being dug promiscuously, according to the selections made by the friends of the deceased."

The New Burying Ground was a six-acre (2.4 ha) lot added to the east of the Old Burying Grounds in 1834. It was modeled after the New Haven Burying Ground in Connecticut. The Indianapolis Locomotive newspaper claimed that this new burying ground was "beautifully laid out" and organized into lots that families were able to buy. In the 1830s, headstones were mostly made up of simply carved stone and marble tablets; however, grave markers evolved to be more elaborate in the cemetery after the economic boom that followed the construction of the Madison, Indianapolis and Lafayette Railroad in 1847. With the new materials being brought into the city via the railroad, local stone yards began advertising finer imported stones for grave markers and Indianapolis undertakers such as Weaver and Williams started producing new styles of coffins for consumers. In 1852, Edwin J. Peck, president of the Terre Haute and Indianapolis Railway Company, added the North Burying Grounds on a seven-acre (2.8 ha) plot of land with over 250 sections. Finally, the final addition to the collection of graveyard plots was named Greenlawn Cemetery in 1860, a name which became applied to all four burying grounds.

At the time of the American Civil War (1861–1864), Indianapolis was still burying most of the city's dead in Greenlawn, including Union soldiers who died in camps and hospitals near the city. During the war, when the city served as a major transportation hub and as a camp for Union troops, the soldiers who died at Indianapolis were initially buried at Greenlawn Cemetery. Confederate prisoners who died at Camp Morton, a large prisoner-of-war camp north of Indianapolis, were also interred at Greenlawn, but their remains were placed on a strip of land along the Vandalia tracks purchased by the government. By August 1863 Greenlawn was nearing capacity from wartime casualties and facing encroachment from industrial development. To provide additional land for burials, a group of local businessmen formed a board of corporators (trustees) that established Crown Hill Cemetery. That privately owned cemetery, dedicated on June 1, 1864, to the northwest of downtown, borders present-day 38th Street.

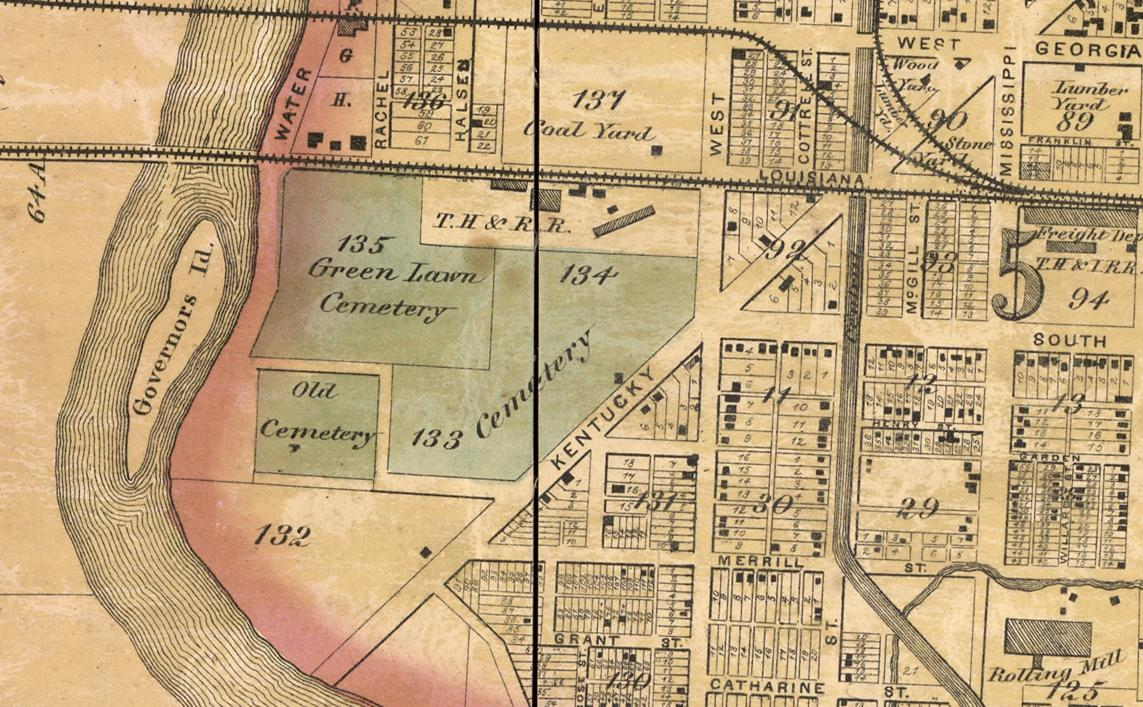
Map of Greenlawn Cemetery, 1866

In 1866, the U.S. government authorized a National Cemetery for Indianapolis in Section 10 of Crown Hill and made arrangements for the removal of the soldiers from Greenlawn. Within a few months the bodies of the Union soldiers buried at Greenlawn had been moved to the National Cemetery. On October 19, 1866, the remains of Matthew Quigley, a former member of Company A, Thirteenth Regiment, became the first of several hundred Union soldiers from Greenlawn to be interred at Crown Hill. By November 1866, the bodies of 707 Union soldiers had been moved from Greenlawn to Crown Hill. In 1870, the Confederate remains were moved from along the Vandalia tracks to deeper in Greenlawn Cemetery in order to create room for the Vandalia Railroad to build new tracks and an engine house. In 1931 industrial development around Greenlawn Cemetery required the remains of the 1,616 Confederate prisoners to be moved to Crown Hill, where they were interred in a mass grave known as the Confederate Mound in Section 32 of Crown Hill.

The movement of buried dead was not uncommon in early American history. Crown Hill Cemetery utilized the idea of a permanent resting place in their advertisements as a sales tool to attract potential buyers to their plots. Several of the individuals buried in Greenlawn were later moved to Crown Hill, including Indiana governors Noah Noble and James Whitcomb.

On December 11, 1889, the Indianapolis Sun described Greenlawn Cemetery as "one of the most dilapidated cemeteries in the state" with fallen tombstones and unkempt bushes hiding the grave markers of those interred. The newspaper article went on to describe the surrounding infrastructure's effect on the cemetery's atmosphere, including noise pollution created by the trains along Kentucky Avenue and the Evansville and Terre Haute locomotive roundhouse. The area also suffered from odors created by a smokehouse, powder mills, and a fruit house. In the 1870s there was also a pork slaughterhouse that bordered the north side of Greenlawn.

== Closure ==
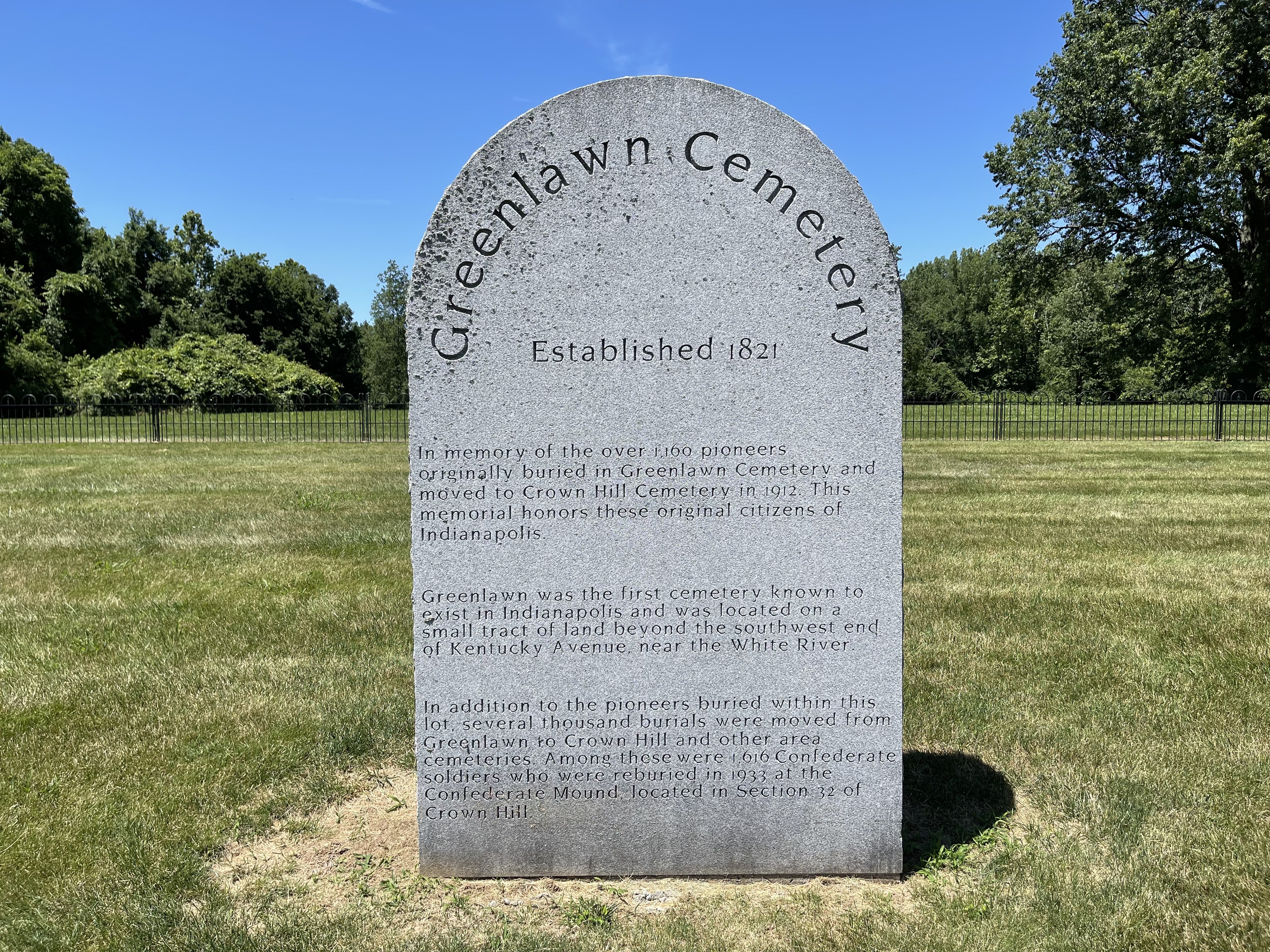
Greenlawn is memorialized in the Pioneer Cemetery section of Crown Hill Cemetery, pictured in 2022.

General Ordinance, No. 15, 1890, passed by the Indianapolis Common Council on March 21, 1890, closed Greenlawn Cemetery to all new ground or vault burials. Those who defied this ordinance could have been fined up to $100. In the 1890s, Greenlawn was in a poor state as a result of overcrowding, vandalism, and surrounding industrialization making it a less-than-ideal burying ground. However, with Greenlawn's closure there also came a fear of inequity for lower income plot purchasers due to Crown Hill's higher plot prices. Bodies were being relocated by families with the financial means, the government, and the heirs of Edwin J. Peck (owners of the North Burying Ground) to plots in Crown Hill Cemetery, Floral Park Cemetery, and Holy Cross Cemetery. During the relocation process, it was discovered that some of the graves had been robbed at some point, with the bodies being stolen, likely for use as subjects for examination and dissection at area medical schools.

While many of the bodies were said to have been removed, an indeterminate number remained and there were still plots owned by living purchasers. After the cemetery's closure, there were also legal discussions about turning the area into a park without reinterring the remaining bodies. When the city took over the section of Greenlawn that had been given by Peck, intending to make it a part of their plans for a Greenlawn Park, the Peck's heirs filed a suit for the land. The original contracts for Peck's section of Greenlawn stated that if the land ceased functioning as a cemetery, the property would be returned to Peck's heirs. The remaining bodies in this section were removed to Crown Hill by Peck's heirs.

== Site redevelopment ==
=== 20th century ===
In 1914, part of the cemetery was the site of the city's Federal League Park, used by the Hoosiers baseball team for the next year. The 25,000-seat baseball field was not utilized for long, with the league disbanding in 1915 and the ballpark closing in 1916. The land was then bought by the Indianapolis Traction Terminal Company to construct a freight depot to meet the increasing demands on Indianapolis terminal lines. In 1917, the Diamond Chain Company, a bike chain manufacturer, built an Indianapolis facility over parts of the Greenlawn cemetery at Kentucky Avenue and West Street. This section was originally the Peck Burying ground and was sold to Diamond Chain after the heirs of Edward J. Peck regained ownership of the land. During the building's construction, pieces of bones and gravestones were unearthed. In 1924, the freight depot continued to expand over the Old Burying Ground, leading to a need for more bodies to be removed from the site, the majority of which were reinterred in Floral Park Cemetery in Indianapolis. Over 1,800 of these remains were unidentified.

After the last major Greenlawn reinternment in 1931 consisting of 1,616 Confederate dead moved to Crown Hill Cemetery, the area was considered to be vacant of the last remnants of the cemetery. On October 3, 1931, the Indianapolis News front-page headline announced, "Removal of Confederate Dead from Old Greenlawn Cemetery to Crown Hill Spells Finis for 'The Little Graveyard by the River,' Shrine of Pioneers". However, construction and development in the area over the next several decades led to the continued discovery of human remains, including the unearthing of two graves under the Diamond Chain facility floor in 1999.

=== 21st century ===
In April 2019, Diamond Chain was acquired by the Timken Company, which subsequently closed the 102-year-old Indianapolis facility. In 2022, the site was purchased by Keystone Corporation for $7.6 million. The land was intended to be used for Eleven Park, which would include a new 20,000 seat soccer stadium for the Indy Eleven team as well as 600 apartments, a 200-room hotel, 100,000 square feet (9,300 m^{2}) of retail space, and 150,000 square feet (14,000 m^{2}) of office space. The Indianapolis Business Journal estimated that the project could cost up to $1 billion with the stadium making up $250 million of the total amount. This project and the city's Henry Street Bridge project, which was planned to be constructed over the Old Burying Ground and New Burying Ground of Greenlawn, led to controversy surrounding the ethics of developing over a poorly excavated and allegedly segregated graveyard.

Local Indianapolis historians opposed construction on the site of Greenlawn, especially on the allegedly segregated section that was designated for the Henry Street bridge project by the city. The segregated section along the bank of the White River was not well documented. Historians at Indiana Landmarks worried that this construction would further the erasure of Black history in Indianapolis and suggested adding the segregated section to the National Register of Historic Places based on their belief that it is the largest burial site of African Americans in Indiana. Leon Bates, a Ph.D. student in pan-African studies, and Eunice Trotter, the director of the Black Heritage Preservation Program at Indiana Landmarks, both advocates for the preservation of Greenlawn, acknowledged the unlikelihood of being able to keep such prime real estate in central Indianapolis undeveloped. As an alternative, Bates and Trotter pushed for an archaeological dig of the site before the continuance of construction so that remains could be moved prior to the disruption of the land. Brandon Herget, director of the city's Department of Public Works, stated that an archeological dig was not on the table for the site of Greenlawn Cemetery. Instead, the city wanted to have an archeologist on the site who would monitor for remains during construction.

On May 22, 2024, the Keystone Group announced that archaeologists had uncovered 87 burials as well as 82 individual bones or bone fragments in their first phase of construction on Eleven Park. Keystone planned on moving these remains to Mount Jackson Cemetery in Wayne Township along with any recovered artifacts for burial. Mayor Joe Hogsett suggested turning the site of Eleven Park into a memorial or park, and his office offered to purchase the 20-acre (8.1 ha) piece of land that once made up most of Greenlawn Cemetery from the Keystone Group. Keystone rejected the mayor's offer. With the controversy surrounding the Indy Eleven Park site, Hogsett pulled support from the Keystone Group Project in favor of a Major League Soccer Stadium to be built on the site of the Indianapolis Airport Authority's Heliport.

On June 3, 2024, the Indianapolis City-County Council voted to allow the creation of a "Professional Sports Development Area" that would fund the construction of a new soccer stadium in the location of the Indianapolis Airport Authority's Heliport on the east side of downtown, essentially pulling government support from the Eleven Park project. At that meeting, Councilor Dan Boots stated that "A professional sports league does not want to touch such a controversial issue with a 10-foot pole" in reference to Eleven Park's construction on the site of Greenlawn Cemetery. With the city's pursuit of a new location for the Major League Stadium, the construction of Eleven Park halted.

The Henry Street bridge project, which will connect the new Elanco headquarters to Kentucky Avenue over the White River, still maintained the city's support despite also being situated over parts of the cemetery. The Indianapolis Department of Public Works launched a website to provide the public with updates on the Henry Street bridge project and allow the public to submit their own research about the site's history.

On June 24, 2024, in a public meeting at the Edison School of the Arts in Indianapolis, Herget changed his stance on the matter of an archeological dig at the site of the Henry Street bridge project, saying that he had not previously appreciated the historical significance of Greenlawn Cemetery. The city, now planning on completing a full archeological dig prior to developing on the site, set aside $12 million for the excavation and reburial of remains found on the 1.4-acre (0.57 ha) site of the Henry Street bridge. The cost would have risked the planned architectural features of the bridge but a $15 million gift from the Lilly Endowment ensured that the dig could happen without any losses from the bridge's original design. While the archeological dig was underway, the city began construction on the other side of the White River between Oliver and Washington streets.

In October 2024, the archeological efforts led to the discovery of granite brickwork and railroad tracks that were at one time a section of Indianapolis's electric freight terminal before it was paved over in the 1920s. The city contracted with Canadian engineering company Stantec for aid in excavation efforts and, though slow dig work, they determined the number of grave shafts under the site. They also updated the website for the Henry Street bridge project periodically with new data in order to provide transparency to the public.

The human remains found were sent to Jeremy Wilson, a bioarcheologist and professor at Indiana University Indianapolis's School of Liberal Arts, for analysis. Wilson and his team were tasked with cleaning, cataloging, and developing biological profiles based on the features of the remains. By July 2025, they had documented and analyzed around 250 burials from the section of the cemetery owned by the city of Indianapolis for the development of the Henry Street bridge.

On July 8, 2025, the city held a public information meeting about the cemetery at the Edison School of the Arts. At this meeting, the city announced that, thus far in the city's archeological endeavors, they had discovered 1,136 grave shafts and 511 intact burials. There were found to be 300 burials with only pieces of the skeletal remains, indicating a previous incomplete attempt at relocation, and only 17 graves were found completely empty. The city owns only 1.5 acres (0.61 ha) of the defunct cemetery, spanning a portion of the Old Burying Ground and Union Cemetery sections of Greenlawn. At the time of th meeting, archeological work was still making its way through the Old Burying Grounds, which had previously undergone excavation and reinternment attempts in 1924. There is no documentation from the earlier attempts at the Union Cemetery. The excavation of the part of Greenlawn owned by the city was concluded in November 2026, with 1,709 grave shafts having been revealed. Over half of the grave shafts contained complete burials.

The development of the old Greenlawn site led to the creation of a paid internship called "Indiology" for high school students interested in archology as well as a traveling exhibit that included artwork by local Indianapolis artist Shaunt'e Lewis.

== Notable interments ==
- Noah Noble (1794–1844), Indiana's fifth governor
- Governor James Whitcomb (1795–1852), Indiana's eighth governor
- Cheney Lively (c. 1795–1857), the first Black property owner in Indianapolis
- Morrison Greathouse (1838–1877), great-great-grandfather of Muhammad Ali
