= Eleven Park =

Proposed soccer-specific stadium in Indianapolis, Indiana

- Conceptual Design of the stadium
- Interactive map of Eleven Park
- Address: 402 Kentucky Avenue; Indianapolis, Indiana; U.S.
- Coordinates: 39.76215°N 86.16989°W
- Owner: Capital Improvement Board of Managers of Marion County, Indiana
- Operator: Capital Improvement Board of Managers of Marion County, Indiana
- Capacity: 20,000
- Type: Soccer-specific stadium
- Surface: Grass
- Field shape: Rectangular

Construction
- Groundbreaking: May 31, 2023
- Opened: 2026 (planned)
- Cost: $1 billion (est.) (total project amt.)

Tenants
- Indy Eleven (USLC) (2026–present); Future USLS team (planned)

Website
- elevenpark.com

Eleven Park was a proposed soccer-specific stadium on the site of the former Diamond Chain Company facility in Indianapolis, Indiana, United States. If completed, it would be the home of Indy Eleven, a professional soccer team that plays in the USL Championship. The stadium would additionally house the team's women's team, who currently play in the USL W League and are anticipated to join the USL Super League at a later date.

The stadium would be part of a mixed-use development including a hotel, offices, apartments, and a retail area, and was initially expected to be completed by 2026. As of January 2026, construction of the stadium is in doubt following the City of Indianapolis' withdrawal of financial support.

== History ==
=== Initial plans ===
The first legislative proposal for an Indy Eleven stadium was in 2014, before the team had debuted. The plans called for a 18,500-seat stadium at the cost of $87 million. The plan was shelved in the Indiana Senate. In 2015, the proposal was revived, but rejected again in favor of renovating Michael A. Carroll Stadium, the home of the Eleven at the time. In 2017, the Eleven again attempted to receive stadium funding, but did not have a bill launched in favor of it.

In January 2019, the Eleven announced a new stadium plan, with a 20,000-seat stadium being the centerpiece of a $550 million mixed-use development including 600 apartments, more than 100,000 square feet (9,300 m^{2}) of retail space, 150,000 square feet (14,000 m^{2}) of office space, and a 200-room hotel. The stadium would also have the potential to host concerts, a women's soccer team, college and high school soccer, football, field hockey, rugby, and lacrosse.

In February 2019, the State Senate Appropriations Committee approved the bill, with a requirement that the Eleven reach an agreement to join Major League Soccer before the stadium could be built. In April, the bill passed the Indiana House of Representatives with the MLS requirement removed. The bill later passed the Indiana Senate, and was signed by Governor Eric Holcomb in late April 2019.

=== Location and construction ===
On June 24, 2022, the club announced that the stadium would be built on the site of the former Diamond Chain Company factory in the southwest quadrant of downtown Indianapolis.

A ceremonial groundbreaking was held on May 31, 2023, at the site of the future stadium, with demolition of the existing structures beginning immediately. Indy Eleven officials were joined by Indiana Governor Eric Holcomb and Indianapolis Mayor Joe Hogsett, who both spoke at the event.

On November 1, 2023, the Indianapolis Department of Metropolitan Development unanimously approved the creation of a special tax district of the area surrounding the site of the future stadium. The Indianapolis City-County Council unanimously approved the measure on November 20, 2023. The tax area will use a portion of state and local tax revenue to pay for related infrastructure costs. The full cost of the development along the White River is estimated to be over $1 billion and was anticipated to be completed in spring 2025. An article published by the USL Championship on April 12, 2024, updated the completion date to 2026.

On December 22, 2023, representatives for the Keystone Construction Group announced that human remains had been discovered during excavation on the north end of the site. The former Greenlawn Cemetery occupied a large portion of the stadium site in the late 19th century, and decades of development on the site had made it difficult to identify the locations of possible human remains. Keystone Group stated that they are working with the Indiana Department of Natural Resources to appropriately care for any discovered human remains and pledged that a memorial to those buried in the former cemetery would be included in the development process.

=== Mayoral MLS bid and stadium doubts ===
While construction of the stadium was tied to an application for an MLS team, on April 25, 2024, Indianapolis Mayor Joe Hogsett announced that he had been speaking with MLS commissioner Don Garber about bringing an expansion team in the city. Indy Eleven, as well as stadium developer Keystone Group, were not made aware of this fact or involved the process, which places this club's future in doubt. Keystone Group issued a statement on the same day accusing the mayoral administration of "preparing to walk away" from the stadium deal, which Hogsett's office later denied, stating that a proposal was made between Keystone and Indy Eleven but not the city. This is despite the fact that Hogsett himself attended the groundbreaking of the site in May 2023, which officials said was not a city endorsement of the project.
