= Eagle Creek Airpark =

Airport in Indianapolis, Indiana, U.S.

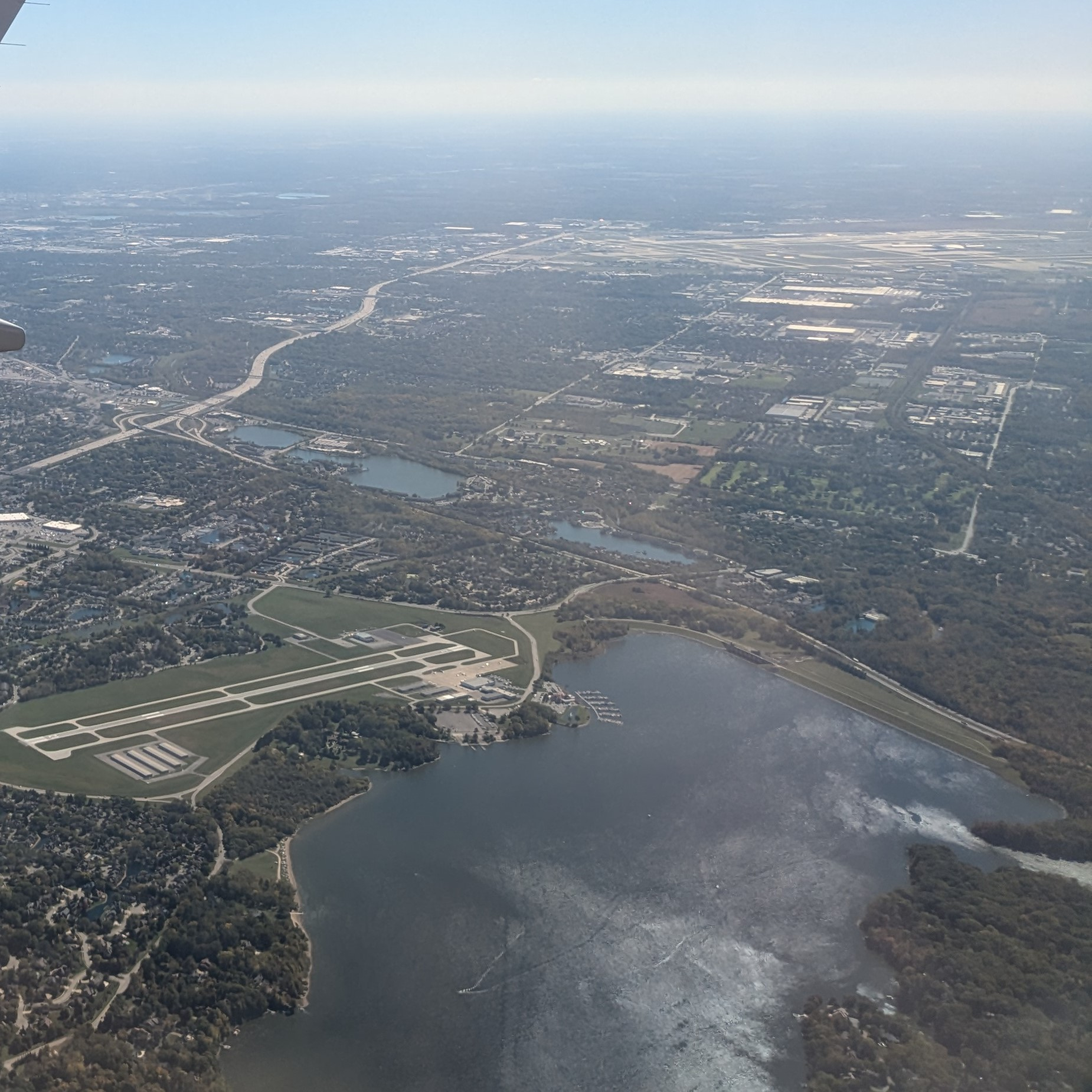
- Aerial view of Eagle Creek Airpark (left) in 2024
- IATA: none; ICAO: KEYE; FAA LID: EYE

Summary
- Airport type: Public
- Owner: Indianapolis Airport Authority
- Operator: Jet Access Eagle Creek
- Serves: Indianapolis, Indiana
- Elevation AMSL: 823 ft (251 m)
- Coordinates: 39°49′51″N 086°17′40″W

Map
- Location of airport in Indiana EYE (the United States)

Runways
Direction	Length		Surface
Direction	ft	m	Surface
03/21	4,200	1,280	Asphalt

Statistics
- Aircraft operations (2019): 20,874
- Based aircraft (2023): 86
- Source: Federal Aviation Administration

Eagle Creek Airpark (ICAO: KEYE, FAA LID: EYE) is a public use airport located seven nautical miles (13 km) west of the central business district of Indianapolis, a city in Marion County, Indiana, United States. It is owned by the Indianapolis Airport Authority and serves as a reliever airport for Indianapolis International Airport.

Although most U.S. airports use the same three-letter location identifier for the FAA and IATA, this airport is assigned EYE by the FAA but has no designation from the IATA.

== Facilities and aircraft ==
Eagle Creek Airpark covers an area of 315 acres (127 ha) at an elevation of 823 feet (251 m) above mean sea level. It has one asphalt paved runway designated 3/21 which measures 4,200 by 75 feet (1,280 x 23 m).

For the 12-month period ending December 31, 2019, the airport had 20,874 aircraft operations, an average of 57 per day: 94% general aviation and 6% air taxi. In November 2023, there were 86 aircraft based at this airport: 69 single-engine, 11 multi-engine, 5 jet and 1 ultra-light.

Jet Access Eagle Creek, the airport's fixed-base operator (FBO) is an authorized service center for Cessna Citation, Cirrus Design and Twin Commander aircraft. ECAS is also one of the eight U.S. service centers for the Embraer Phenom.

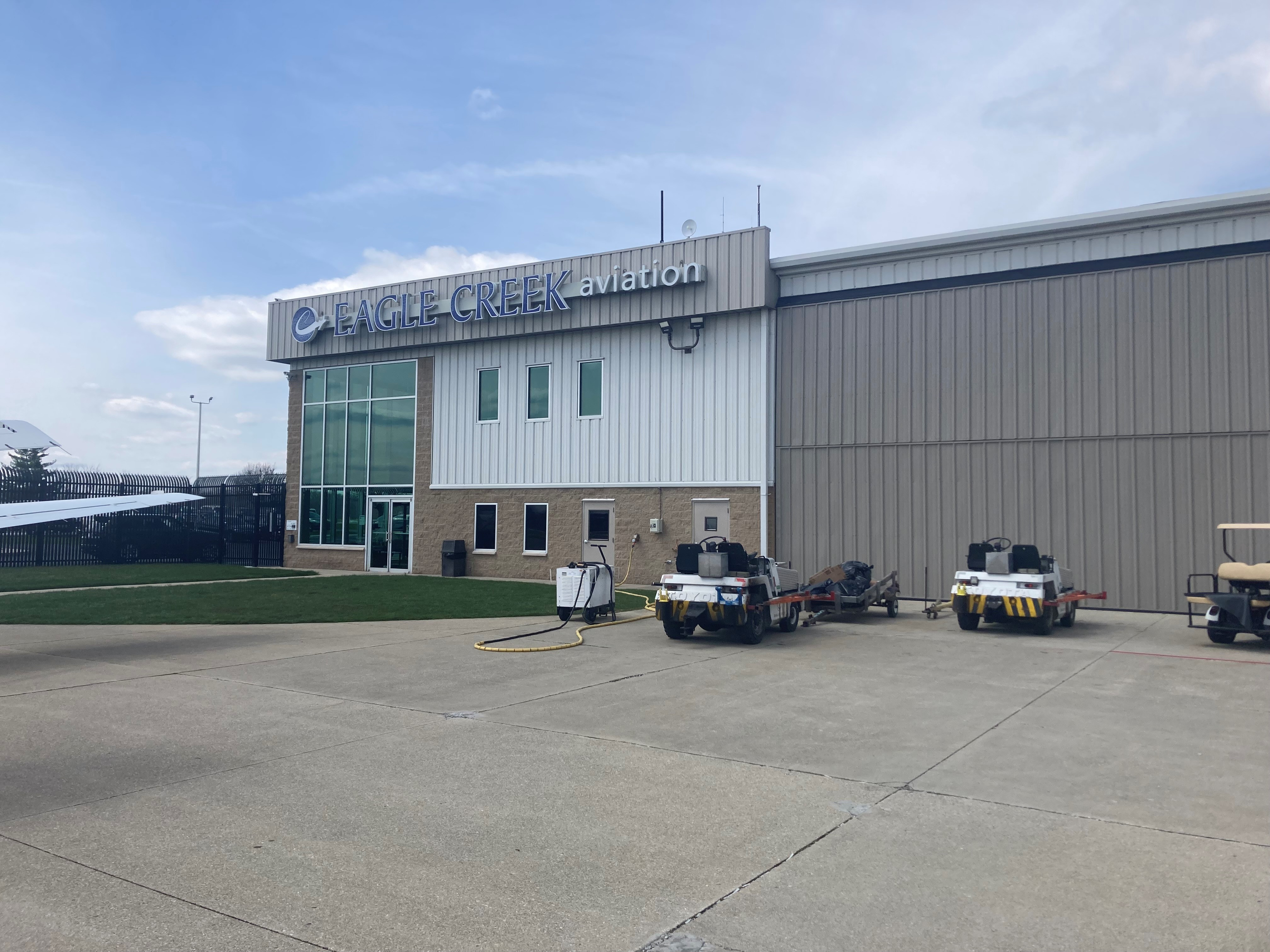
Terminal Building from aircraft parking area

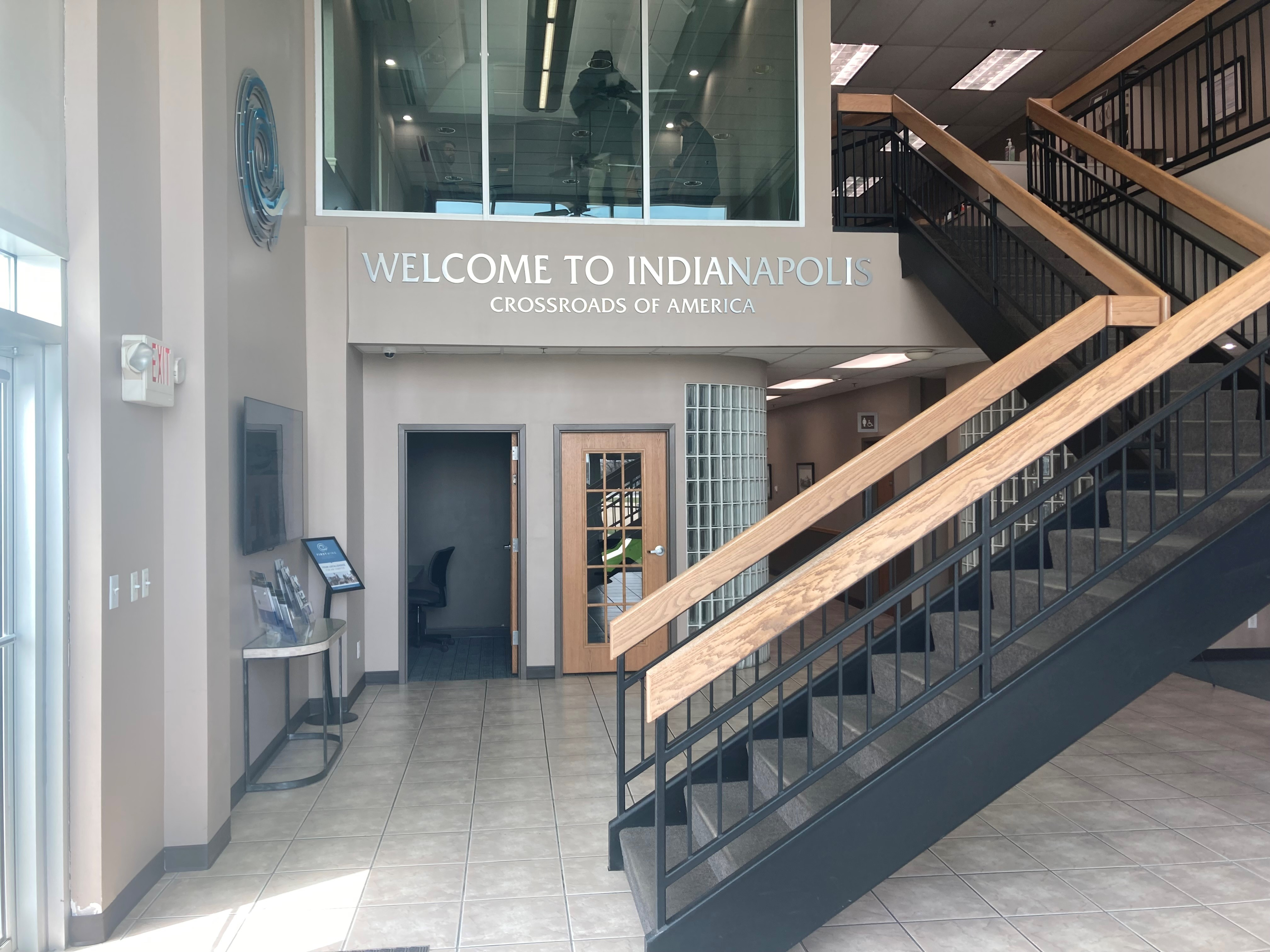
Airport lobby

== See also ==
- List of airports in Indiana
- Transportation in Indianapolis
