= Cheney Lively =

Early Indianapolis settler (1790s–1858)

- Burial place: Greenlawn Cemetery (Indianapolis, Indiana)
- Known for: First permanent Black resident in Indianapolis

Cheney Lively (c. 1790s–1858) (also spelled Chaney, Chany, China, or Chinny) was the first African-American property owner and permanent resident in Indianapolis, Indiana. Originally born into enslavement in Kentucky circa 1795, Lively was later bought (or possibly hired) by surveyor Alexander Ralston prior to 1814. Ralston brought Lively with him to Indianapolis in 1822 to serve as his housekeeper while he designed the city's original layout. Lively was a member of the First Presbyterian Church as well as the Indianapolis Tract Society where she would spread Christian literature to Native Americans and freed slaves in the area.

== Life ==
In the 1790s, Lively was born into enslavement, possibly under the ownership of Gillam, Daniel, and John Lively, in the state of Kentucky. Little is known about her life before she was purchased (or possibly hired) in the 1810s by Scottish immigrant surveyor Alexander Ralston. Ralston and Lively took up residence in rural Washington County, Indiana, sometime before 1814, where they ran a horse mill, a store, and a distillery. At this point, Lively was listed as a free black woman in local census records.

In 1822, Lively permanently moved with Ralston to Indianapolis after he was hired on to plan out the city's original lay out, which would eventually become known as the Mile Square. In Indianapolis, Lively was a member of the First Presbyterian Church and the Indianapolis Tract Society. In December 1825, Lively became a property owner after Ralston purchased an estate in her name worth $1,450 ($42,904 in 2020) according to 1835 records. Census records from 1830 also marked her as the only Black female head of household in the Indianapolis area. Ralston died in 1827, and it is likely that he left his estate to Lively, however, it is unclear how much of it actually passed to her after his death. After Ralson's death, Cheney resided in her own estate located on the northwest corner of Meridian and Maryland Streets.

In 1826, Lively married her first husband, William Smith, of which little is known. On March 9, 1836, Lively married a former slave and local Indianapolis leader from Ohio named John G. Britton. Three-year-old Eliza Jane Britton become Lively's new stepdaughter after the wedding, and Lively would go on to have no other children in her lifetime. Her new groom went on to open a barber shop and co-founded the Black Freemasons in Indianapolis. At Frederick Douglass's 1848 Colored National Convention, Bitton acted as the Indiana delegate. Lively and Britton also helped found the Bethel AME Church which opened up on Georgia Street in 1841.

In the 1850s, the Brittons moved out of the property originally bought by Ralston and moved to a house on West Washington Street. Here, Cheney Lively lived with her husband and his daughter's family.

== Death ==
Calvin Fletcher, an early Indianapolis settler and civic leader, organized a group called the Old Settlers of Indianapolis which would meet every summer at the State Fairgrounds. As some of the earliest settlers in the city, Lively and her family were invited to attend this yearly convention. At the June 1858 reunion, Fletcher read out the names of those who had died since the last convention, including Cheney Lively.

Cheney would have been around 57 years old when she died. She was survived by her husband and his daughter, Eliza Jane Britton.

With Lively's death predating the opening of Crown Hill Cemetery in Indianapolis, it is believed that she may have been interred in the Greenlawn Cemetery.
