= KUMP =

KUMP may refer to:

- KUMP-LP, a low-power radio station (107.9 FM) licensed to Days Creek, Oregon, United States
- Indianapolis Metropolitan Airport (ICAO code KUMP)
