= MQJ =

MQJ may refer to:

- Indianapolis Regional Airport (FAA LID: MQJ), Indiana, United States
- MQJ, ISO language code for Mamasa
- Moma Airport (IATA: MQJ), Sakha Republic, Russia
