= List of tallest air traffic control towers in the United States =

The following table ranks the tallest air traffic control (ATC) towers at airports in the United States.

Air traffic control towers are elevated structures for the visual observation and control of the air and ground traffic at an airport. The placement and height of an ATC tower are determined by addressing the many FAA requirements and site-specific considerations to ensure safety within the National Airspace System (NAS). The FAA has stated that new towers should be constructed with a goal of providing the shortest possible tower required to meet siting criteria for that specific airport. These criteria result in a wide variation of tower height with some rivaling or surpassing the tallest office buildings in their respective cities. ATC towers however are generally not recognized by The Council on Tall Buildings and Urban Habitat (CTBUH) as buildings because they do not meet the criteria of having at least 50 percent of their height as occupiable. For this reason, they are not ranked among a city's tallest buildings but fall under the category of "telecommunications/observation tower."

Rank	Airport	Image	Height ft (m)	Year built	Ref.
1	Hartsfield-Jackson Atlanta International Airport		398 (121.3)	2006	
2	Charlotte Douglas International Airport		370 (112.8)	2022	
3	Harry Reid International Airport		352 (107.3)	2016	
4	Indianapolis International Airport	KIND_FAA_tower	348 (106.1)	2006	
5	Orlando International Airport		345 (105.2)	2002	
6t.	Memphis International Airport		336 (102.4)	2012	
6t.	George Bush (Houston) Intercontinental Airport		336 (102.4)	1997	
8	Miami International Airport		333 (101.5)	2002	
9	Salt Lake City International Airport	Delta_Connection_Canadair_CRJ900;_N817SK@SLC;09.10.2011_621aw_(6300287622)	328 (99.9)	1999	
10	Denver International Airport	Denver_International_Airport_Tower	327 (99.7)	1995	
11	Phoenix Sky Harbor International Airport	N76522_Boeing_738_United_Taxying_Past_The_Tower_(8903296878)	326 (99.4)	2007	
12t.	Washington Dulles International Airport		325 (99.1)	2007	
12t.	Newark Liberty International Airport		325 (99.1)	2003	
14	Cleveland Hopkins International Airport		324 (98.8)	2015	
15	John F. Kennedy International Airport		320 (97.5)	1992	
