= Alexander Ralston =

Scottish-American architect

- Born: 1771; Scotland
- Died: January 5, 1827 (aged 55–56); Indianapolis, Indiana, U.S.
- Resting place: Crown Hill Cemetery and Arboretum, Section 3, Lot 30, Indianapolis, Indiana; 39.8170683°N 86.1735475°W
- Occupations: Architect, surveyor, farmer
- Known for: Designing Indianapolis

Alexander Ralston (1771 – January 5, 1827) was a Scottish-American surveyor who was one of two co-architects for the design of the city of Indianapolis, Indiana. He also helped to design Washington, D.C.

== Early life ==
Ralston was born in Scotland in 1771.

== Career ==
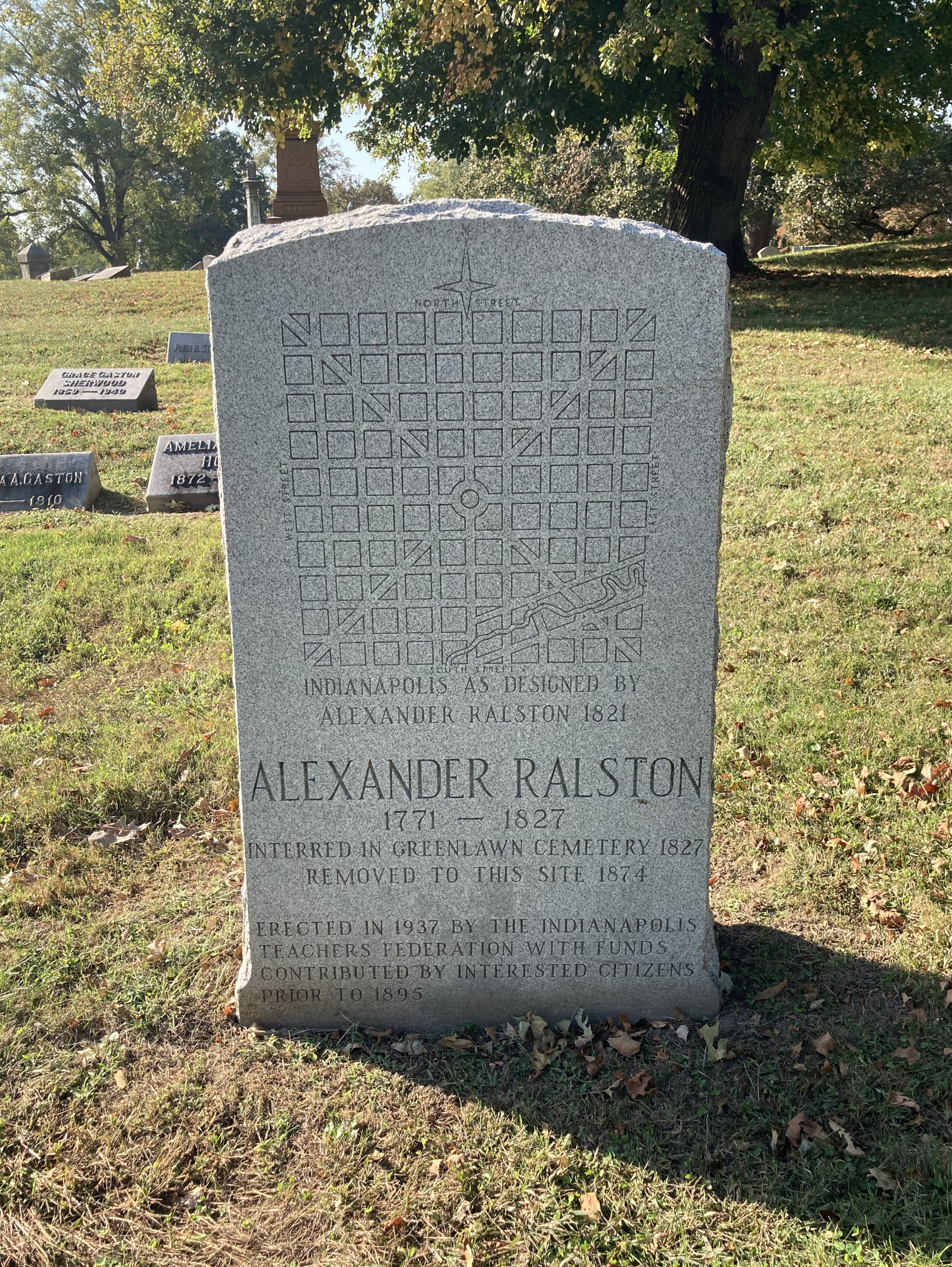
Ralston's grave at Crown Hill Cemetery

In Great Britain, he was an engineer working for the Baron of Roslin on his estate before immigrating to the United States after the American Revolution. An assistant to the French-American architect Pierre (Peter) Charles L'Enfant in 1791, Ralston helped L'Enfant lay out the city plan for Washington, D.C., as part of the L'Enfant Plan. Ralston came to Indiana sometime before 1815, leaving the east partly because of his involvement with Aaron Burr and the Burr conspiracy. He settled on a homestead in southern Indiana.

He was first hired in 1820 by Christopher Harrison, the state commissioner overseeing the survey of Indianapolis, and charged with helping to survey the city. With co-surveyor Elias Pym Fordham, Ralston's was later commissioned by the Indiana General Assembly to make a city plan for Indianapolis, developed in 1821. His original plan called for a city of only 1-square-mile (2.6 km^{2}), with a Governor's Circle, a large circular commons to be the site of the governor's mansion, at the very center of the city. The governor's mansion was demolished in 1857. In its place now stands the Soldiers' and Sailors' Monument, a 284-foot-tall (86.5-meter-tall) neoclassical limestone and bronze monument. Ralston's design borrows heavily from the city plan of Washington, D.C.

Construction on Indianapolis began in earnest, with most of his plan being implemented by 1850. The city has subsequently expanded far beyond his original conception, but the downtown area remains nearly unaltered from Ralston's original city plan. Ralston died in his Indianapolis home on January 5, 1827, and was buried at Greenlawn Cemetery. In 1874, his remains were moved and reburied in Crown Hill Cemetery in Indianapolis. His gravestone is engraved with an image of his plat of the city's initial design.

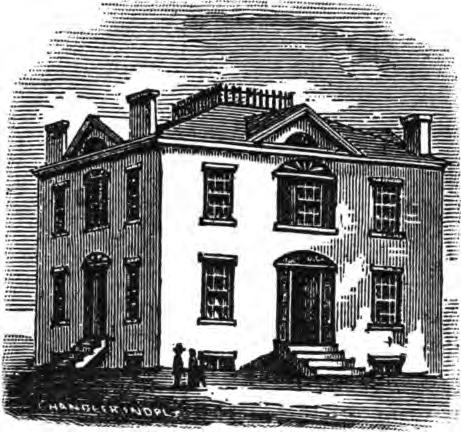
The second Indiana Governor's Residence designed by Ralston

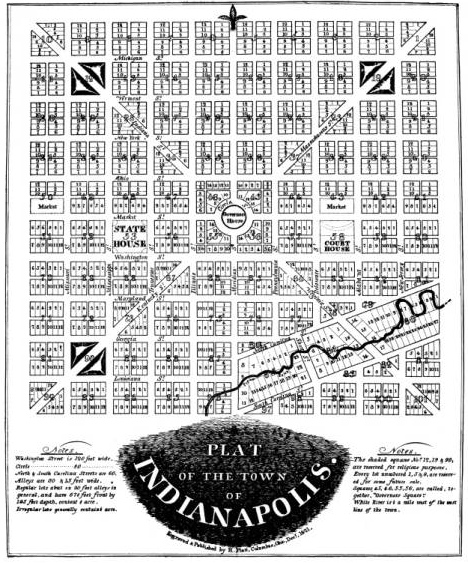
The plat, or plot design, for the city of Indianapolis as designed by Ralston
