= Indianapolis Downtown Heliport =

Heliport in Indianapolis, Indiana, US

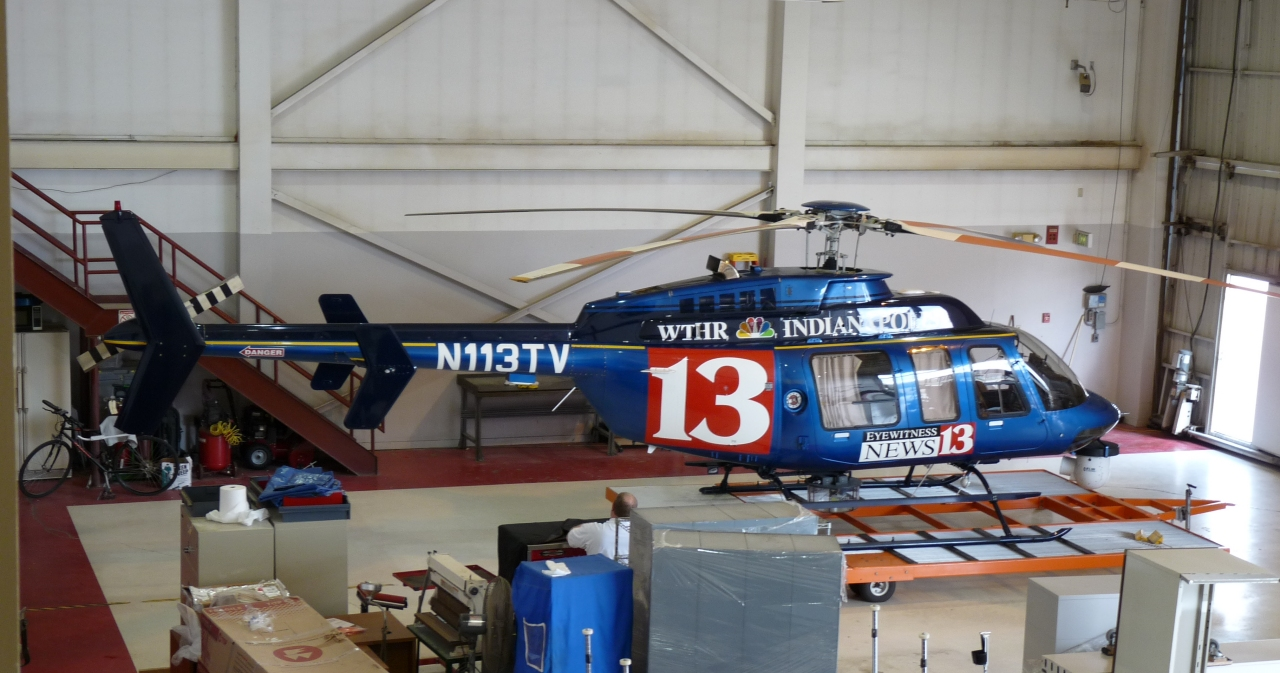
- WTHR's news helicopter at the heliport in 2011; the station eventually discontinued its use of the helicopter in the late 2010s after an ownership change.
- IATA: -; ICAO: -; FAA LID: 8A4

Summary
- Airport type: Public
- Owner: Indianapolis Airport Authority
- Serves: Indianapolis
- Elevation AMSL: 732 ft (223 m)
- Coordinates: 39.765876°N 86.148875°W
- Website: Indianapolisairport.com - Heliport

Map
- Location of heliport in Indiana 8A4 (the United States)

Helipads
Number	Length		Surface
Number	ft	m	Surface
H1	60	18	Concrete

Indianapolis Downtown Heliport is a heliport located in the city center of Indianapolis. The heliport was opened in 1969 as a private use heliport under the name Beeline Heliport and, in 1979, was turned into a public facility operated by the Indianapolis Airport Authority (IAA). In 1983, the FAA picked the heliport to be part of its National Prototype Demonstration Heliport Program, a project launched to illustrate the usefulness and viability of full-service downtown heliports in the United States, and as a result it received considerable funding for improvements and expansion. It currently has one main pad for landing, an apron, and two hangars. IFR approaches are possible.

By the late 2010s, the city's television stations had phased out use of helicopters due to budgetary concerns, as did the Indianapolis Metropolitan Police Department with the introduction of camera-equipped drones, leaving Indiana University Health's LifeLine as the only tenant.

In mid-2020, the IAA submitted a request to the city of Indianapolis to approve the closing of the heliport, stating that the financial burden of operating the facility was greater than the public value derived from it. In December of that year, the IAA made a formal request to the Federal Aviation Administration for the closure. The IAA is working with the last tenant of the helipad, Indiana University Health's LifeLine, to find a new location for LifeLine's helicopters. Upon closure, the 5-acre (2.0 ha) site will be sold for commercial development.

== See also ==
- List of airports in Indiana
- Transportation in Indianapolis
