= Indianapolis Metropolitan Airport =

Airport in Fishers, Indiana, US

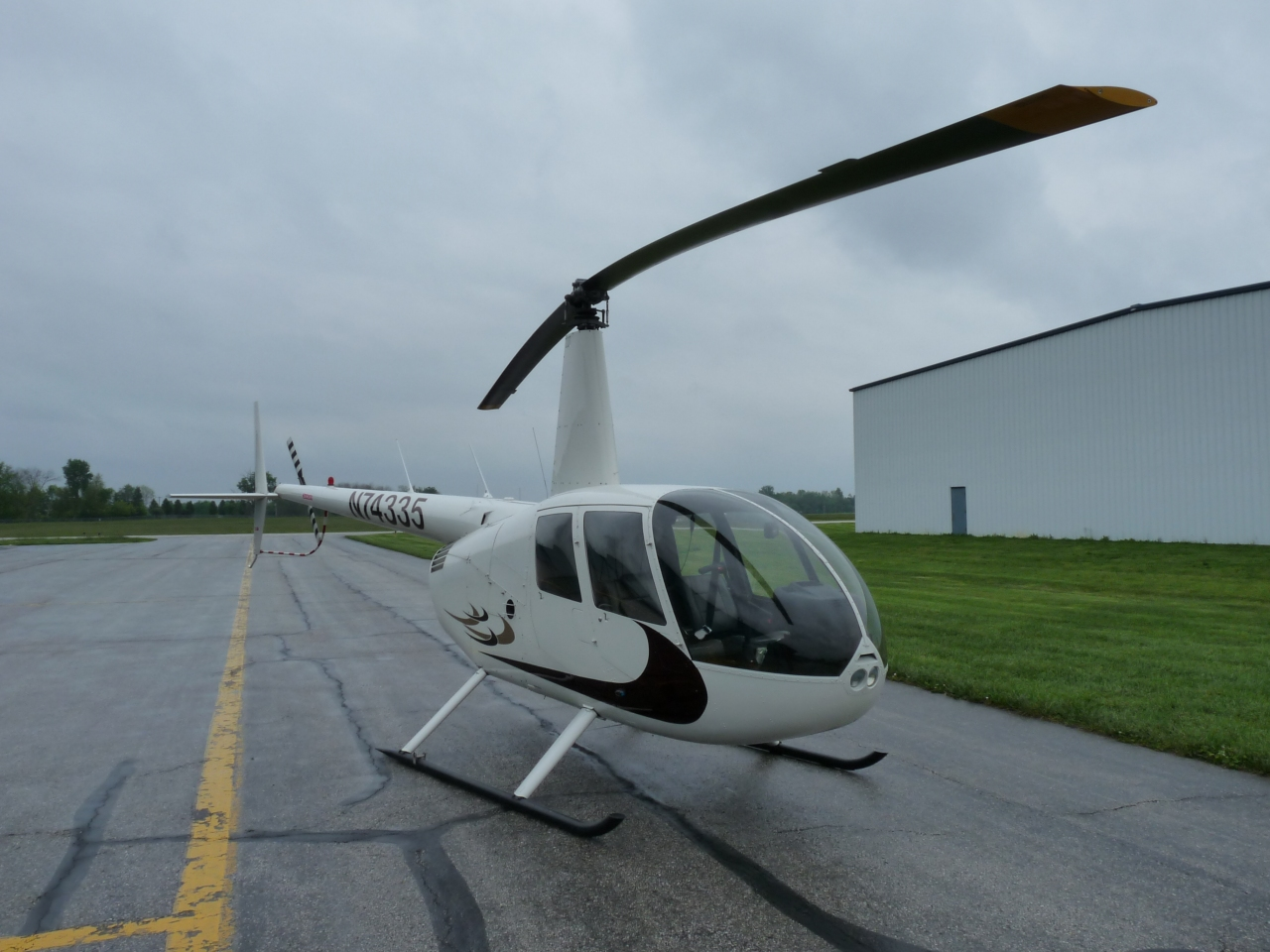
- IATA: none; ICAO: KUMP; FAA LID: UMP

Summary
- Airport type: Public
- Owner: Indianapolis Airport Authority
- Operator: Tom Wood Aviation
- Serves: Indianapolis, Indiana
- Location: Fishers, Indiana
- Elevation AMSL: 811 ft (247 m)
- Coordinates: 39°56′07″N 086°02′42″W

Map
- Location of airport in Indiana UMP (the United States)

Runways
Direction	Length		Surface
Direction	ft	m	Surface
15/33	4,004	1,220	Asphalt

Statistics
- Aircraft operations (2016): 24,590
- Based aircraft (2018): 111
- Source: Federal Aviation Administration

Indianapolis Metropolitan Airport (ICAO: KUMP, FAA LID: UMP) is a public airport in Fishers, Hamilton County, Indiana, United States. It is 8 miles (13 km) northeast of downtown Indianapolis, is owned by the Indianapolis Airport Authority and is a reliever airport for Indianapolis International Airport.

Most U.S. airports use the same three-letter location identifier for the FAA and IATA, but Indianapolis Metropolitan Airport is "UMP" to the FAA and has no IATA code.

== Facilities and aircraft ==
Indianapolis Metropolitan Airport covers 445 acres (180 ha); its one runway, 15/33, is 4,004 x 100 ft (1,220 x 30 m) asphalt.

For the year ending December 31, 2016, the airport had 24,590 aircraft operations, an average of 67 per day: 80% general aviation, 17% air taxi and 3% military. In June 2018, there were 111 aircraft based at this airport: 90 single-engine, 10 multi-engine, 5 jet and 6 helicopter.

Tom Wood Aviation is the FBO (fixed-base operator), with full-service Shell fueling of 100LL and Jet-A, FAA certified aircraft charter, full service aircraft management, pilot service, flight instruction, aircraft repair, maintenance and alterations, and aircraft sales. The facilities include coffee, ice, pilots' lounge with TV, executive conference rooms, public restrooms, catering services and more. Rental vehicles are available through SIXT Rental Cars.

== See also ==
- List of airports in Indiana
- Transportation in Indianapolis
