= Indianapolis Regional Airport =

Airport in Hancock County, IN, US

- IATA: none; ICAO: KMQJ; FAA LID: MQJ

Summary
- Airport type: Public
- Owner: Indianapolis Airport Authority
- Operator: Jet Access Indianapolis
- Serves: Indianapolis, Indiana
- Location: Greenfield / McCordsville
- Elevation AMSL: 862 ft (263 m)
- Coordinates: 39°50′37″N 085°53′49″W

Map
- Location of airport in Indiana MQJ (the United States)

Runways
Direction	Length		Surface
Direction	ft	m	Surface
7/25	6,005	1,830	Asphalt
16/34	3,902	1,189	Concrete

Statistics
- Aircraft operations (2019): 47,648
- Based aircraft (2019): 150
- Sources: FAA, IAA.

Indianapolis Regional Airport (ICAO: KMQJ, FAA LID: MQJ) is a public use airport in Hancock County, Indiana, United States. Owned by Indianapolis Airport Authority, it is 12 nautical miles (22 km) east of the central business district of Indianapolis. The airport is also 7 nautical miles (13 km) northwest of Greenfield and 3 nautical miles (6 km) southwest of McCordsville. It was known as Mount Comfort Airport until March 2011.

This facility is included in the National Plan of Integrated Airport Systems for 2017–2021, which categorized it as a general aviation reliever airport for Indianapolis International Airport. Although many U.S. airports use the same three-letter location identifier for the FAA and IATA, Indianapolis Regional Airport is assigned MQJ by the FAA but has no designation from the IATA (which assigned MQJ to Moma Airport in Khonuu, Russia).

== Facilities and aircraft ==
Indianapolis Regional Airport covers an area of 1,805 acres (730 ha) at an elevation of 862 feet (263 m) above mean sea level. It has two runways: 7/25 with a 6,005 by 100 ft (1,830 by 30 m) asphalt surface and 16/34 with a 3,902 by 75 ft (1,189 by 23 m) concrete surface.

For the 12-month period ending December 31, 2019, the airport had 47,648 aircraft operations, an average of 130 per day: 84% general aviation and 16% air taxi. In December 2019, there were 150 aircraft based at this airport: 115 single-engine, 14 multi-engine, 19 jet, 1 helicopter and 1 ultralight.

== See also ==
- List of airports in Indiana
- Transportation in Indianapolis
