= Indianapolis Chain and Stamping Company =

American bicycle component manufacturer

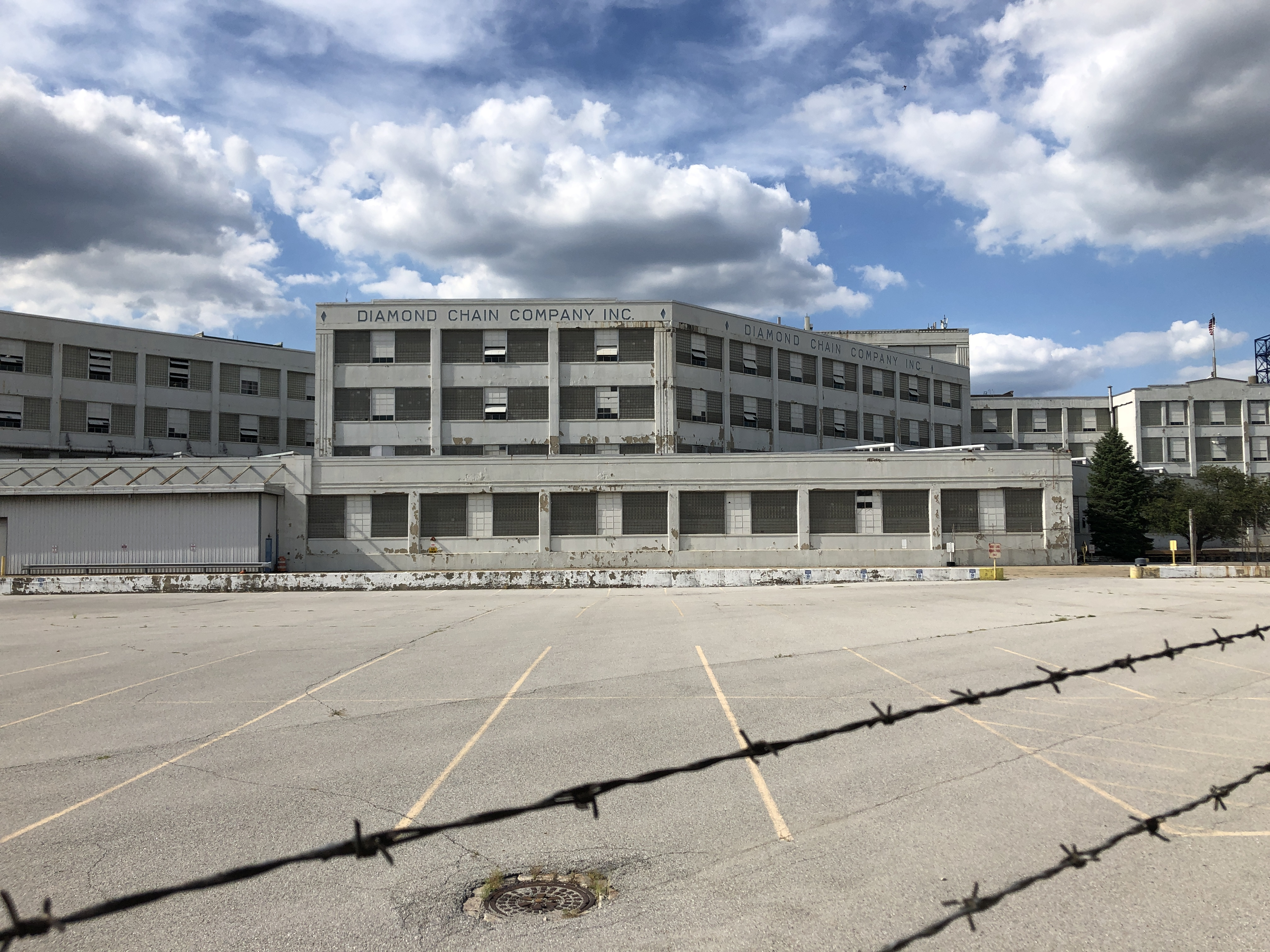
- Diamond Chain Company in 2022
- Industry: Manufacturing
- Founded: 1890; 135 years ago in Chicago, U.S.
- Founder: Arthur C. Newby
- Successor: Diamond Chain
- Headquarters: Indianapolis
- Products: Bicycle chains
- Website: Diamond

Indianapolis Chain and Stamping Company also known as Diamond is a company based in Indianapolis, Indiana. At one time they supplied bicycle chains for the majority of bicycles produced in the United States.

== Background ==
The company was started in 1890 by Arthur C. Newby and partners Edward C. Fletcher and Glenn Howe. The company grew to provide bicycle chains on 60% of all bicycles sold in the United States. The chains were produced under the name Diamond.

== History ==
The company began with four machines and four workers. The only product of the company was chains to for bicycle wheel sprockets. The company experienced growth and began to construct a new building in 1895. The new factory was completed in November 1895. The factory was located where the Hoosier Dome formerly sat in Indianapolis.

In 1896 Henry Ford purchased ten feet of chain from the company. Experts believe Ford used the chain on his first Quadricycle.

In 1899 The company was sold to a bicycle trust under the name American Bicycle Company which was run by Albert Pope.

The Wilbur and Orville Wright operated a bicycle store in Ohio, and they became agents for the company. In 1903 the Wright Brothers had the company design special chains which they used to make their historic first airplane flight at Kitty Hawk.

In 1905 the company was then sold to Lucius Wainwright who had been managing the business. The company was renamed Diamond Chain & Manufacturing Company. Automobiles were becoming popular and the company expanded to make chains for automobiles.

The company still exists under the name Diamond. The company has diversified and they now produce chains for a variety of industries.
