= Indianapolis Airport Authority =

Government agency in Indiana, United States

The Indianapolis Airport Authority (IAA) is a municipal corporation established by the Indiana General Assembly in 1962. It is responsible for owning, developing and operating several public airports and one public heliport located in and around Indianapolis, a city in Marion County and the capital of Indiana.

The IAA consists of eight directors, who are appointed by the Mayor of Indianapolis and certain other officials in Marion, Hamilton, and Hendricks counties. Since 1981, the IAA has overseen the Greater Indianapolis Foreign Trade Zone, Inc. (FTZ 72) (d/b/a INzone), a federal foreign-trade zone encompassing 41 Central Indiana counties.

The Indianapolis Airport Authority Police Department provides security and policing at IAA facilities.

== Facilities ==
The Indianapolis Airport Authority owns, develops and operates the following facilities:

- Indianapolis International Airport (IND)
- Eagle Creek Airpark (EYE)
- Indianapolis Metropolitan Airport (UMP)
- Indianapolis Regional Airport (formerly named Mount Comfort Airport) (MQJ)
- Hendricks County Airport-Gordon Graham Field (2R2)
- Indianapolis Downtown Heliport (8A4)

== See also ==
- Government of Indianapolis
- Transportation in Indianapolis
