= Indianapolis International Airport =

Airport serving Indianapolis, Indiana, US

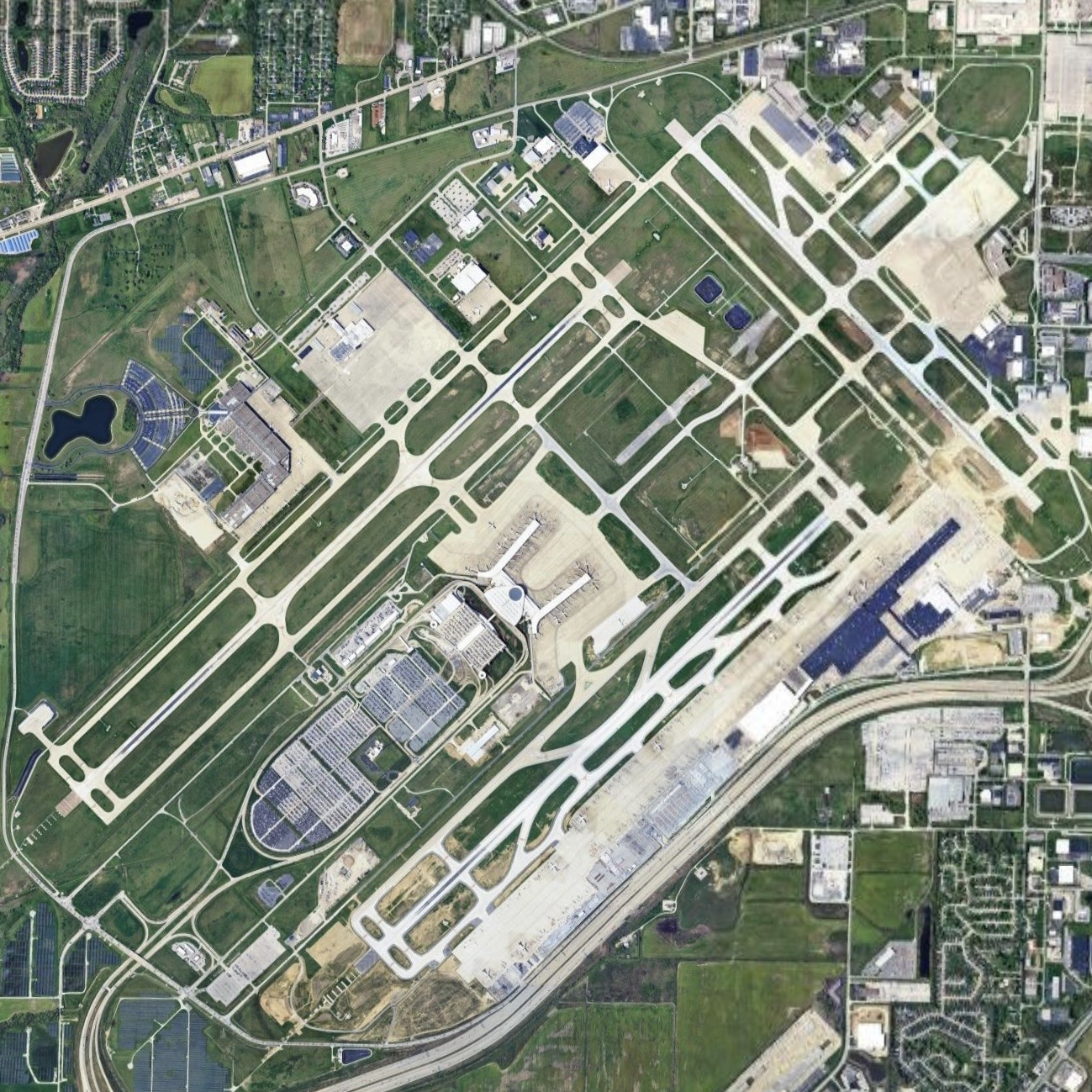
- Satellite image of the airport in 2024
- IATA: IND; ICAO: KIND; FAA LID: IND; WMO: 72438

Summary
- Airport type: Public
- Owner/Operator: Indianapolis Airport Authority
- Serves: Indianapolis
- Location: 7800 Col. H. Weir Cook Memorial Drive; Indianapolis, Indiana, United States
- Opened: September 24, 1931; 95 years ago (as Indianapolis Municipal Airport)
- Hub for: FedEx Express
- Operating base for: Allegiant Air; Republic Airways
- Elevation AMSL: 797 ft (243 m)
- Coordinates: 39°43′02″N 086°17′40″W
- Public transit access: IndyGo: 8 – Washington (Future Blue Line)
- Website: ind.com

Maps
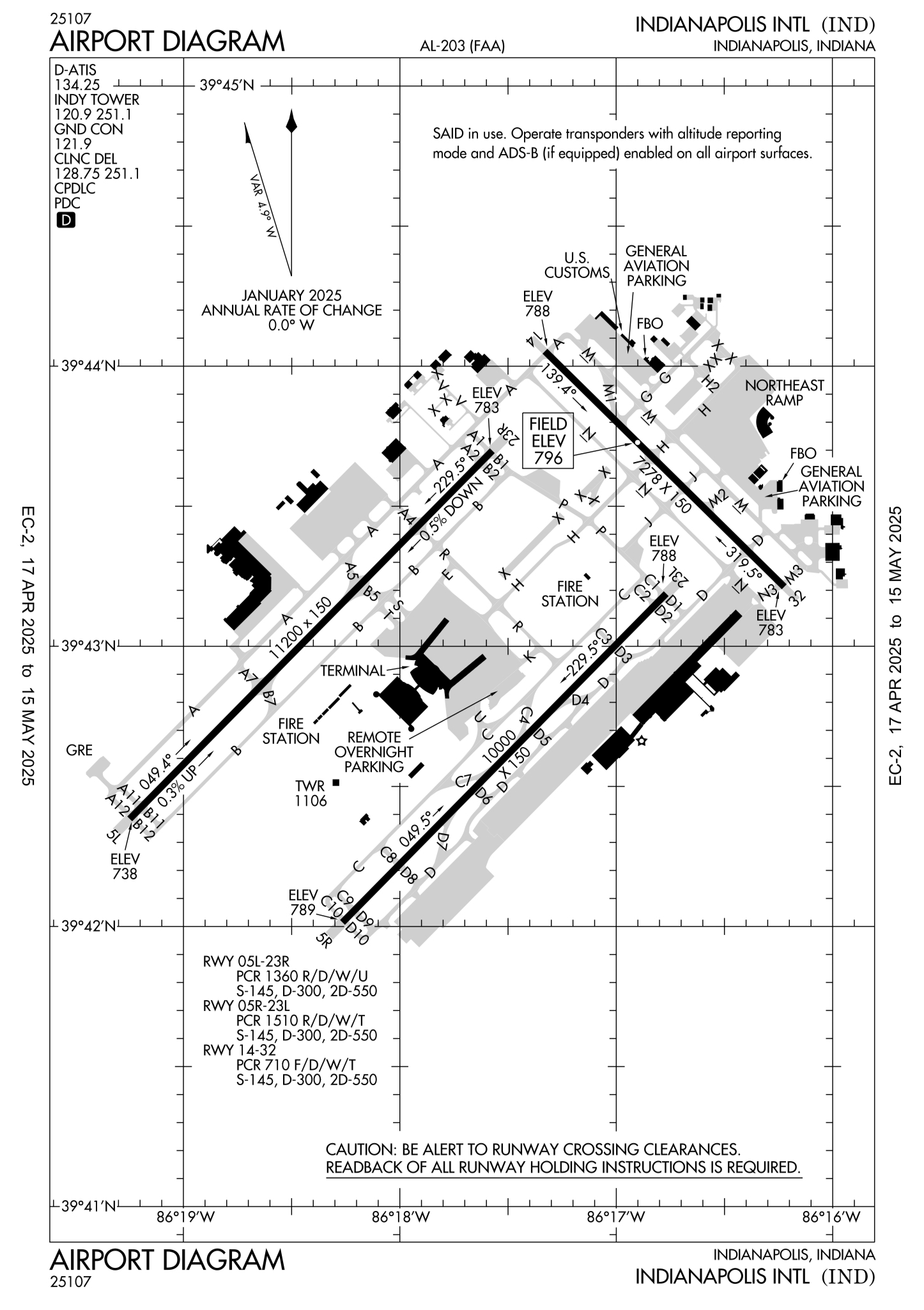
- FAA airport diagram as of April 2025
- Interactive map of Indianapolis International Airport

Runways
Direction	Length		Surface
Direction	ft	m	Surface
5L/23R	11,200	3,414	Concrete
5R/23L	10,000	3,048	Concrete
14/32	7,278	2,218	Asphalt

Statistics (2025)
- Total passengers: 10,616,093 ▲0.9%
- Air cargo (metric tons): 899,065
- Aircraft operations: 198,391
- Source: Indianapolis International Airport

Indianapolis International Airport (IATA: IND, ICAO: KIND, FAA LID: IND) is an international airport located seven miles (11 km) southwest of Downtown Indianapolis in Marion County, Indiana, United States. It is owned and operated by the Indianapolis Airport Authority, and the airport serves over 50 non-stop destinations throughout North America, the Caribbean and Europe. As of 2024, IND is the 46th-busiest airport in the U.S. and the busiest in Indiana with 5,180,917 passengers.

The airport occupies 7,700 acres (3,116 ha) in Wayne and Decatur townships in Marion County. IND is home to the second largest FedEx Express hub in the world; only the FedEx SuperHub in Memphis, Tennessee, surpasses its cargo traffic. Largely because of FedEx's activity, IND consistently ranks among the top 10 busiest U.S. airports in terms of air cargo throughput. Republic Airways is also headquartered at the airport, and Allegiant Air maintains Indianapolis as an operating base.

The Indianapolis Air Route Traffic Control Center (ZID), one of 22 established FAA area control centers, is located on the airport property's north side.

The Federal Aviation Administration (FAA) National Plan of Integrated Airport Systems for 2025–2029 categorized it as a medium hub primary commercial service facility.

== History ==
=== Beginnings ===
Indianapolis Municipal Airport opened on September 24, 1931, replacing the older Stout Field as the primary city airport. The airport was initially built on about 320 acres (130 ha) of land in the southwestern edge of the city, with an additional 627 acres (254 ha) reserved for future expansions at the airport. In 1944, it was renamed Weir Cook Municipal Airport, after US Army Air Forces Col. Harvey Weir Cook of Wilkinson, Indiana, who had become a flying ace during World War I with seven victories and had died flying a P-39 over New Caledonia in World War II.

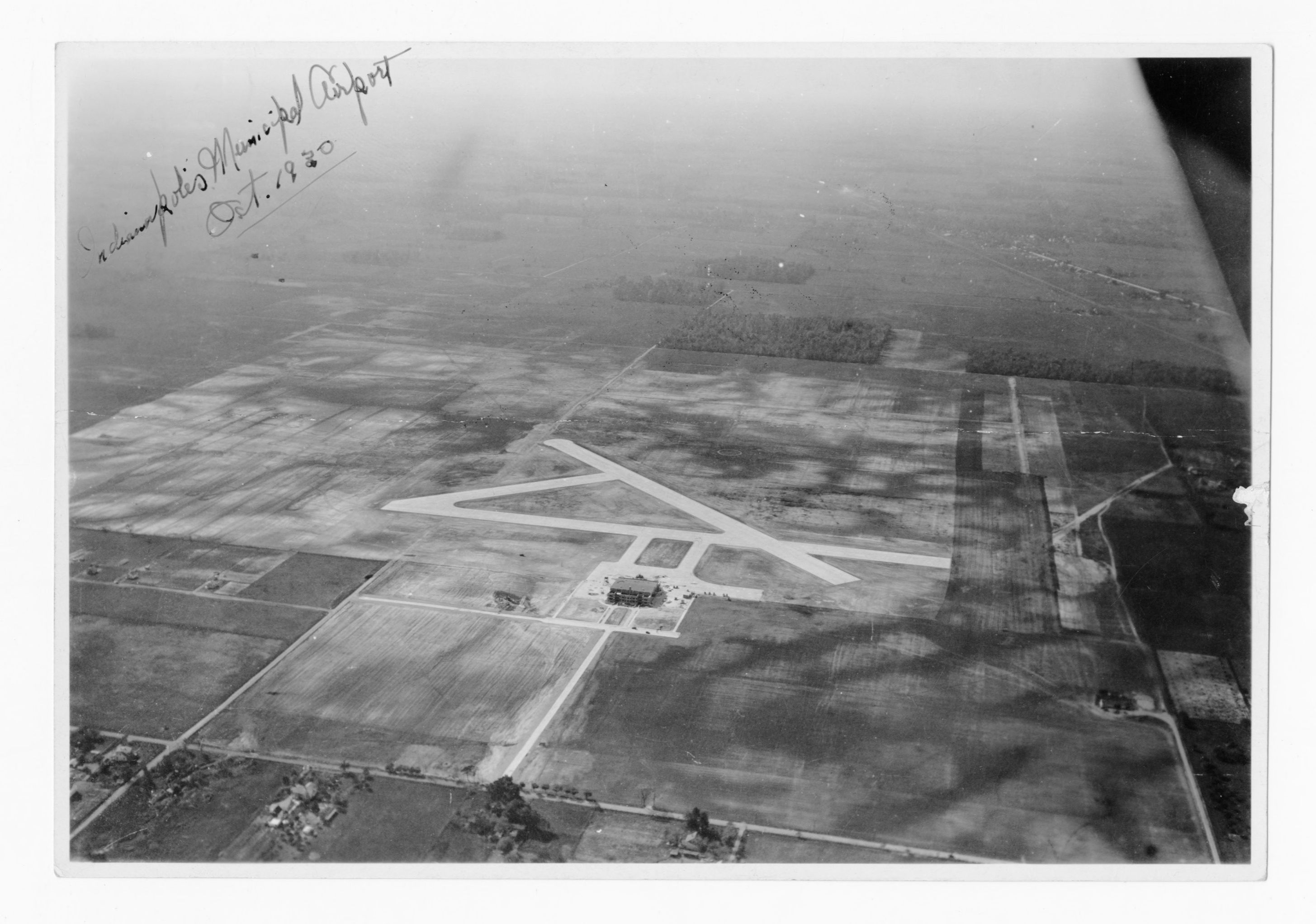
Aerial perspective of Indianapolis Municipal Airport under development in October 1930.

Indianapolis was one of many stops along the first transcontinental air/rail service between Los Angeles and New York that was started by Transcontinental Air Transport (TAT) in 1929. TAT would later become Trans World Airlines (TWA) and continued to serve IND until their merger into American Airlines in 2001.

Since 1962, the airport has been owned and operated by the Indianapolis Airport Authority (IAA). The IAA has an eight-member board with members appointed by the mayor of Indianapolis and other officials from Marion, Hendricks, and Hamilton counties in central Indiana. In 1976, the board renamed the airport Indianapolis International Airport.

From 1957 to 2008, the passenger terminal was on the east side of the airfield off High School Road. This now-demolished facility was renovated and expanded many times, notably in 1968 (Concourses A and B), 1972 (Concourse D), and 1987 (Concourse C and the attached parking garage). This complex, along with the International Arrivals Terminal (opened in 1976) on the north side of the airfield (off Pierson Drive), was replaced by the Col. H. Weir Cook Terminal on November 12, 2008.

The April 1957 Official Airline Guide (OAG) shows 82 weekday departures: 24 Eastern, 22 TWA, 15 Delta, 11 American, 9 Lake Central and 1 Ozark. Eastern had a nonstop to Atlanta and one to Birmingham and TWA had two to New York-LaGuardia; no other nonstops reached beyond Chicago, St. Louis, Memphis, Louisville and Pittsburgh. The first jets were TWA Convair 880s in 1961. Westward nonstops did not reach beyond St. Louis until 1967 when TWA started a JFK-IND-LAX flight with a Boeing 707. In the mid-1970s, TWA ran a widebody Lockheed L-1011 on the nonstop flight to Los Angeles.

In 1970, the first customs facility at the airport was initiated at the private terminal of Voyager 1000, an air travel club based at IND.

=== Recent years ===
During the late 1980s and early 1990s, USAir (later US Airways) had a secondary hub in Indianapolis with non-stop jets to the West Coast, East Coast, and Florida and turboprop flights to cities around the Midwest. USAir peaked at 146 daily departures (including its prop affiliates), with 49% of all seats. USAir ended the hub in the late 1990s.

FedEx Express began its hub at the airport in 1988, with an expansion of the hub occurring ten years later. The hub employs around 4,000 people and has a sort capacity of nearly 100,000 packages per hour, making Indianapolis the largest FedEx hub in the world outside of the company's SuperHub in Memphis.

In the late 1990s and early 2000s, Indianapolis was a hub for then locally based ATA Airlines and its regional affiliate, Chicago Express/ATA Connection. After that airline entered Chapter 11 bankruptcy protection in late 2004, operations at IND were cut, then eliminated in 2006. ATA's demise gave Northwest Airlines an opportunity to expand operations, making Indianapolis a focus city with mainline flights to the West Coast, East Coast, and the South. Northwest was later acquired by Delta Air Lines in 2008, and a decade later, Delta began service from Indianapolis to Paris in May 2018. This flight was the first ever non-stop transatlantic passenger flight out of Indianapolis. The flight, DL500, was suspended in March 2020 due to the COVID-19 pandemic.

In 1990, Air Canada began nonstop service from Indianapolis to Toronto Pearson International Airport, marking the first regularly scheduled international flight out of IND. Air Canada Jazz, which operated the flight from 2001, would be retired by Air Canada in 2012, and service to IND would continue under the new Air Canada Express brand.

In 1994, BAA USA was awarded a 10-year contract to manage the Indianapolis International Airport. The contract was extended three years but was later cut a year short at the request of the BAA. Private management ended on December 31, 2007, and control reverted to IAA. Also in 1994, United Airlines finished building its Indianapolis Maintenance Center at a cost of US$600 million. United later moved their maintenance operations to its sole maintenance hub located at San Francisco International Airport. Around 2006, runway 14/32 was shortened from 7,604 feet (2,318 m) to its present length because the south end was not visible from the new control tower.

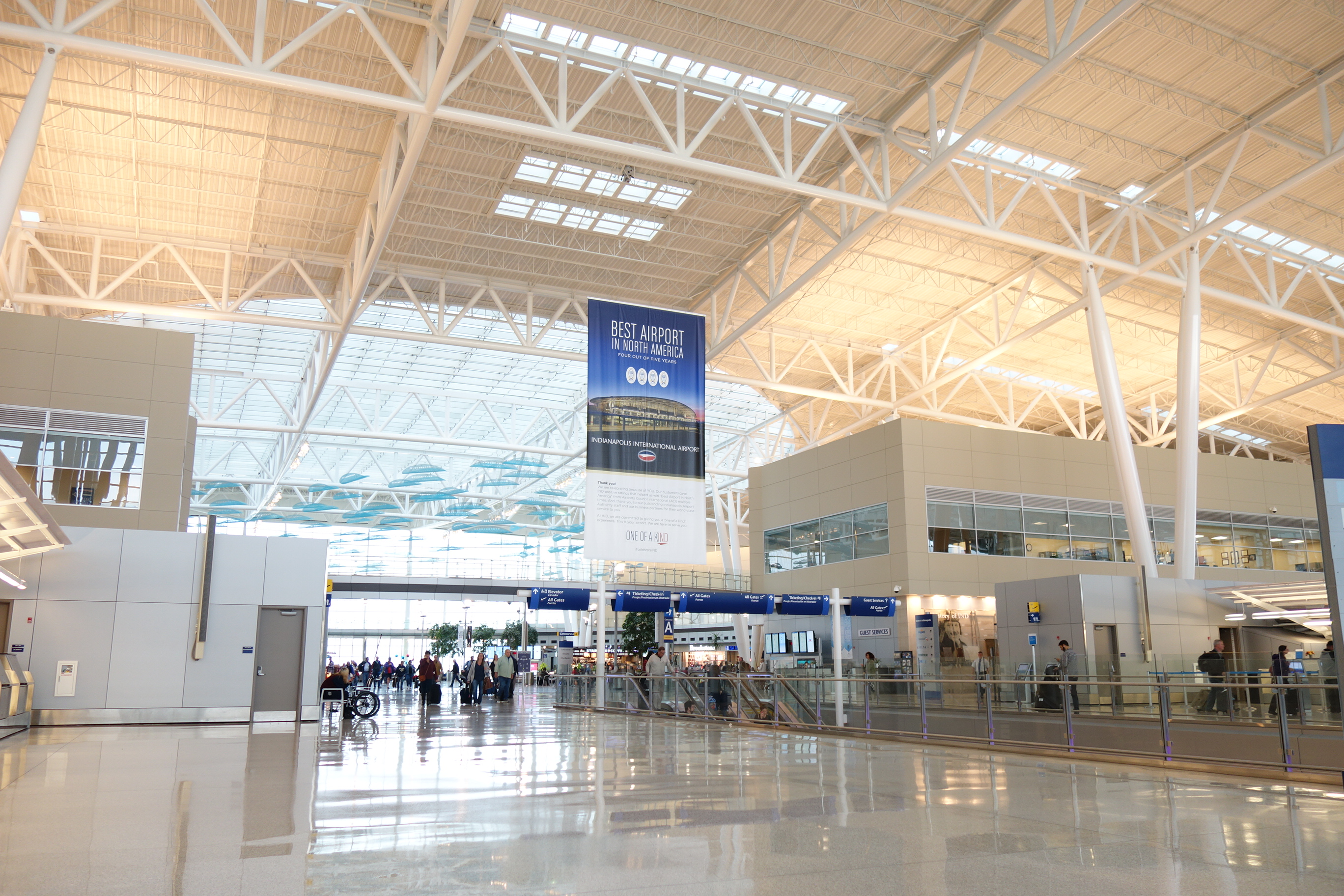
Interior of the airport's Col. H. Weir Cook Terminal in 2015

A new 1.2-million-square-foot (110,000 m^{2}) midfield passenger terminal, which cost $1.1 billion, opened in 2008 between the airport's two parallel runways, southwest of the previous terminal and the crosswind runway. A new FAA Air Traffic Control Tower (ATCT) and Terminal Radar Approach Control (TRACON) building, the second tallest in the United States, opened in April 2006, the first component of the long-planned midfield complex. The Weir Cook Terminal itself opened for arriving flights on the evening of November 11, 2008, and for departures the following morning. HOK was its master designer, with AeroDesign Group (a joint venture of CSO Architects, SchenkelShultz Architecture, and ARCHonsortium) serving as the architect of record. Aviation Capital Management (Indianapolis), a subsidiary of BSA LifeStructures, was the airport's program manager. Hunt/Smoot Midfield Builders, a joint venture of Hunt Construction Group and Smoot Construction was the construction manager. Thornton Tomasetti was the terminal's structural engineer along with Fink, Roberts and Petrie. Syska Hennessy was the mechanical, electrical, & plumbing engineer. In 2021, a six-person panel of Indianapolis members of the American Institute of Architects (AIA) identified the Col. H. Weir Cook Terminal among the ten most "architecturally significant" buildings completed in the city since World War II.

A 183-acre (74 ha), 22 MW solar farm consisting of 87,478 solar panels is located at the approach end of runway 5R. As of late 2025, it is the largest airport solar farm in the world. The airport plans to further expand solar capacity by covering the parking lots with solar canopies as part of its goal to be energy self-sufficient and carbon-neutral.

In August 2017, Allegiant Air announced it would open a $40 million aircraft base at the airport that would begin operations in February of the following year. The facility was to create 66 high-paying jobs by the end of year and house two Airbus aircraft.

On August 16, 2019, the Indianapolis Airport Authority announced a $76 million plan to expand the terminal parking garage. The airport's existing parking garage, which opened with the new terminal in 2008, had an existing 5,900 public parking spaces and 1,200 rental car spaces. The five-story expansion began construction in fall 2022 with F.A. Wilhelm as the general contractor to build the 500,000 square feet (46,000 m^{2}) expansion, giving the airport an extra 500 public parking spots and 1,000 rental car spaces including the installation of a solar canopy that spanning the entire addition. The expansion opened in early 2024.

In May 2020, Contour Airlines announced it would open an aircraft base at the airport that would begin operations in October 2021, launching three new unserved domestic routes. The facility was to create 55 high-paying jobs by the end of 2023, and house 2 regional jets. In 2022, Contour later announced that they would end operations at IND due to the COVID-19 pandemic.

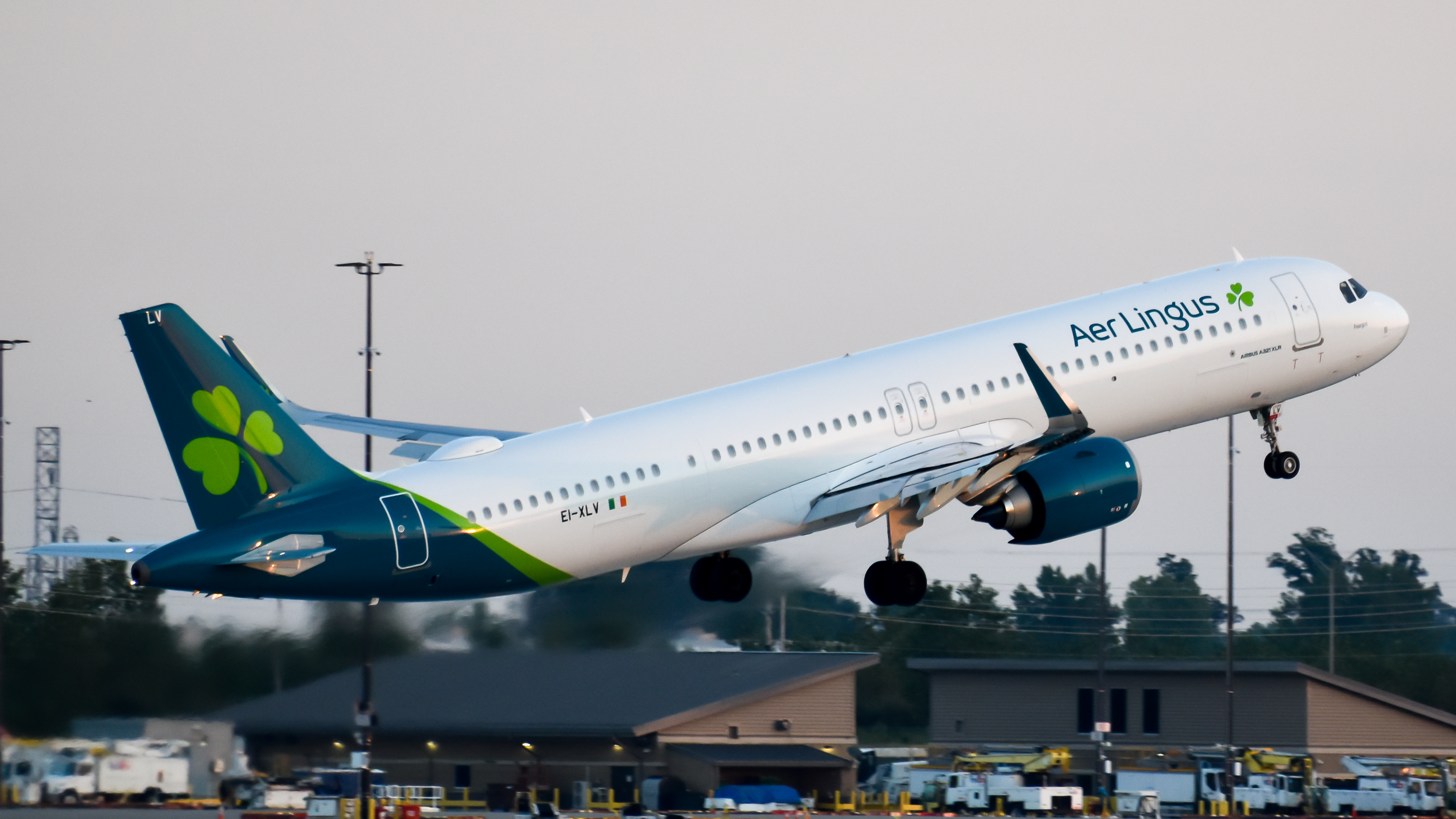
An Aer Lingus Airbus A321-253NY(XLR) departing IND

International service to IND has increased in recent years. On October 21, 2024, Aer Lingus announced nonstop flights to Dublin, Ireland beginning May 2025, marking the first transatlantic flight out of Indianapolis since 2020. In March 2025, American Airlines announced service to Punta Cana in the Dominican Republic. In April, Delta Air Lines announced service to Cancún. In August of the same year, Southwest Airlines announced service to San José del Cabo in Mexico, then in early October Southwest Airlines also announced non-stop service to San Juan in Puerto Rico.

On December 22, 2025, AAR Corp., an aircraft maintenance service to commercial and government customers announced they would be permanently closing AAR Indianapolis by February 28, 2027. AAR started layoffs of the almost 330 employees on February 15, 2026. AAR leased the 367,000 square feet (34,100 m^{2}) hangar at IND beginning in 2004, a hangar which was originally occupied by United Airlines until 2003.

== Facilities ==
=== Airport hotel ===
The Indianapolis Airport Authority voted on February 21, 2025, to build a new hotel at the airport. The 253-room Marriott Westin-branded hotel will connect to the west side of the terminal parking garage, allowing direct access to the airport terminal. The hotel will feature a full-service restaurant, a seventh-floor lounge area with an airfield view open to the public, a fitness center, approximately 10,000 square feet (930 m^{2}) of meeting space, and dedicated parking with valet. Groundbreaking for the Westin Indianapolis Airport hotel began in June 2025, with anticipated completion of the almost $206 million project in December 2027.

=== Terminal ===
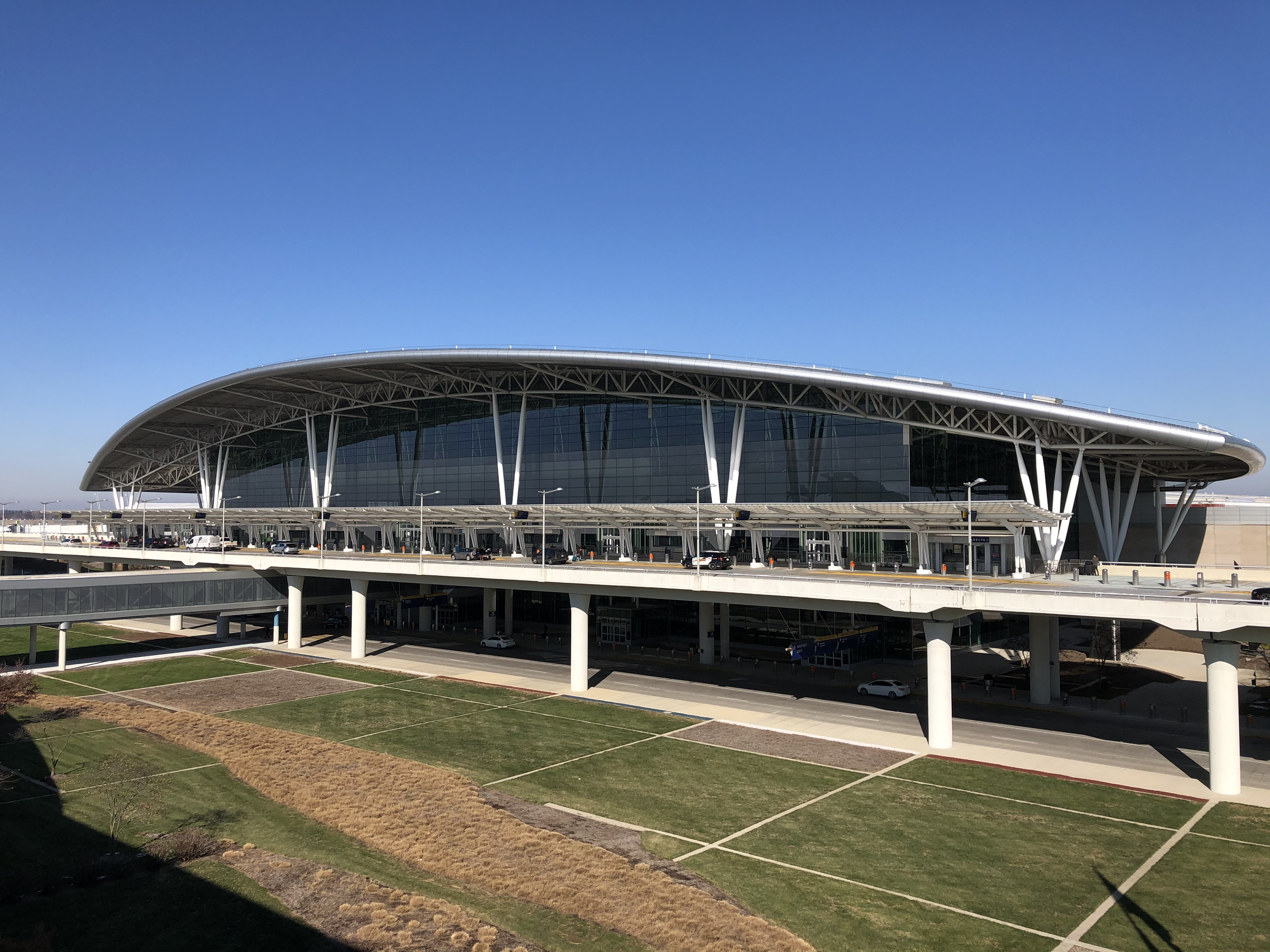
Exterior of the Col. H. Weir Cook Terminal in 2019

Indianapolis International Airport has a single terminal with two concourses and a total of 39 gates. The current terminal opened in 2008 and is named in honor of Col. Harvey Weir Cook. It was one of the first designed and built in the U.S. following the September 11 attacks. International arrivals are processed in Concourse A (Gates A4-A5).

- Concourse A contains 20 gates (Gates A3-A8, A10-A17, A20-A25). It serves Aer Lingus, Air Canada, Alaska Airlines, Avelo Airlines, Delta Air Lines, Frontier Airlines, JetBlue, Sun Country Airlines, and United Airlines.
- Concourse B contains 19 gates (Gates B3-B10, B13-B17, (Note: Gate B12 was removed in order to handle larger aircraft.) B20-B25). It serves Allegiant Air, American Airlines, and Southwest Airlines.

=== Ticketing counters ===
As of August 26, 2025, Indianapolis International Airport has eight ticketing counters for all 11 airlines, prior to the November 2026 start of JetBlue flights.

- Counter 1 contains Allegiant Air and Sun Country Airlines.
- Counter 2 contains Delta Air Lines.
- Counter 3 contains Frontier Airlines.
- Counter 4 contains American Airlines.
- Counter 5 contains Air Canada and United Airlines.
- Counter 6 contains Aer Lingus, Alaska Airlines and Avelo Airlines.
- Counter 7 contains Southwest Airlines.
- Counter 8 is unoccupied.

=== Runways ===
The airport has three runways: two parallel and one crosswind. The crosswind runway, 14/32, is the shortest of the three at 7,278 feet (2,218 m), and the only original runway remaining. Historical aerial imagery shows that the original runway 5/23 became 5L/23R when 5R/23L was first constructed in the late 1980s and opened in 1989. When the current 5L/23R was built in the mid-1990s, the original 5L/23R runway was decommissioned. Portions of it are still visible near the site of the old terminal, including a segment where a former FedEx Boeing 727 still remains for fire training. The new terminal now occupies what used to be the southwestern end of the original 5/23 runway. The most recently refurbished runway is 5R/23L, completed in 2024 as part of a large expansion program. Indianapolis International Airport received a $26.6 million grant from the Federal Aviation Administration (FAA) on August 2, 2024. The grant was one of the largest among airports selected to receive the latest round of funding. The funding was applied to the reconstruction of IND's Runway 5R/23L and Taxiway D to improve safety. The project, which included adding LED runway and taxiway lighting was completed in late 2024. The Indianapolis Airport Authority (IAA) spent approximately $38.6 million with 34 diverse businesses for phase one and two. The construction project has created more than 3,200 jobs, across all three phases of the reconstruction. The north parallel runway (5L/23R) was refurbished in 2021 which allowed the south parallel runway reconstruction to proceed with minimal operational impact to the airfield.

Runway	Length	Width	Surface
5L/23R	11,200 feet (3,400 m)	150 feet (46 m)	Concrete
5R/23L	10,000 feet (3,000 m)	150 feet (46 m)	Concrete
14/32	7,278 feet (2,218 m)	150 feet (46 m)	Asphalt

The airport's current ~348-foot (106-meter) control tower opened in 2006 at a cost of about $38 million. The tower is the fourth tallest in the United States and the fourteenth tallest in the world.

=== Ground transportation ===
Ten rental car operations (Alamo, Avis, Budget, Dollar, Enterprise, Hertz, National, Payless, Sixt, and Thrifty) and the Ground Transportation Center (where information about limousine, shuttle bus, hotel courtesy vehicles and other transportation services such as IndyGo bus service can be obtained) are located on the first floor of the attached parking garage. All pick-ups and drop-offs of rental vehicles also occur here, eliminating the need for shuttling customers to and from individual companies' remote processing facilities. The 3.2-million-square-foot (300,000 m^{2}) five-floor parking garage has 6,400 public parking spaces and 2,200 rental car spaces. It features a light-filled center atrium complete with a piece of suspended artwork and contains moving sidewalks to speed pedestrians into and out of the terminal building itself.

The Blue Line, a bus rapid transit route also operated by IndyGo, will have its western terminus at the airport. Groundbreaking for the new line began in February 2025 and the route is expected to be completed by 2028.

== Airlines and destinations ==
=== Passenger ===
- General source:

Airlines	Destinations	Refs
Aer Lingus	Dublin	
Air Canada Express	Toronto–Pearson; Seasonal: Montréal–Trudeau (begins June 1, 2027)	
Alaska Airlines	Seattle/Tacoma	
Allegiant Air	Destin/Fort Walton Beach, Fort Lauderdale, Jacksonville (FL), Key West, Las Vegas, Orlando/Sanford, Punta Gorda (FL), Sarasota, St. Petersburg/Clearwater; Seasonal: Boston, Charleston (SC), Gulf Shores (begins May 20, 2027), Myrtle Beach, Portland (OR), Savannah	
American Airlines	Charlotte, Dallas/Fort Worth, Los Angeles, Miami, Phoenix–Sky Harbor; Seasonal: Cancún, Chicago–O'Hare, Philadelphia, Punta Cana, Washington–National	
American Eagle	Boston, Chicago–O'Hare, New York–JFK, New York–LaGuardia, Philadelphia, Washington–National; Seasonal: Charlotte, Dallas/Fort Worth, Miami	
Avelo Airlines	Charlotte/Concord, New Haven	
Delta Air Lines	Atlanta, Los Angeles, Minneapolis/St. Paul, Salt Lake City; Seasonal: Cancún, Detroit	
Delta Connection	Austin, Boston, Detroit, New York–JFK, New York–LaGuardia, Raleigh/Durham; Seasonal: Minneapolis/St. Paul, Orlando	
Frontier Airlines	Atlanta, Dallas/Fort Worth, Denver, Fort Lauderdale, Orlando	
JetBlue	Fort Lauderdale	
Southwest Airlines	Atlanta, Austin, Baltimore, Cancún, Chicago–Midway, Dallas–Love, Denver, Fort Lauderdale, Fort Myers, Houston–Hobby, Kansas City, Las Vegas, Los Angeles, Nashville, Orlando, Phoenix–Sky Harbor, San Diego, Sarasota, Tampa; Seasonal: Destin/Fort Walton Beach (begins March 13, 2027), Miami, Myrtle Beach (resumes June 5, 2027), Panama City (FL), San José del Cabo, San Juan, West Palm Beach (begins February 13, 2027)	
Sun Country Airlines	Seasonal: Minneapolis/St. Paul	
United Airlines	Denver, Houston–Intercontinental, San Francisco; Seasonal: Chicago–O'Hare, Washington–Dulles	
United Express	Chicago–O'Hare, Houston–Intercontinental, Newark, Washington–Dulles	

=== Cargo ===
Airlines	Destinations	Refs
Atlas Air	Luxembourg	
Cargolux	Luxembourg	
Castle Aviation	Akron–Canton, Hamilton (ON)	
FedEx Express	Allentown, Anchorage, Atlanta, Baltimore, Boston, Buffalo, Cedar Rapids/Iowa City, Charlotte, Chicago–O'Hare, Cleveland, Columbus–Rickenbacker, Dallas/Fort Worth, Denver, Detroit, Dublin, El Paso, Fort Lauderdale, Grand Rapids, Greensboro, Harrisburg, Hartford, Houston–Intercontinental, Jacksonville (FL), Kansas City, Knoxville, Liège, Los Angeles, Louisville, Memphis, Miami, Minneapolis/St. Paul, Montreal–Mirabel, Nashville, Newburgh, New Orleans, New York–JFK, Newark, Oakland, Ontario, Orlando, Paris–Charles de Gaulle, Philadelphia, Phoenix–Sky Harbor, Pittsburgh, Portland (OR), Raleigh/Durham, Salt Lake City, San Diego, San Jose (CA), Seattle/Tacoma, St. Louis, Syracuse, Tampa, Toronto–Pearson, Washington–Dulles	
FedEx Feeder	Columbus–Rickenbacker, South Bend	

=== Destination maps ===
Domestic destinations map
Domestic destinations from IND (excludes Alaska, Hawaii, and U.S. territories). Red dots represent year-round destinations; green dots represent seasonal destinations; blue dots represent future destinations.

International destinations map
International destinations from IND (includes Alaska, Hawaii, and U.S. territories). Red dots represent year-round destinations; green dots represent seasonal destinations; blue dots represent future destinations.

== Statistics ==
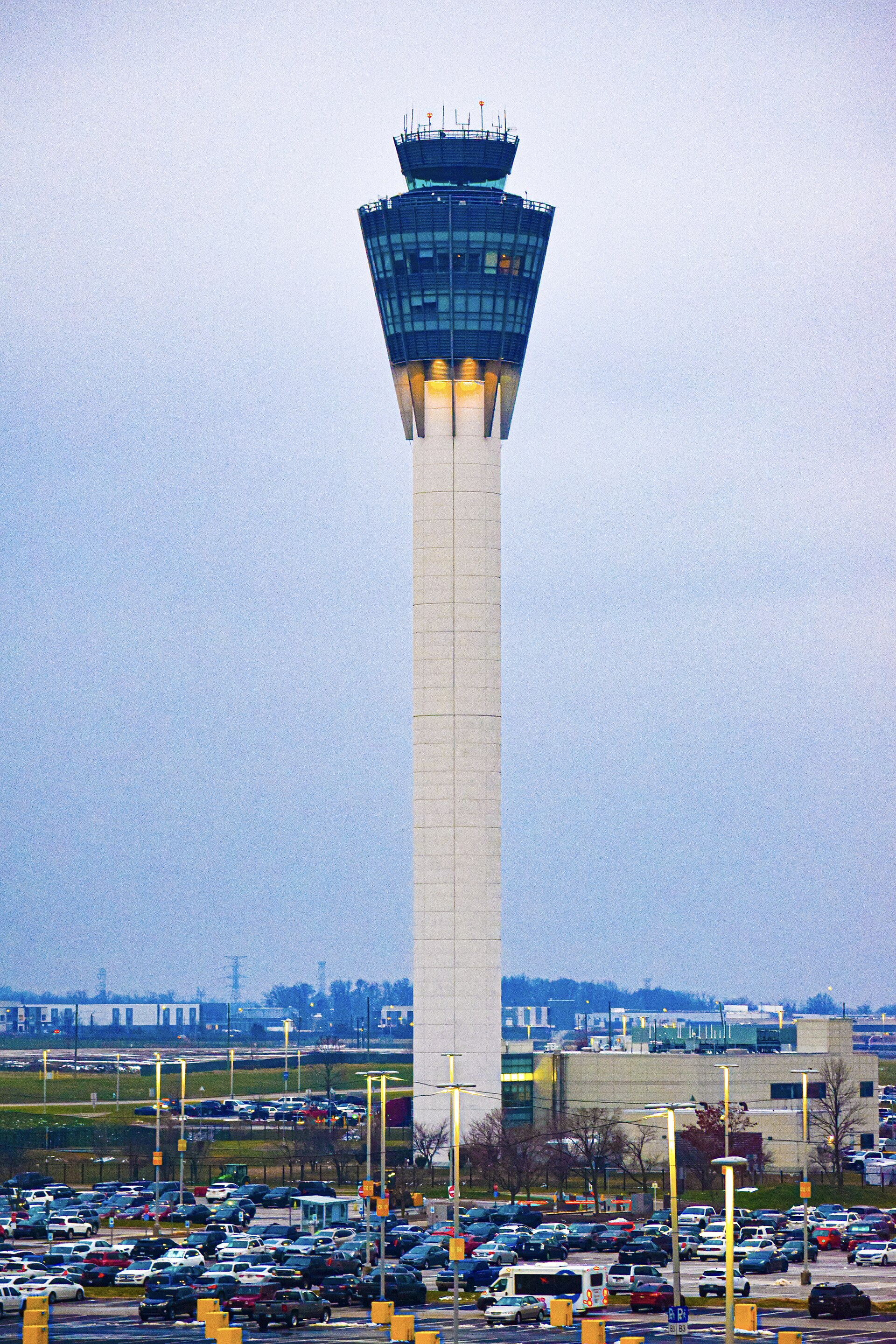
FAA control tower

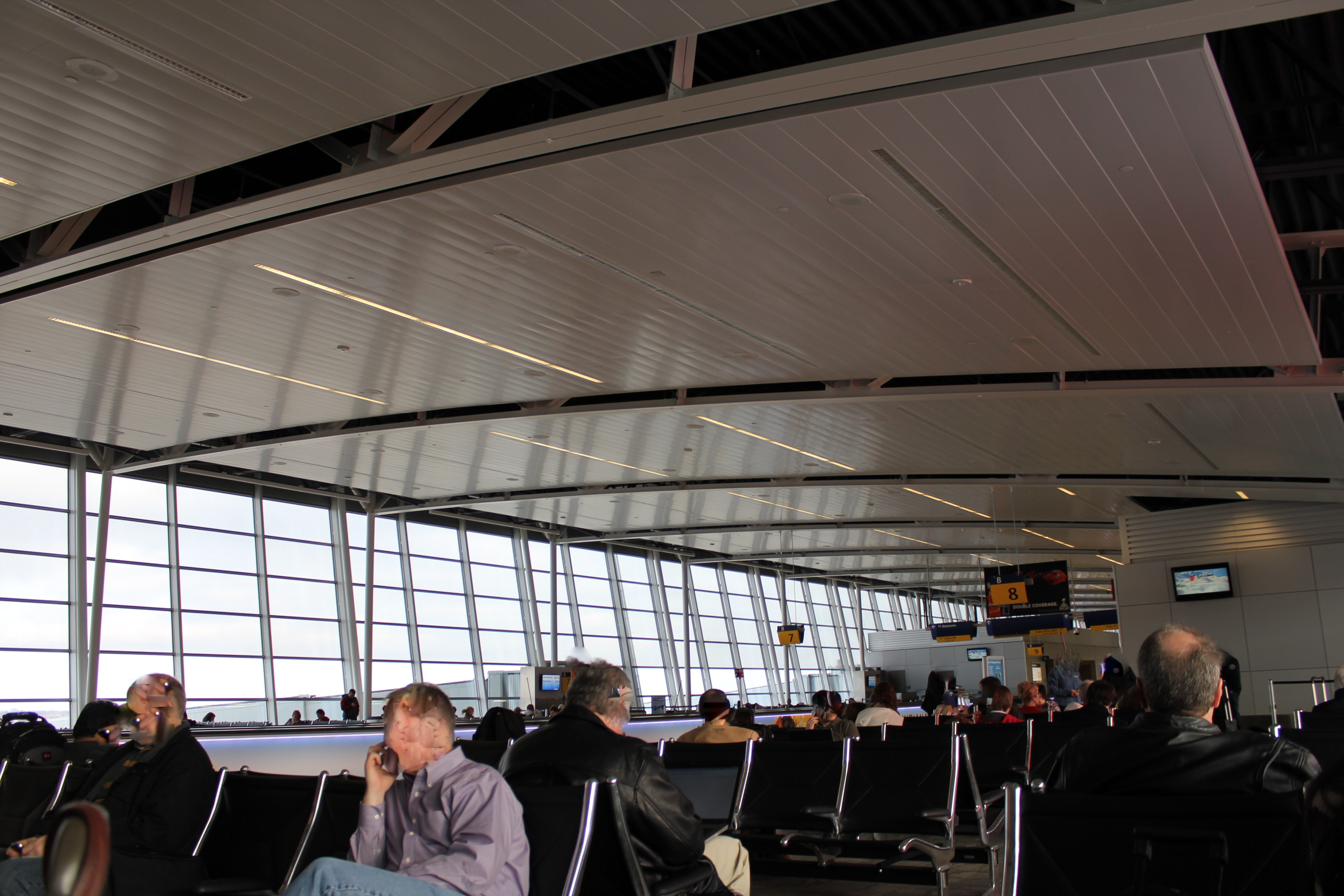
Indianapolis International Airport boarding area

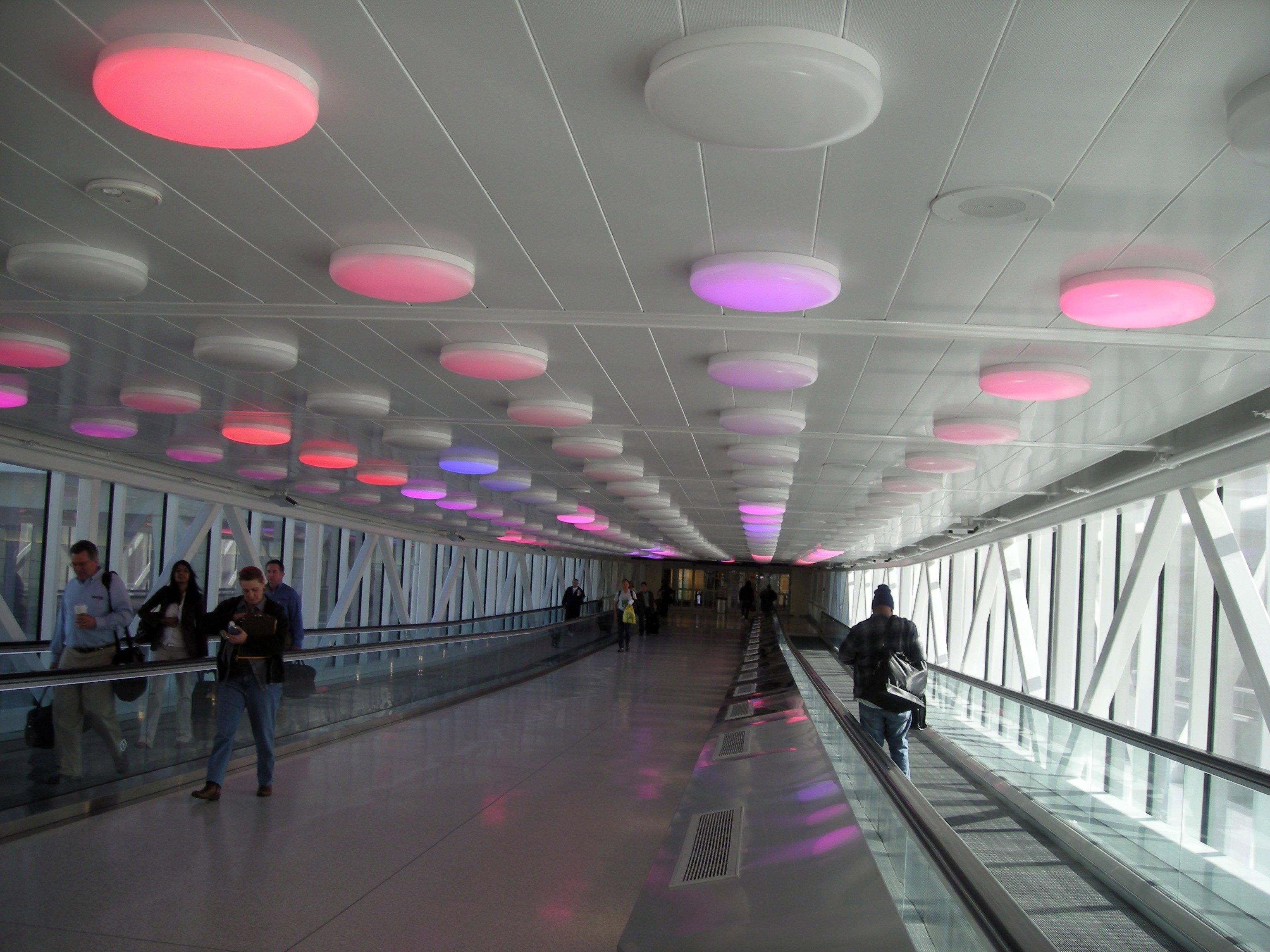
Walkway from the terminal to the parking garage with motion-activated lights

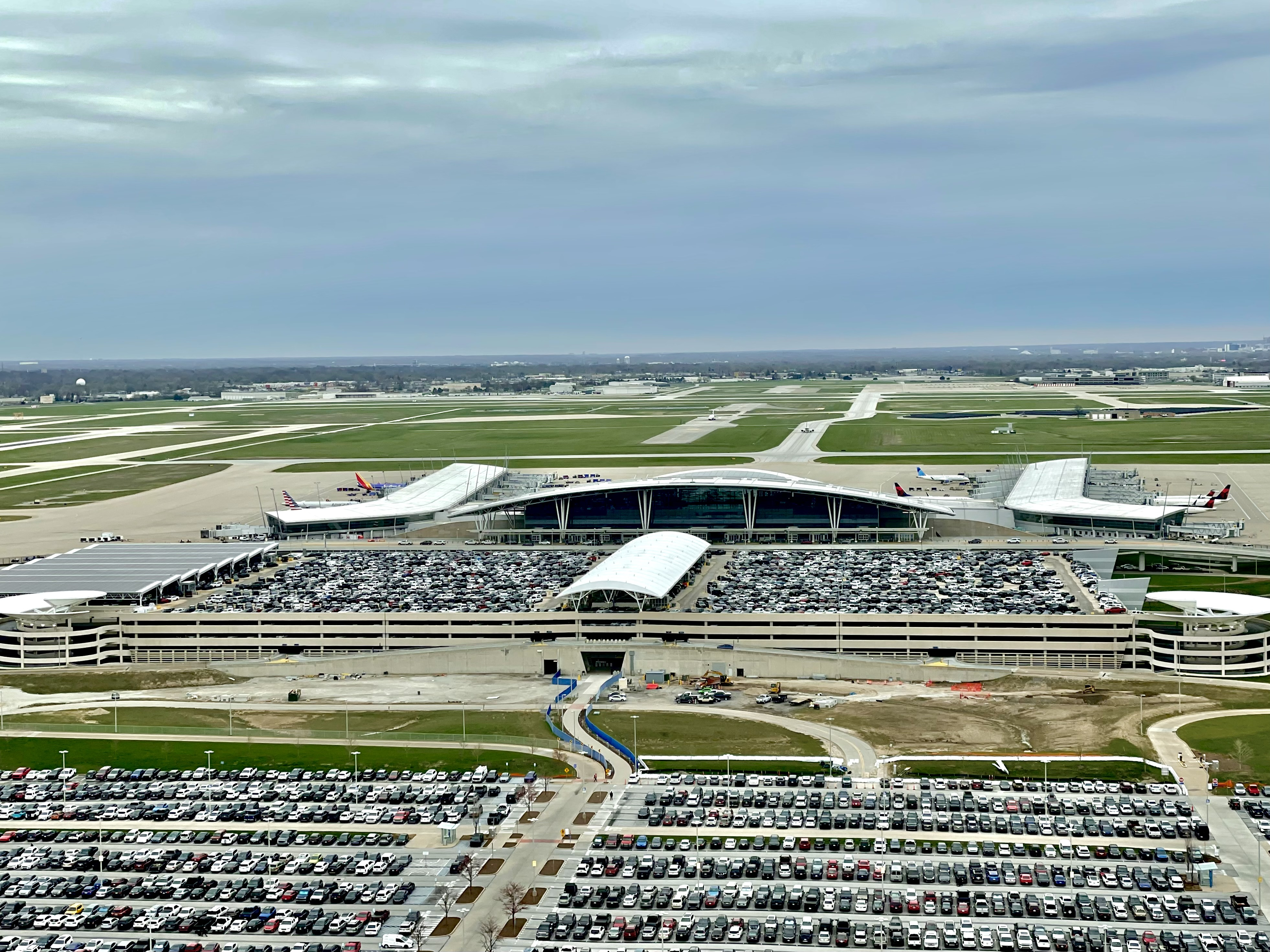
View from the FAA control tower of the parking garage and terminal building

=== Top destinations ===
Busiest domestic routes from IND (April 2025 - March 2026)
Rank	City	Passengers	Carriers
1	Atlanta, Georgia	446,870	Delta, Frontier, Southwest
2	Denver, Colorado	357,090	Frontier, Southwest, United
4	Orlando, Florida	317,290	Delta, Frontier, Southwest, Spirit
3	Chicago–O'Hare, Illinois	319,470	American, United
5	Dallas/Fort Worth, Texas	282,010	American, Frontier
6	Charlotte, North Carolina	247,810	American
7	Phoenix–Sky Harbor, Arizona	202,950	American, Southwest
8	Las Vegas, Nevada	187,610	Allegiant, Southwest, Spirit
9	New York–LaGuardia	155,820	American, Delta
10	Fort Lauderdale, Florida	150,410	Allegiant, Southwest, Spirit

=== Airline market share ===
Largest airlines at IND (April 2025 - March 2026)
Rank	Airline	Passengers	Share
1	Southwest Airlines	2,947,000	28.63%
2	American Airlines	1,650,000	16.03%
3	Republic Airways (Note: Operates flights under American Eagle, Delta Connection and United Express.)	1,529,000	14.86%
4	Delta Air Lines	1,162,000	11.29%
5	United Airlines	672,000	6.53%
	Others	2,334,000	22.68%

Largest cargo airlines at IND (YTD 2024)
Rank	Carriers	Cargo (pounds)
1	FedEx Express	1,778,752,450
2	Cargolux Airlines	15,819,204
3	Atlas Air	9,198,274
4	Mountain Air Cargo	5,591,179
5	Worldwide Fright Services	1,162,112
	Others	368,987

=== Annual traffic and cargo ===
IND Airport annual traffic and cargo data, 1996–present
Year	Passengers	Total cargo (lbs.)
1996	7,069,039	N/A
1997	7,171,845	N/A
1998	7,292,132	N/A
1999	7,463,536	N/A
2000	7,722,191	5,767,863,860
2001	7,238,744	6,308,730,500
2002	6,896,418	4,675,631,020
2003	7,361,060	4,553,635,744
2004	8,025,051	4,627,646,286
2005	8,524,442	5,089,384,528
2006	8,085,394	5,253,022,547
2007	8,272,289	5,304,551,447
2008	8,151,488	5,128,484,161
2009	7,465,719	4,575,418,342
2010	7,526,414	4,717,295,655
2011	7,478,835	4,813,314,835
2012	7,333,733	4,940,121,920
2013	7,217,051	5,268,916,355
2014	7,363,632	5,355,984,715
2015	7,998,086	5,324,737,760
2016	8,511,959	5,329,187,330
2017	8,791,828	5,138,500,501
2018	9,418,085	5,279,561,245
2019	9,537,377	5,301,991,570
2020	4,104,130	5,653,005,700
2021	7,175,979	7,160,133,175
2022	8,693,024	7,230,550,380
2023	9,788,867	5,151,459,190
2024	10,520,326	4,489,767,935
2025	10,616,093	3,704,477,571
2026	7,835,279 (Note: As of September 2026.)	
Source: Indianapolis International Airport

=== On-time performance (domestic major U.S. carriers only) ===
On-time performance by calendar year 2019–present
Year	Percent of on-time flights		Average delay (min)		Percent of cancelled flights
Year	Departures	Arrivals	Departures	Arrivals	Percent of cancelled flights
2019	82%	79%	74.13	65.49	1.86%
2020	86%	84%	67.34	57.00	6.56%
2021	84%	80%	65.34	61.75	1.46%
2022	80%	74%	68.85	64.37	3.16%
2023	83%	78%	73.07	64.59	1.35%
2024	82%	78%	72.75	66.40	1.32%
2025	82%	78%	72.24	63.50	0.28%

=== Airport employees ===
Number of airport employees at IND (December 2025)

Department	Number of employees	% of total
Parking	80	15.4%
Terminal services	72	13.8%
Fire	46	8.9%
Police	44	8.5%
Building maintantenance	38	7.3%
Airfield	36	7.0%
Public safety officers	36	6.9%
Airport security and dispatch	23	4.4%
Engineering	21	4.0%
Information technology	17	3.4%
Personnel	17	3.2%
Accounting and finance	13	2.5%
Operations	12	2.3%
Guest services	10	1.9%
Administration	8	1.4%
Marketing	6	1.2%
Reliever airports	6	1.2%
Audit services	5	1.0%
Conservation management	5	1.0%
Procurement	4	0.8%
Properties	4	0.8%
Retail	3	0.6%
IMC	3	0.6%
Legal	3	0.6%
Strategic alliance	3	0.6%
Executive	2	0.4%
Risk management	2	0.4%
Total employees	519	100.0%

== Accidents and incidents ==
- On September 9, 1969, Allegheny Airlines Flight 853 on a Boston – Baltimore – Cincinnati – Indianapolis – St. Louis route, collided in midair with a Piper Cherokee during its descent over Fairland, Indiana, in Shelby County. The McDonnell Douglas DC-9-31 crashed into a cornfield near London, Indiana, killing all 78 passengers and four crew members on board. The student pilot who was flying the Cherokee was also killed.
- On October 20, 1987, a United States Air Force A-7D Corsair II crashed into a Ramada Inn near the airport after the pilot was forced to eject due to an engine malfunction. Ten people were killed, nine of them hotel employees.
- On May 12, 1996, a Boeing 727-290 (N775AT), operated as American Trans Air Flight 406, carrying 104 passengers from Chicago–Midway experienced a decompression at 33,000 feet. The flight, which was bound for St. Petersburg/Clearwater made an emergency landing at the Indianapolis International Airport. All 112 passengers and crew survived with 11 minor injuries.

== See also ==
- List of airports in Indiana
- List of attractions and events in Indianapolis
- List of largest cargo airports in the United States
- List of tallest air traffic control towers in the United States
- List of the busiest airports in the United States
- List of tallest buildings in Indianapolis § Other structures
- Transportation in Indianapolis
