= Traditional Chinese Lions (Indianapolis Zoo) =

Public artwork in Indianapolis, Indiana, U.S.

- Year: 1988
- Type: White Marble
- Dimensions: 130 cm × 62 cm × 97 cm (53 in × 24.5 in × 38 in)
- Location: Indianapolis, Indiana, United States; 39°45′59.48″N 86°10′38.63″W
- Owner: Indianapolis Zoo

Traditional Chinese Lions is a public artwork located at the entrance to the Indianapolis Zoo, which is near downtown Indianapolis, Indiana, United States. The sculpture is made up of two traditional Chinese lions made of white marble, situated on white marble bases. Each lion is approximately 53 inches in height, 24.5 inches wide and 38 inches deep. Each base is approximately 36 inches in height, 24.5 inches wide, and 38 inches deep. Each sculpture is four tons. The pieces were made by four carvers from Fang Shan County, Zhejiang Province, China, as a gift from Indiana's sister province, Zhejiang. They were completed in January 1988 and dedicated on June 27, 1988, as part of the Indianapolis Zoo's opening within White River State Park.

== Description ==
The sculpture is made of two stylized Chinese lions set on pedestals, facing each other. The female lion on the west holds a little cub in her arms. The male lion on the east plays with an embroidery ball. The lions represent luck and happiness.

A gold inscription on the proper right side of the base of the female lion reads:

In memory of the establishment
of Province - State relations of
friendship between the Province
of Zhejiang, the Peoples Repub-
lic of China and the State of/
Indiana, the United States
Governor Shen Zulun
Zhejiang Province
P. R. China
January 1988

A gold inscription on the proper left side of the base of the male lion, in simplified Chinese characters, reads

中华人民共和国浙江省与美利坚合
众国印第安纳州建立友好关系纪念
浙江省省长 沈祖伦
一九八八年元月

which has a very similar meaning to the message on the other base. This is followed by the name of the company-manufacturer of the statues, which unfortunately is not very legible now.

== Condition ==
The Traditional Chinese Lions were surveyed in December 1992, as part of the Indiana Survey for the Smithsonian Institution's Save Outdoor Sculpture initiative. At the time their condition was described as, "treatment urgent." A September 2009 evaluation found the sculptures to be in poor condition, with multiple large cracks and numerous smaller fractures throughout, as well as repaired losses in the marble.

== Reciprocal gift ==
As a reciprocal gift, Governor Orr of Indiana offered Zhejiang a statue of an American bison. The sculpture was carved by the Boruff brothers out of a block of limestone from Bedford, Indiana. The project was paid for by donations, primarily from several banks in Indianapolis and Bedford.

== See also ==
- Chinese guardian lions
- American Bison (Arnold)
- North American Plains Animals (Arnold)
