= Indianapolis Zoo =

Zoo, aquarium, and botanical garden in Indiana, US

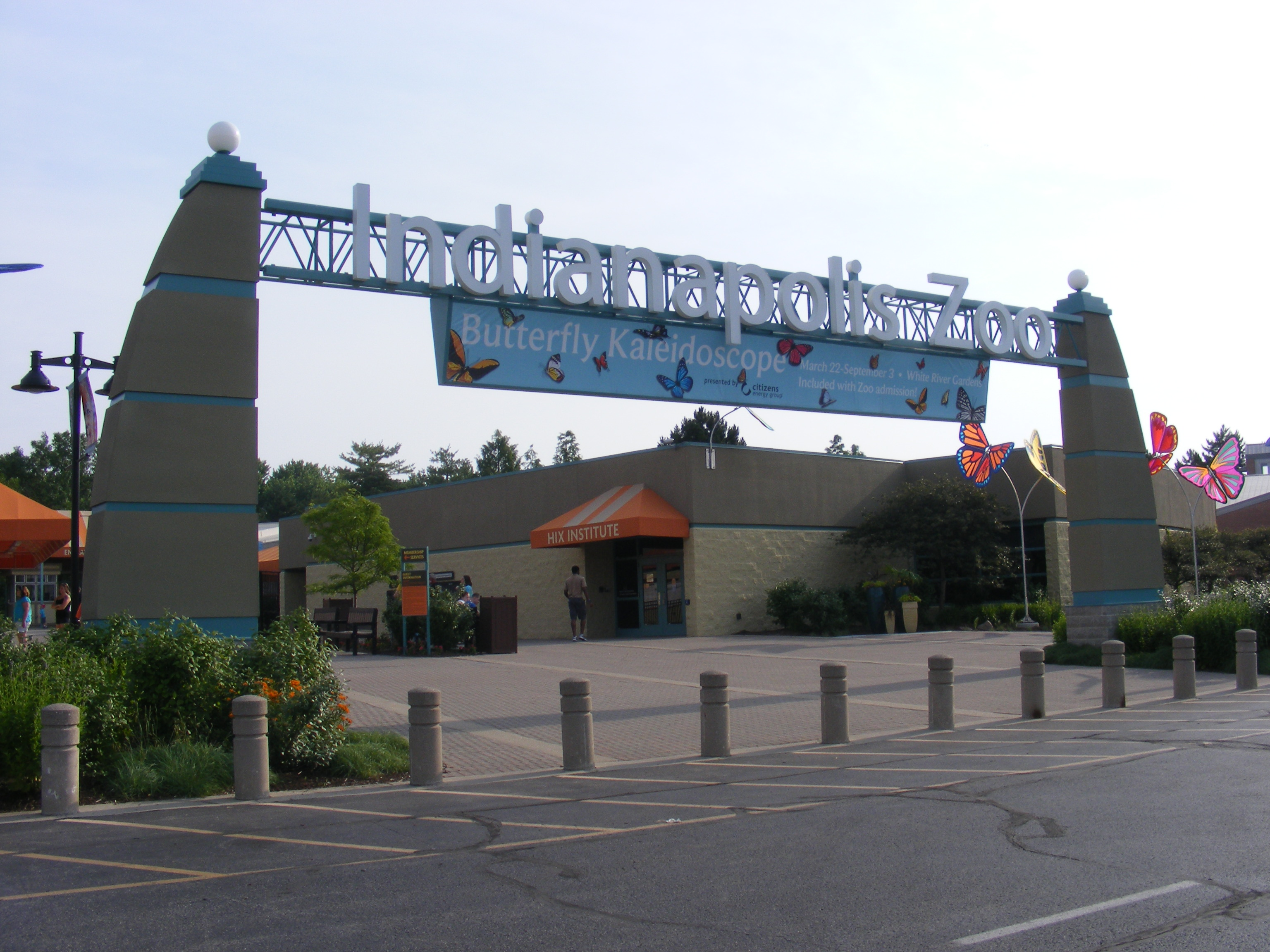
- Main entrance in 2013
- Interactive map of Indianapolis Zoo
- 39°46′1″N 86°10′37″W
- Date opened: April 18, 1964; 62 years ago (Washington Park site); June 11, 1988; 38 years ago (current site)
- Location: White River State Park, Indianapolis, Indiana, U.S.
- Land area: 64 acres (26 ha)
- No. of animals: 1,553
- No. of species: 244
- Annual visitors: 1.2 million
- Memberships: AAM, WAZA
- Major exhibits: Deserts, Flights of Fancy, Forests, Oceans, Plains, Simon Skjodt International Orangutan Center, White River Gardens
- Owner: Indianapolis Zoological Society
- Director: Dr. Robert W. Shumaker (President & CEO)
- Public transit: 8
- Website: www.indianapoliszoo.com

The Indianapolis Zoo is a 93-acre (38 ha) non-profit zoo, public aquarium, and botanical garden in Indianapolis, Indiana, United States. Incorporated in 1944, the Indianapolis Zoological Society established the first zoo at George Washington Park in 1964. The current zoo opened in 1988 at White River State Park near downtown Indianapolis. It is among the largest privately funded zoos in the U.S.

The institution is accredited by the American Alliance of Museums and is a member of the World Association of Zoos and Aquariums. The zoo lost its accreditation with the Association of Zoos and Aquariums in September 2026. It was the first in the U.S. to receive triple accreditation as a zoo, aquarium, and botanical garden. The zoo is a leader in animal conservation and research, recognized for its biennial Indianapolis Prize and as home to the Global Center for Species Survival through its partnership with the International Union for Conservation of Nature.

In 2020, the zoo housed more than 1,400 animals of 235 species while the adjoining White River Gardens contained more than 50,000 plants of over 5,000 species, respectively. The Indianapolis Zoo is a significant economic driver in the city and among its most visited attractions. In 2021, the zoo employed 700 people and welcomed 1.2 million guests, contributing nearly $60 million annually to the city's economy.

== Site and access ==
The Indianapolis Zoo is situated within White River State Park, about 1 mi (1.6 km) west of Monument Circle on the eastern edge of the Near Westside neighborhood area. The White River hugs the zoo's northern and eastern boundaries, physically separating the facility from downtown Indianapolis.

Visitors arriving by car access the parking lot from West Washington Street, which forms the zoo's southern boundary. Parking is free for zoo members and $10 for non-members. The zoo is accessible to pedestrians, bicyclists, or other non-motorists via the White River Trail which runs between its namesake river and the zoo's property. Public transportation serves the facility via IndyGo's Route 8.

The former Washington Street Bridge spanning the White River was completed in 1916 as part of the National Road. In 1984, construction began on the realignment of Washington Street to the south to make way for the zoo's development. The bridge was preserved and renovated in the 1990s to carry non-motorized traffic between downtown and the zoo's east entrance at White River Gardens.

== History ==
=== Beginnings ===
Limited in number and species, Indianapolis's earliest captive animals were located in small exhibits at various city parks. Brookside Park was home to a collection of birds, including cockatoos, parrots, and macaws. Garfield Park contained a bear and several monkeys. Riverside Park exhibited a pair of sea lions. By 1906, the Indianapolis Parks Department consolidated the various exhibits into a single site at Riverside. The zoological garden's demise came amid wartime conservation efforts as the U.S. entered World War I. The park board began selling the animals in 1916 and the zoo was officially closed in 1917.

In 1944, Lowell Nussbaum, columnist for the Indianapolis Times, and later The Indianapolis Star, began to advocate for a zoo through his column "Inside Indianapolis", which inspired the incorporation of the Indianapolis Zoological Society in October 1944. Soon after, members outlined plans for the zoo. Group members were adamant that "the zoo will rely on admissions, in-park sales, contributions, and memberships to support the zoo". However, it would not be until 20 years later, in 1964, that the zoo would open to the public.

=== Washington Park ===
The Indianapolis Zoo opened as Washington Park Children's Zoo on April 18, 1964, at Washington Park on East 30th Street. In its first year, the new attraction drew more than 270,000 visitors. The zoo originally featured an Asian elephant, penguins, kangaroos, foxes, raccoons, camels, bison, deer, lambs, tortoises, llamas, prairie dogs, pygmy goats, and buffalo exhibits. In 1965, the zoo became one of few in the country to employ a full-time education staff. By the 20th anniversary of the zoo, its animal collection had doubled in size and it was determined that the zoo needed a new location where it could continue to expand.

=== Move to White River State Park ===
In 1982, international zoo, aquarium, and wildlife authorities gathered to set goals for establishing the new zoo. It was determined that a zoo should not only be a place to see animals, but also an institution of conservation and education. That same year, White River State Park was announced as the new site of the zoo. The groundbreaking at the new downtown location was held in September 1985. The old zoo closed in 1987. The current zoo at White River State Park opened on June 11, 1988, with a size of 64 acres (26 ha).

Jeffrey Bonner began his tenure as the zoo's president and chief executive officer in January 1993.

After the construction of the Waters building and the Dolphin Pavilion, the zoo earned AZA accreditation as an aquarium as well as a zoo. In 1996, the Indianapolis Zoo became the first institution to be triple-accredited as a zoo, aquarium, and botanical garden. White River Gardens was considered a separate facility from 1999 to 2006, but now is included as part of the zoo.

The world's first successful artificial insemination of an African elephant occurred at the zoo in 2000.

=== Time under Michael Crowther (2002–2019) ===
Michael Crowther was appointed president and chief executive officer of the zoo in June 2002. During his tenure, the zoo experienced a nearly 240 percent increase in annual revenue, a 700 percent increase in the value of its endowment, a 27 percent increase in total assets, and a 34 percent rise in attendance. Under Crowther's leadership, numerous capital projects were undertaken and the Indianapolis Prize was established.

A $10 million renovation of the Dolphin Pavilion opened in May 2005, including an underwater dolphin viewing dome and new programming. The following season, a $400,000 renovation of the Deserts Dome was completed. The zoo invested nearly $10 million in a redesigned Oceans building, which debuted in 2007.

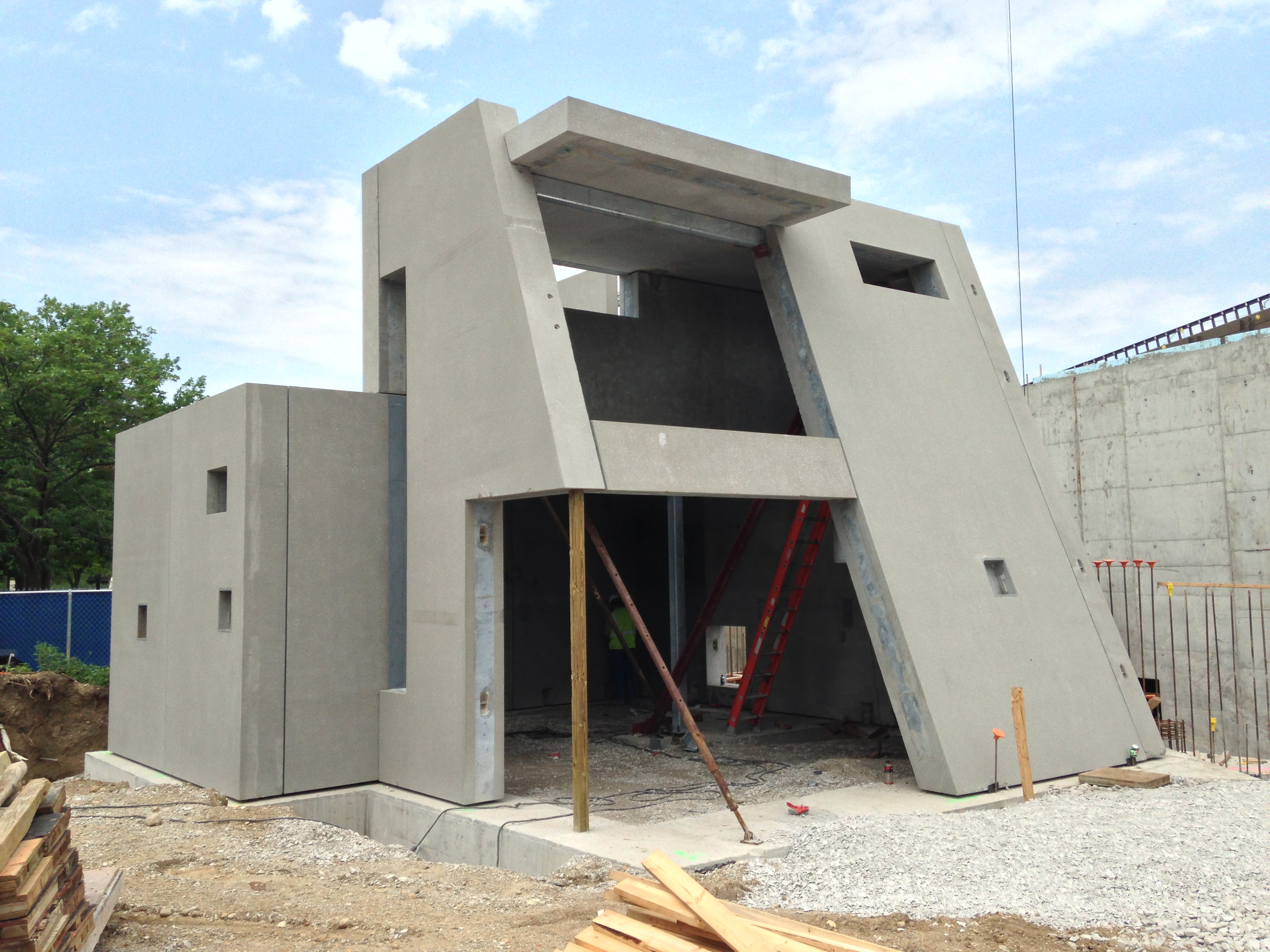
A portion of the Simon Skjodt International Orangutan Center under construction in 2013

In September 2012, the zoo broke ground on the $21.5 million Simon Skjodt International Orangutan Center, serving as both an exhibit and research hub to assist with orangutan conservation. The project was partially funded by a $2 million donation from the family foundation of Dean and Barbara White. The exhibit houses nine orangutans and features a 90-foot (27 m)-tall viewing atrium. The Myrta Pulliam Hutan Trail, a series of cableways and platforms, allows the orangutans to travel throughout the zoo at their leisure. The exhibit opened Memorial Day weekend 2014.

In October 2019, the zoo acquired two parcels for a combined 28.2 acres (11.4 ha) south of Washington Street. One parcel, consisting of 12.2 acres (4.9 ha) of the former General Motors plant site, was donated to the zoo by Indianapolis-based developer Ambrose Property Group, while the second parcel—consisting of 16 acres (6.5 ha) of undeveloped land—was purchased from Ambrose for $3 million. Upon the announcement, zoo officials said the first parcel would "almost immediately" be used as an overflow parking lot. Further, a zoo spokesperson said the existing 13-acre (5.3 ha) surface parking lot would "likely be converted into new exhibits and other zoo programming," though years of planning were anticipated.

=== Time under Robert Shumaker (2020–2026) ===
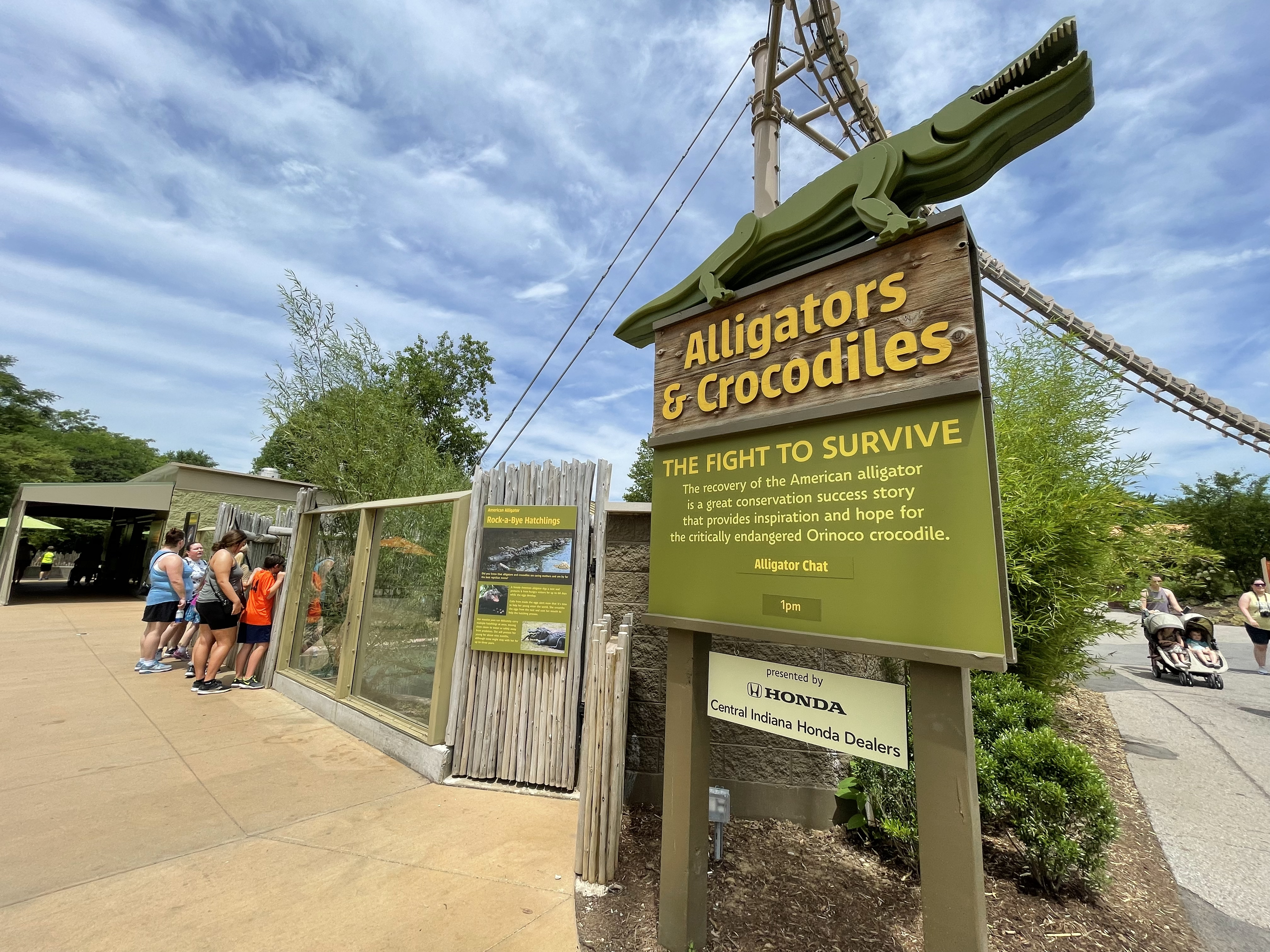
Alligators & Crocodiles: The Fight to Survive in 2022

Dr. Robert Shumaker was appointed president in 2016 and assumed the role of chief executive officer in January 2020, following Crowther's retirement.

Since 2020, the zoo has debuted three exhibitions: Elephant Tembo Camp (2020), Alligators & Crocodiles: The Fight to Survive (2021), and Kangaroo Crossing (2022), with a total investment of nearly $4.8 million.

In December 2022, officials announced a $53 million fundraising campaign, the largest in the zoo's history. The campaign will finance capital projects, including the construction of a $5 million entry plaza and welcome center and a $13 million home for the Global Center for Species Survival. Construction began in September 2021 and is projected to conclude in May 2023. A $25 million International Chimpanzee Complex opened in May 2024.

== Biomes and exhibits ==
The Indianapolis Zoo is organized around the concept of biomes, or areas of the planet with similar climates, plants, and animals. Animals at the Indianapolis Zoo are clustered in groups with similar habitats, which define each biome. The "‡" symbol denotes animals that are part of the zoo's captive breeding program, as recognized by the Association of Zoos and Aquariums' Species Survival Plan.

=== Deserts ===
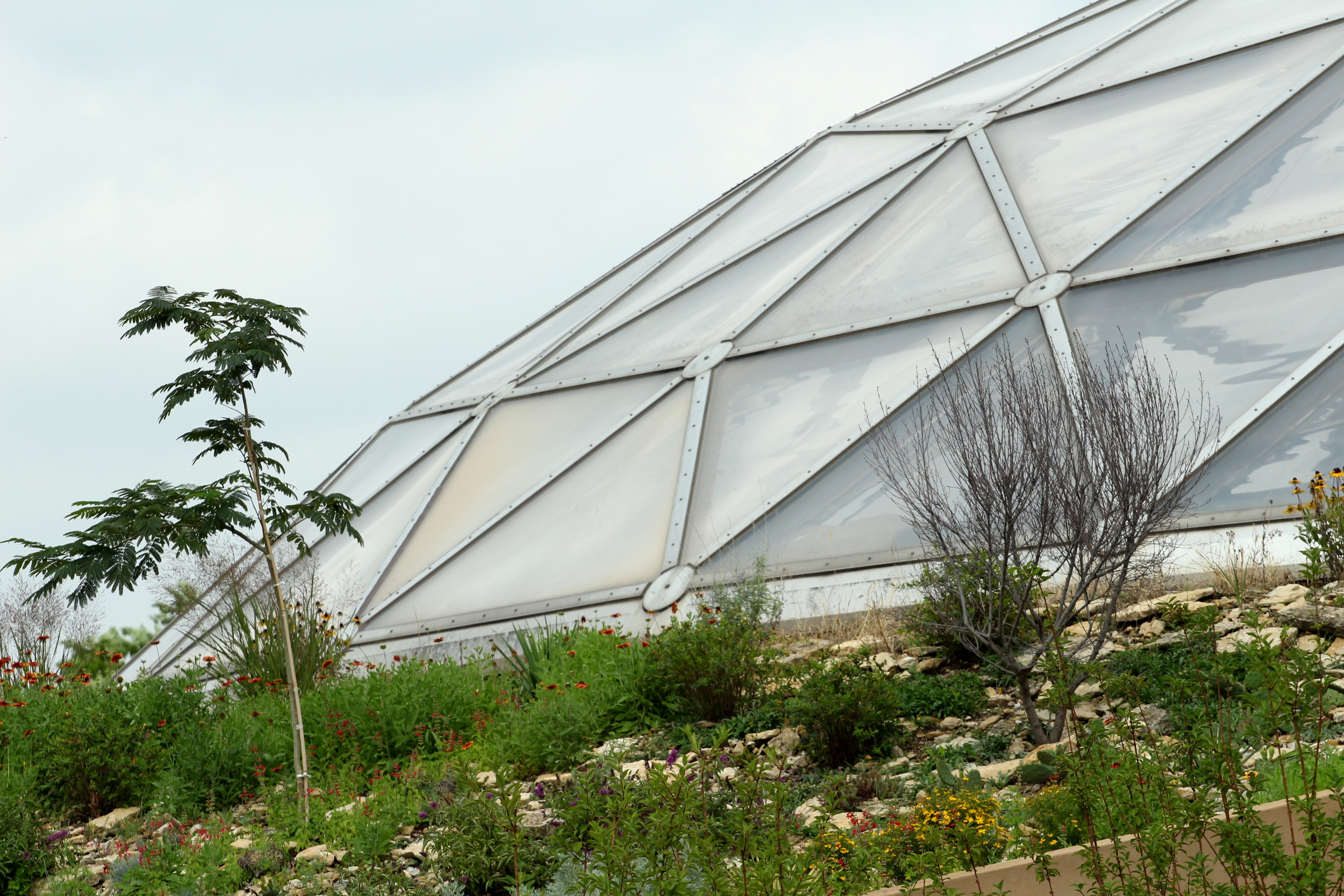
Outside of the Desert Dome

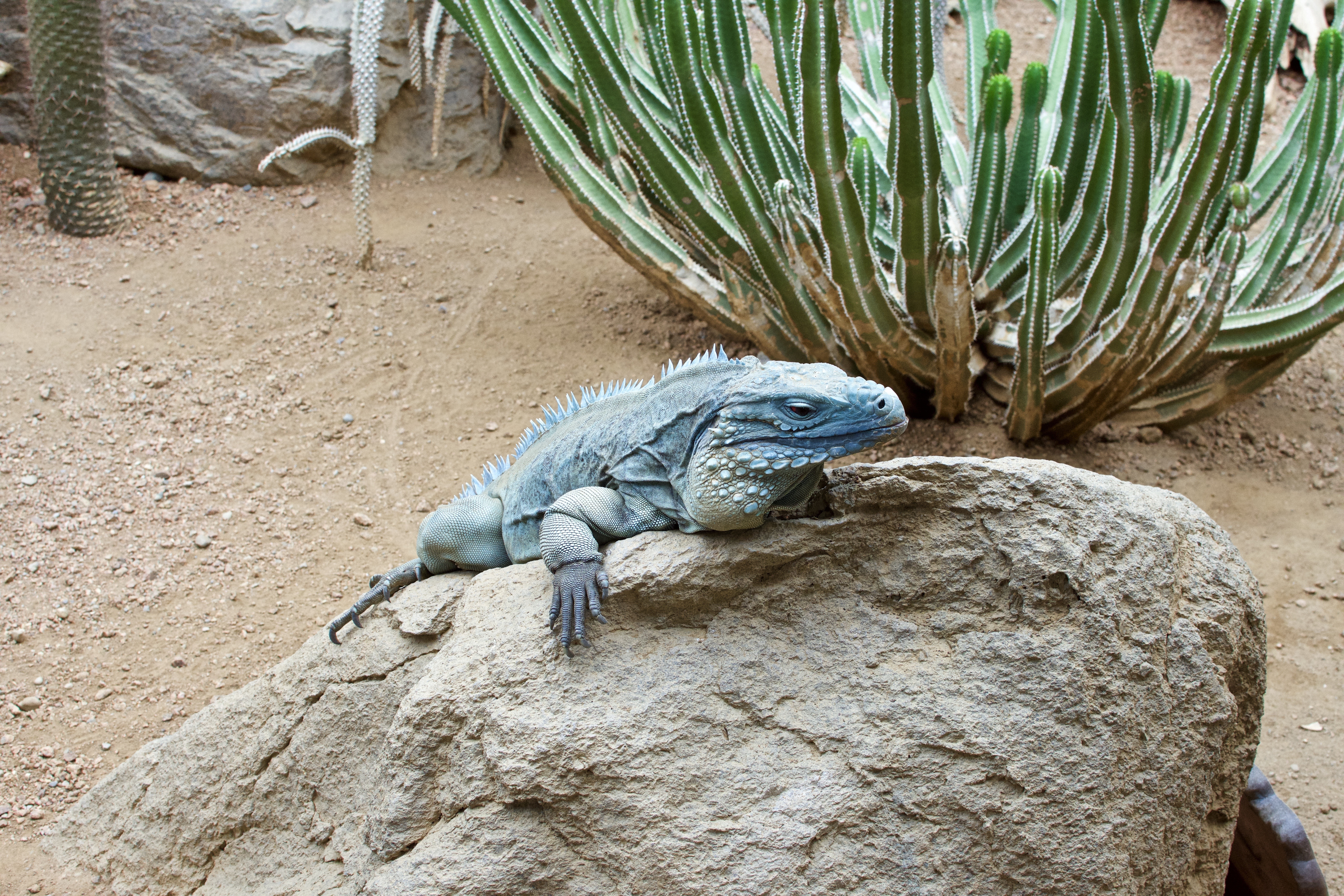
A blue iguana in the zoo's Deserts Dome

As of April 2026, the Deserts biome contains the following:

Deserts Dome

- African pancake tortoise (Malacochersus tornieri)‡
- Aldabra tortoise (Aldabrachelys gigantea)
- Blue-tongued skink (Tiliqua multifasciata)
- Burmese star tortoise (Geochelone platynota)‡
- Central bearded dragon (Pogona vitticeps)
- Colorado River toad (Incilius alvarius)
- Common chuckwalla (Sauromalus ater)
- Eastern snake-necked turtle (Chelodina longicollis)
- Egyptian tortoise (Testudo kleinmanni)‡
- Grand Cayman blue iguana (Cyclura lewisi)‡
- Jamaican iguana (Cyclura collei)‡
- Leopard tortoise (Stigmochelys pardalis)
- Mali spiny-tailed lizard (Uromastyx dispar)
- Meerkat (Suricata suricatta)‡
- Radiated tortoise (Astrochelys radiata)‡
- Rhinoceros iguana (Cyclura cornuta)
- Sand cat (Felis margarita)‡
- Spider tortoise (Pyxis arachnoides)‡
- Sudan plated lizard (Broadleysaurus major)

Size, Speed & Venom: Extreme Snakes

- Aruba Island rattlesnake (Crotalus unicolor)‡
- Banded rock rattlesnake (Crotalus lepidus klauberi)
- Black mamba (Dendroaspis polylepis)
- Blood python (Python brongersmai)
- Brazilian rainbow boa (Epicrates cenchria)
- Burmese python (Python bivittatus)
- Cape cobra (Naja nivea)
- Eastern copperhead (Agkistrodon contortrix)
- Eastern massasauga (Sistrurus catenatus)‡
- Eyelash palm viper (Bothriechis schlegelii)
- Gila monster (Heloderma suspectum)
- Jamaican boa (Chilabothrus subflavus)‡
- Northern copperhead (Agkistrodon contortrix)
- Reticulated python (Malayopython reticulatus)
- Santa Catalina Island rattlesnake (Crotalus catalinensis)‡
- Sidewinder (Crotalus cerastes)
- Spotted python (Antaresia maculosa)
- Timber rattlesnake (Crotalus horridus)
- Western cottonmouth (Agkistrodon piscivorus)
- Western green mamba (Dendroaspis viridis)
- Zebra spitting cobra (Naja nigricincta)

=== Flights of Fancy ===
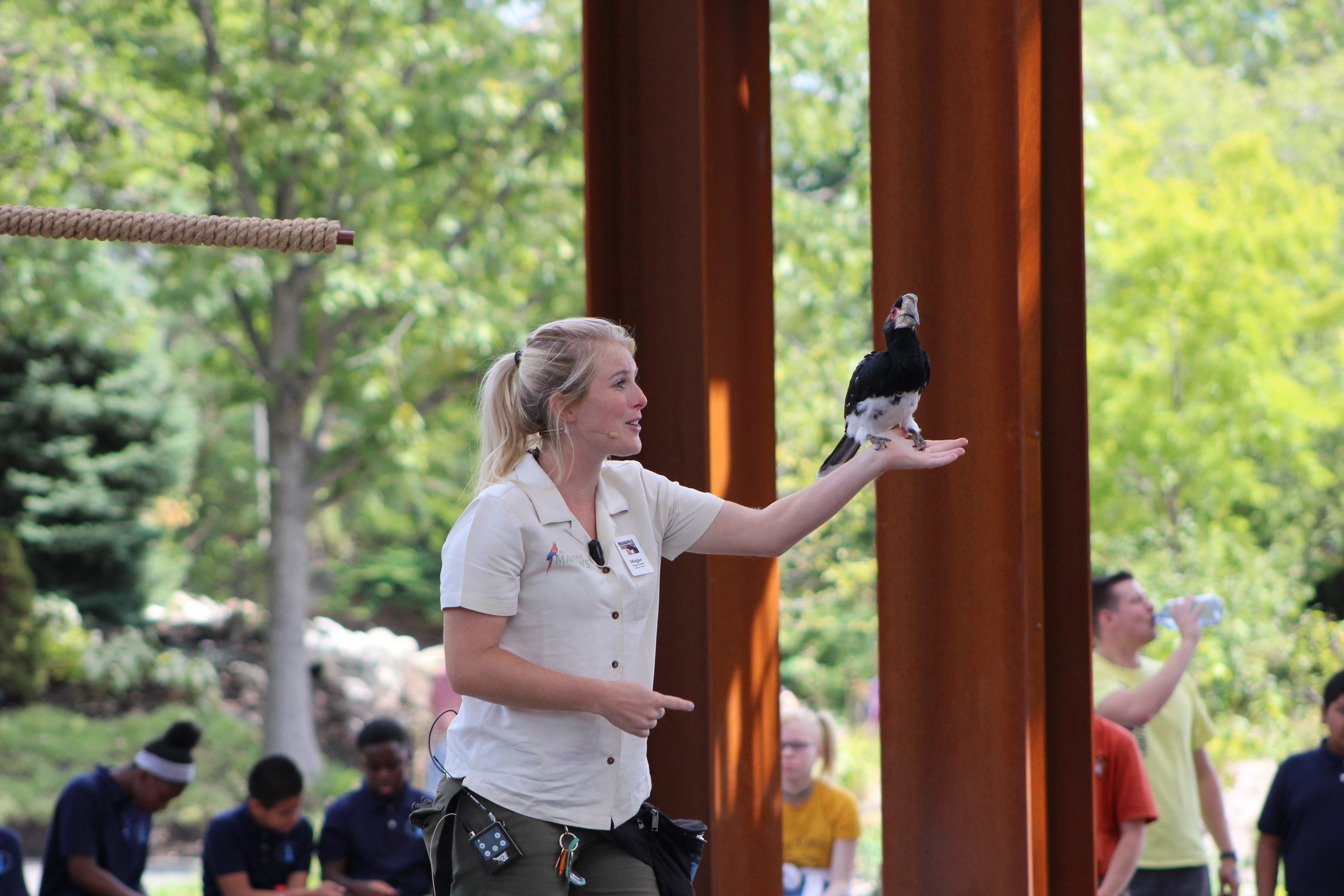
Hornbill (Bucerotidae) with zookeeper at a live show

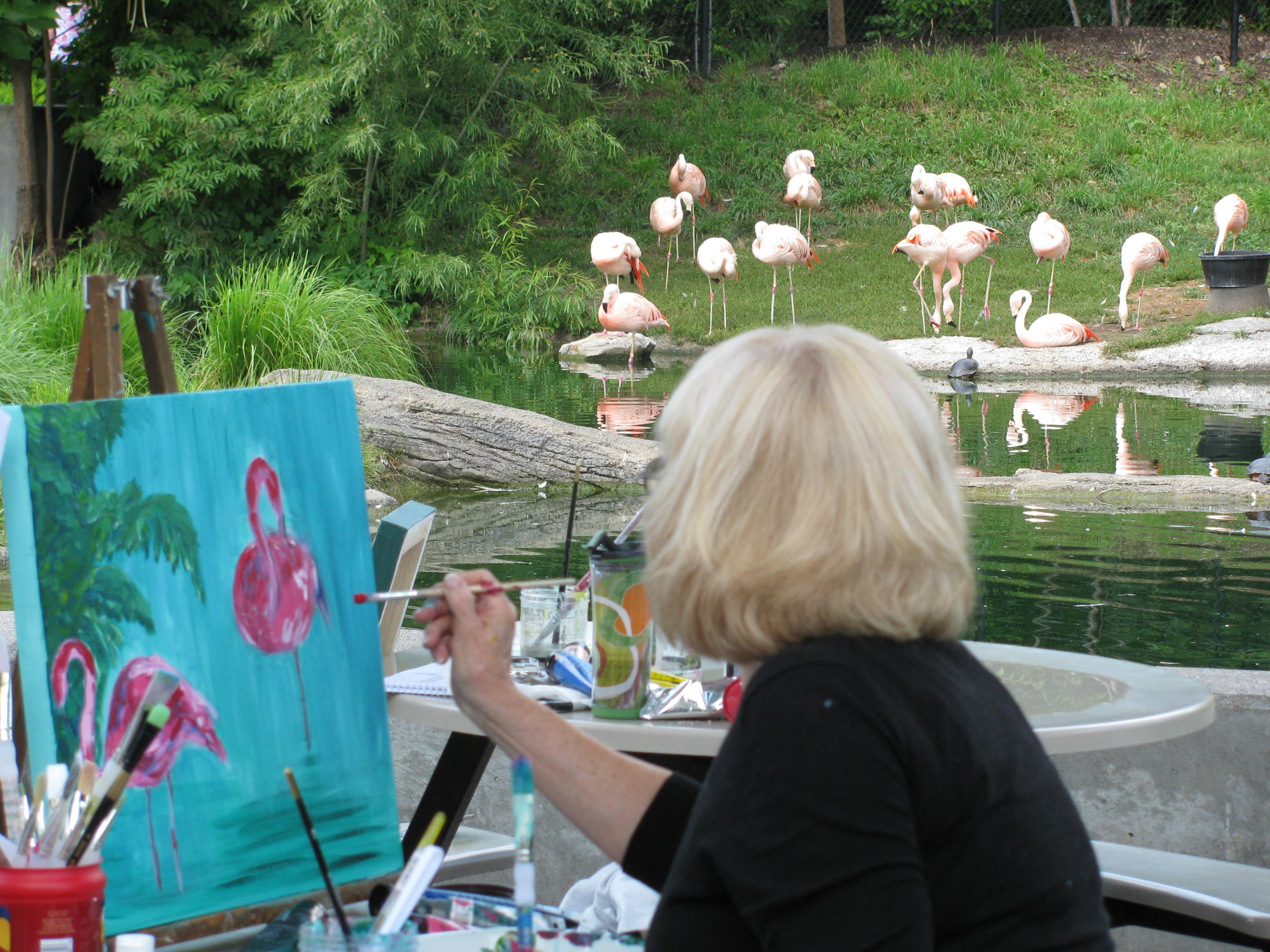
An artist painting at the flamingo exhibit

As of April 2026, Flights of Fancy contains the following:

Budgie and Lorikeet Aviaries

- Black-capped lory (Lorius lory)
- Blue-bellied roller (Coracias cyanogaster)‡
- Budgerigar (Melopsittacus undulatus)
- Cockatiel (Nymphicus hollandicus)
- Coconut lorikeet (Trichoglossus haematodus)
- Crested coua (Coua cristata)‡
- Forsten's lorikeet (Trichoglossus forsteni)
- Green wood hoopoe (Phoeniculus purpureus)‡
- Helmeted guineafowl (Numida meleagris)
- Rainbow lorikeet (Trichoglossus moluccanus)
- Red-collared lorikeet (Trichoglossus rubritorquis)
- Red lory (Eos bornea)
- Superb starling (Lamprotornis superbus)
- Taveta golden weaver (Ploceus castaneiceps)
- Vulturine guineafowl (Acryllium vulturinum)

Flamingo Pool

- Caribbean flamingo (Phoenicopterus ruber)‡
- Chilean flamingo (Phoenicopterus chilensis)‡

Other animals

- Arctic fox (Vulpes lagopus)

=== Forests ===
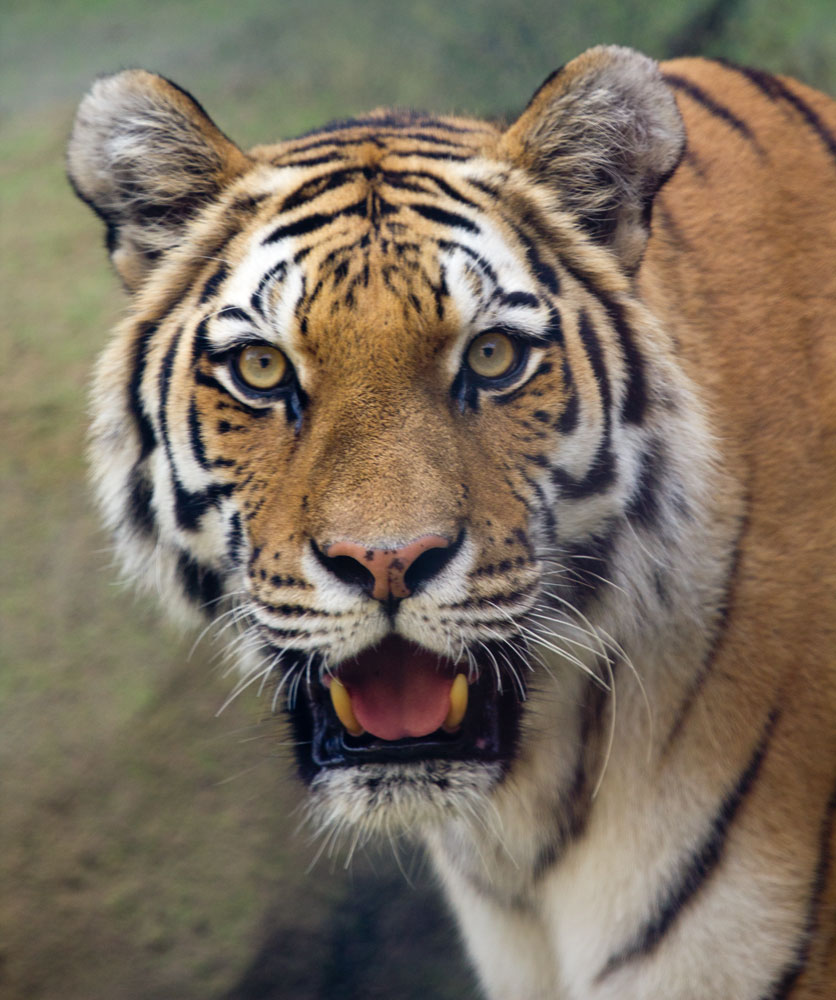
Amur tiger in the zoo's Forests biome

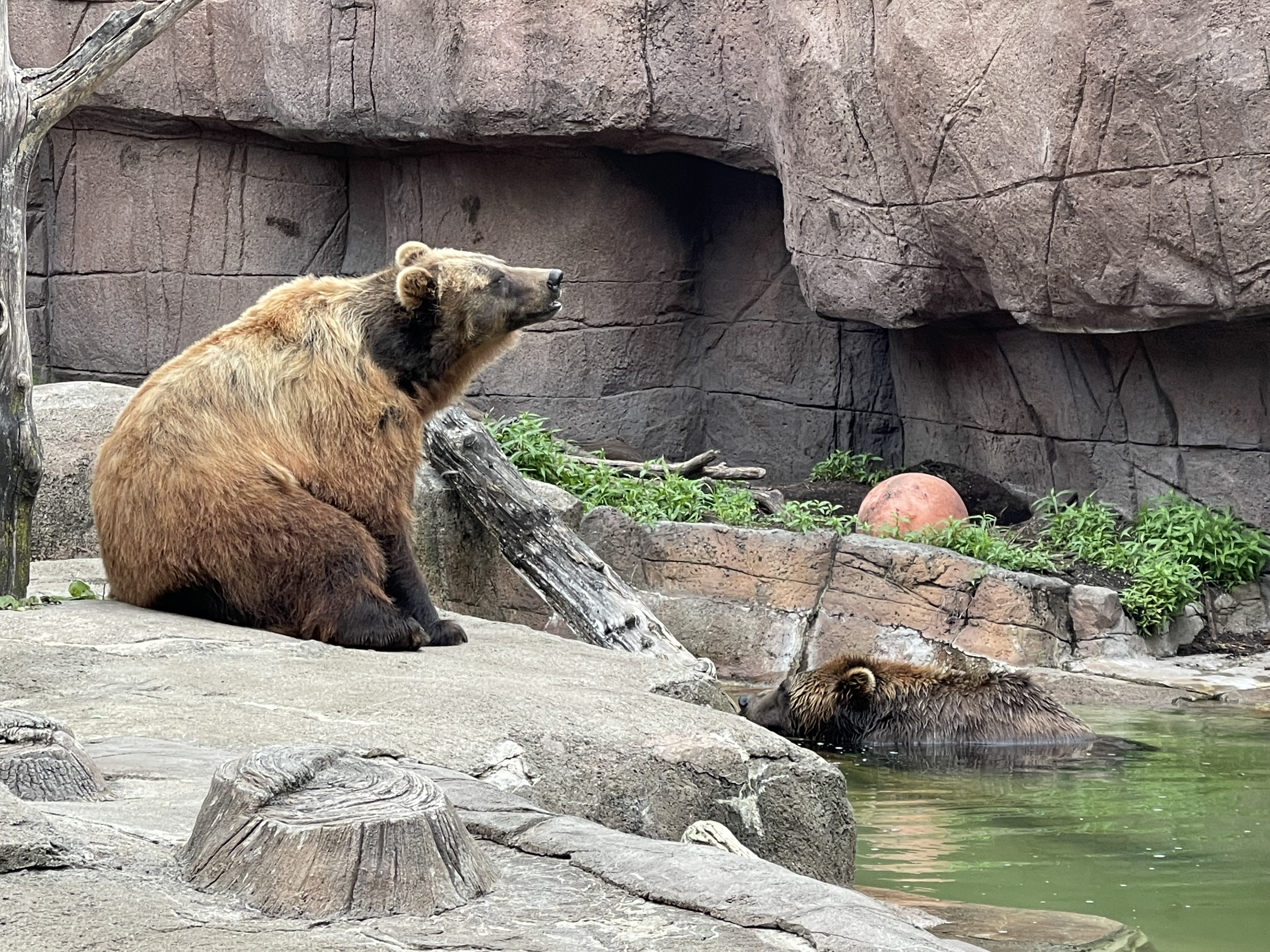
Kodiak bears (Ursus arctos middendorffi)

As of April 2026, the Forests biome contains the following:

Alligators & Crocodiles: The Fight to Survive

- American alligator (Alligator mississippiensis)
- Orinoco crocodile (Crocodylus intermedius)

International Chimpanzee Complex

- Chimpanzee (Pan troglodytes)‡

Kangaroo Crossing

- Citron-crested cockatoo (Cacatua citrinocristata)
- Galah (Eolophus roseicapilla)
- Goffin's cockatoo (Cacatua goffiniana)
- Little corella (Cacatua sanguinea)
- Long-billed corella (Cacatua tenuirostris)
- Major Mitchell's cockatoo (Cacatua leadbeateri)
- Palm cockatoo (Probosciger aterrimus)
- Red kangaroo (Osphranter rufus)‡
- Salmon-crested cockatoo (Cacatua moluccensis)
- Sulphur-crested cockatoo (Cacatua galerita)
- Yellow-crested cockatoo (Cacatua sulphurea)

Magnificent Macaws

- Blue-and-gold macaw (Ara ararauna)
- Blue-throated macaw (Ara glaucogularis)‡
- Great green macaw (Ara ambiguus)
- Green-winged macaw (Ara chloropterus)
- Hyacinth macaw (Anodorhynchus hyacinthinus)‡
- Military macaw (Ara militaris)
- Scarlet macaw (Ara macao)

Other animals

- Alaskan brown bear (Ursus arctos middendorffi)
- Bald eagle (Haliaeetus leucocephalus)
- Capybara (Hydrochoerus hydrochaeris)‡
- Cotton-top tamarin (Saguinus oedipus)‡
- Golden eagle (Aquila chrysaetos)
- Lar gibbon (Hylobates lar)‡
- Red panda (Ailurus fulgens)‡

Simon Skjodt International Orangutan Center

- Bornean orangutan (Pongo pygmaeus)‡
- Sumatran orangutan (Pongo abelii)‡

Tiger Forest

- Amur tiger (Panthera tigris altaica)‡

=== Oceans ===
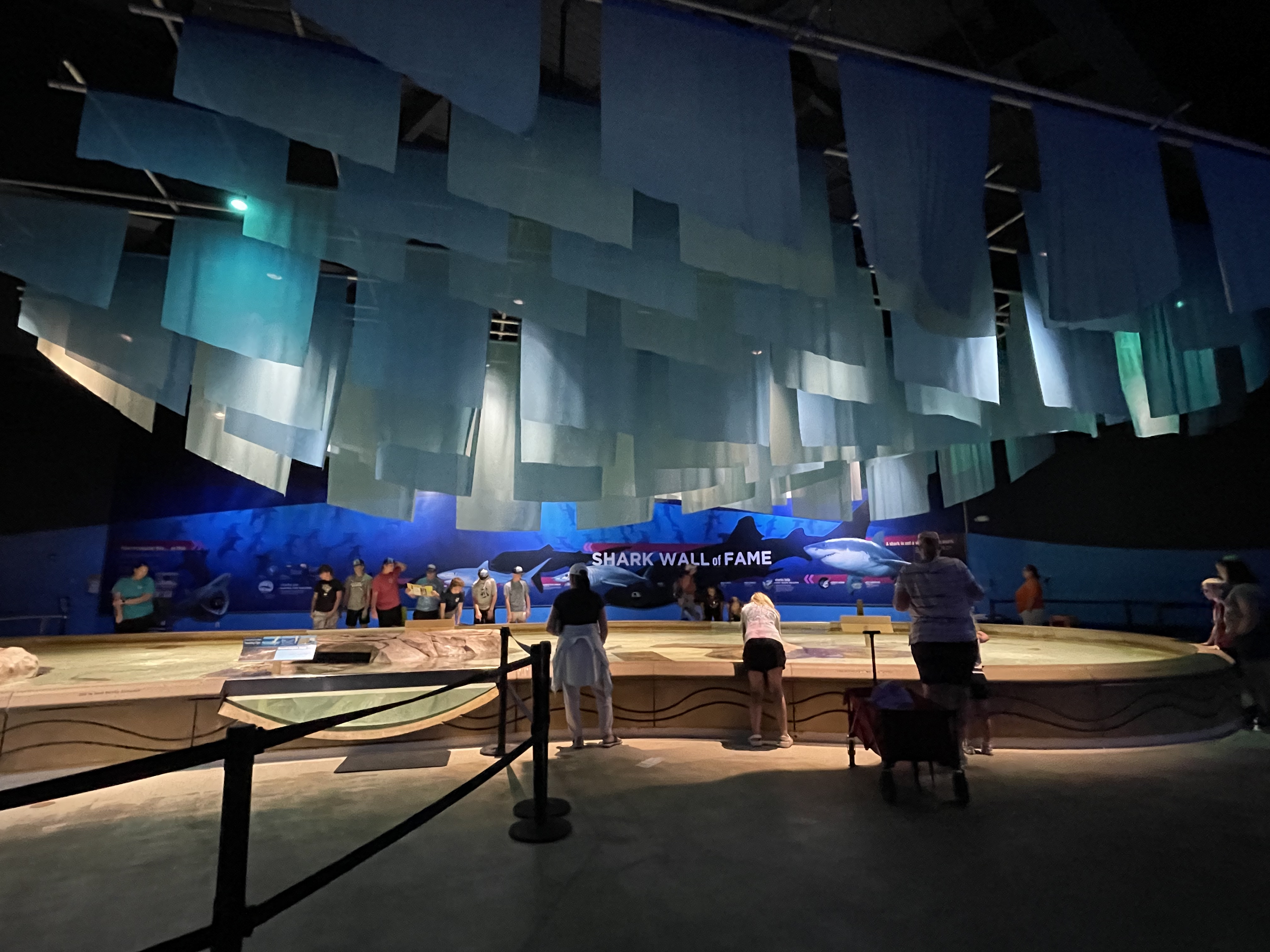
One area of the Oceans biome contains a shark touch tank with other interactive experiences.

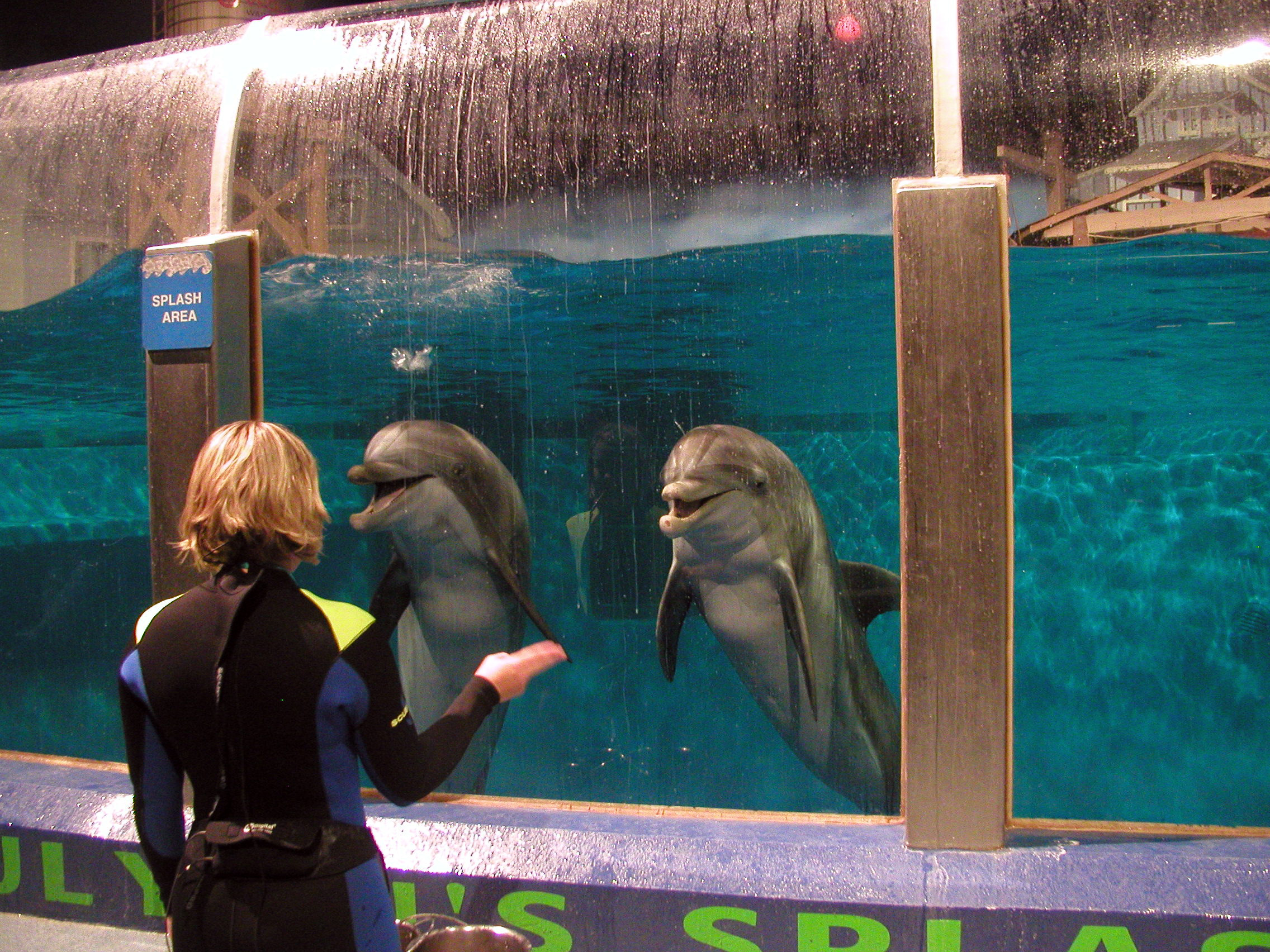
Ripley and China (Atlantic bottlenose dolphins) demonstrating the squawk vocalization during a show

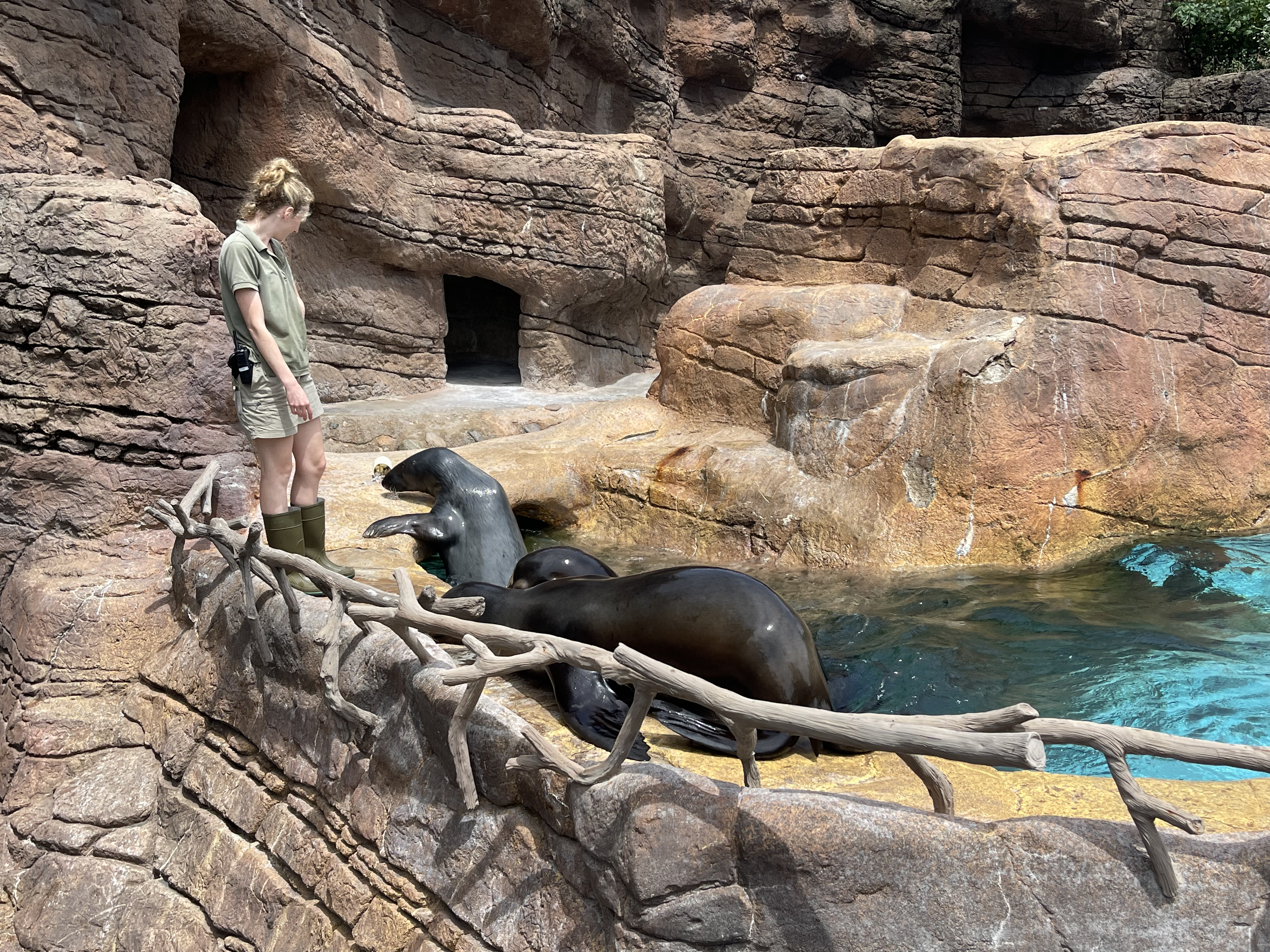
Seals and sea lions exhibit

As of April 2026, the Oceans biome contains the following:

Aquaria

- Arabian angelfish (Pomacanthus asfur)
- Atlantic Spadefish (Chaetodipterus faber)
- Bat sea star (Patiria miniata)
- Bignose unicornfish (Naso vlamingii)
- Bluegirdled angelfish (Pomacanthus navarchus)
- Chocolate chip sea star (Protoreaster nodosus)
- Clonal plumose anemone (Metridium senile)
- Coral
- Coral catshark (Atelomycterus marmoratus)
- Corkscrew tentacle sea anemone (Macrodactyla doorensis)
- Cownose ray (Rhinoptera bonasus)
- Crimson anemone (Cribrinopsis fernaldi)
- Desjardin tang (Zebrasoma desjardinii)
- Dusky smooth-hound (Mustelus canis)
- Epaulette shark (Hemiscyllium ocellatum)
- Flame angelfish (Centropyge loricula)
- Green moray eel (Gymnothorax funebris)
- Green sea urchin (Strongylocentrotus droebachiensis)
- Hepatus tang (Paracanthurus hepatus)
- Lemonpeel angelfish (Centropyge flavissima)
- Lookdown (Selene vomer)
- Orange band surgeonfish (Acanthurus olivaceus)
- Pot-bellied seahorse (Hippocampus abdominalis)‡
- Powderblue surgeonfish (Acanthurus leucosternon)
- Powderbrown tang (Acanthurus japonicus)
- Red lionfish (Pterois volitans)
- Sandbar shark (Carcharhinus plumbeus)
- Shortnosed unicorn tang (Naso brevirostris)
- Slate pencil sea urchin (Eucidaris tribuloides)
- Sleek unicorn tang (Naso hexacanthus)
- Southern stingray (Hypanus americanus)
- Spotted moray eel (Gymnothorax moringa)
- Strawberry anemone (Corynactis californica)
- Twotone tang (Zebrasoma scopas)
- Yellow tang (Zebrasoma flavescens)
- Yellowbanded angelfish (Pomacanthus maculosus)
- Zebra shark (Stegostoma tigrinum)

Ascension St. Vincent Dolphin Pavilion

- Common bottlenose dolphin (Tursiops truncatus)

Penguin Hall

- Gentoo penguin (Pygoscelis papua)‡
- Southern rockhopper penguin (Eudyptes chrysocome)‡

Sea Lion & Seal

- California sea lion (Zalophus californianus)‡
- Gray seal (Halichoerus grypus)

Sharing One World: Long-Tailed Macaques

- Long-tailed macaque (Macaca fascicularis)

Walrus Complex

- Walrus (Odobenus rosmarus)

=== Plains ===
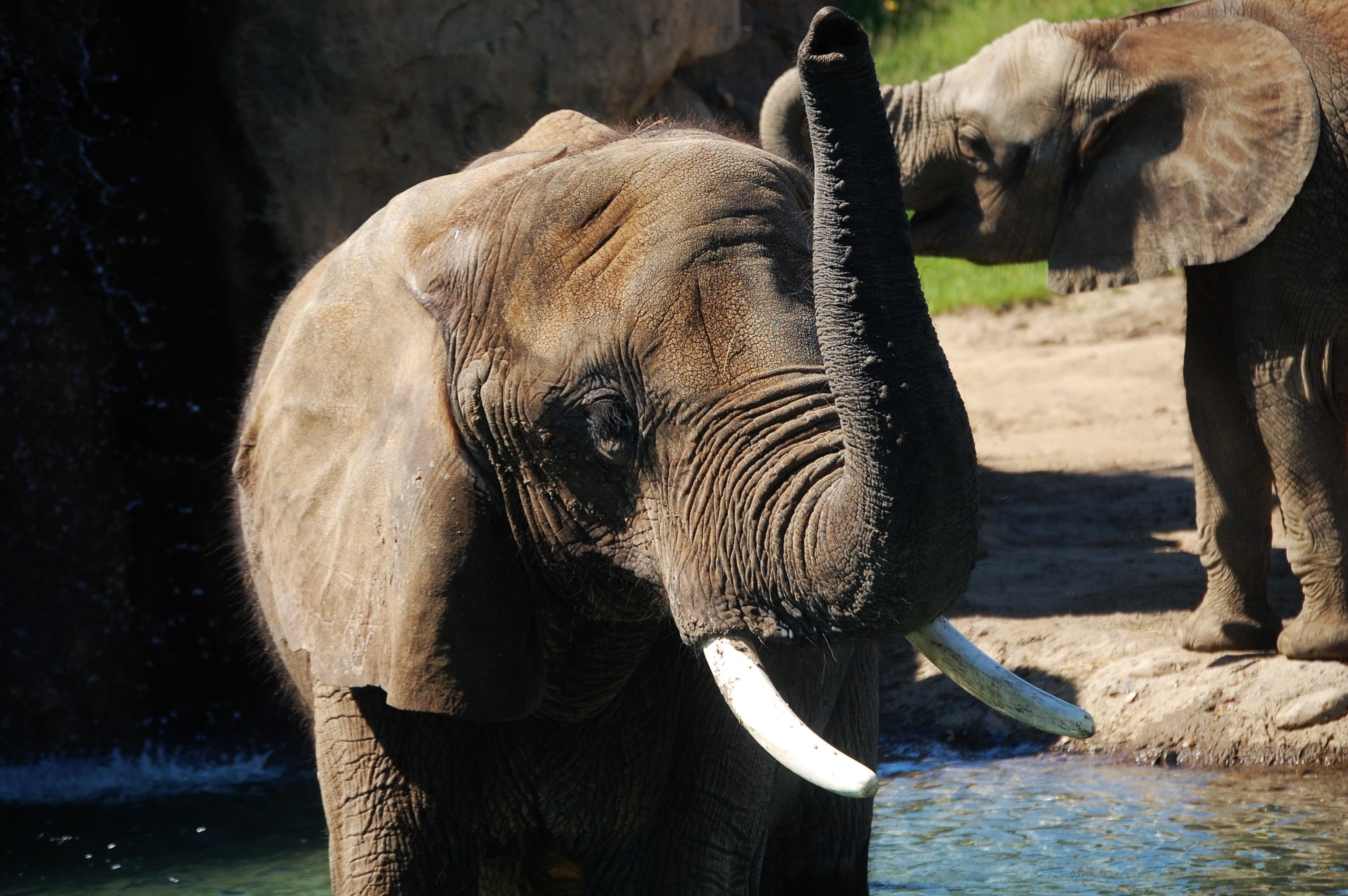
African bush elephants on exhibit in 2009. The zoo was the site of the world's first successful artificial insemination of an African elephant in 2000.

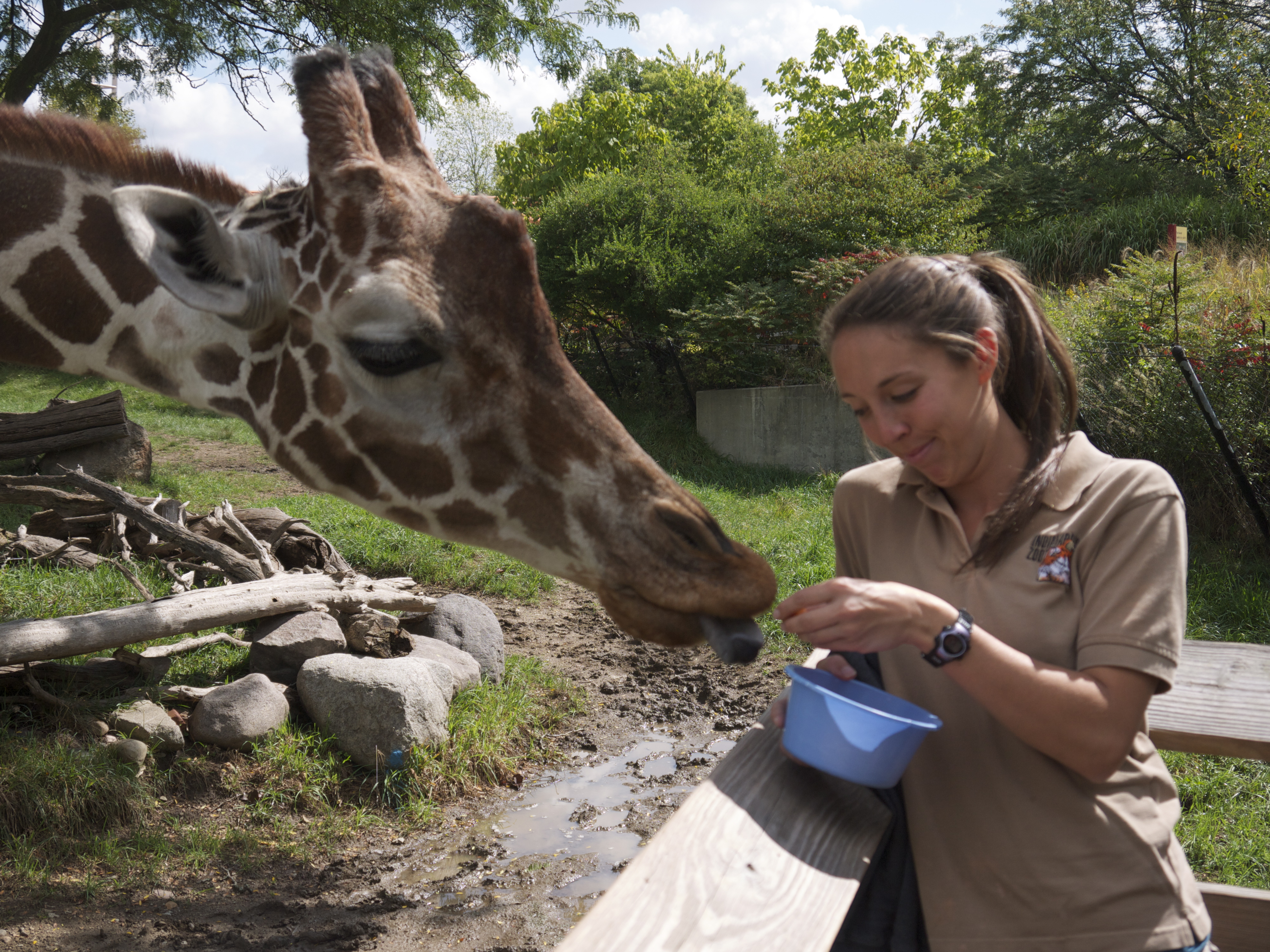
Giraffe being given a treat by a zookeeper

As of April 2026, the Plains biome contains the following:

- Addra gazelle (Nanger dama)‡
- African savanna elephant (Loxodonta africana)‡
- African lion (Panthera leo)‡
- Blue-bellied roller (Coracias cyanogaster)‡
- Cape porcupine (Hystrix africaeaustralis)‡
- Cheetah (Acinonyx jubatus)‡
- Common ostrich (Struthio camelus)
- Common warthog (Phacochoerus africanus)‡
- Eastern yellow-billed hornbill (Tockus flavirostris)
- Grant's zebra (Equus quagga boehmi)‡
- Greater kudu (Tragelaphus strepsiceros)‡
- Grey-crowned crane (Balearica regulorum)‡
- Guinea baboon (Papio papio)
- Helmeted Guinea Fowl (Numida meleagris)
- Reticulated giraffe (Giraffa camelopardalis reticulata)‡
- Rüppell's griffon vulture (Gyps rueppelli)
- Southern white rhinoceros (Ceratotherium simum simum)‡
- White stork (Ciconia ciconia)‡

=== White River Gardens ===
- Hellbender (Cryptobranchus alleganiensis)

== Gallery ==
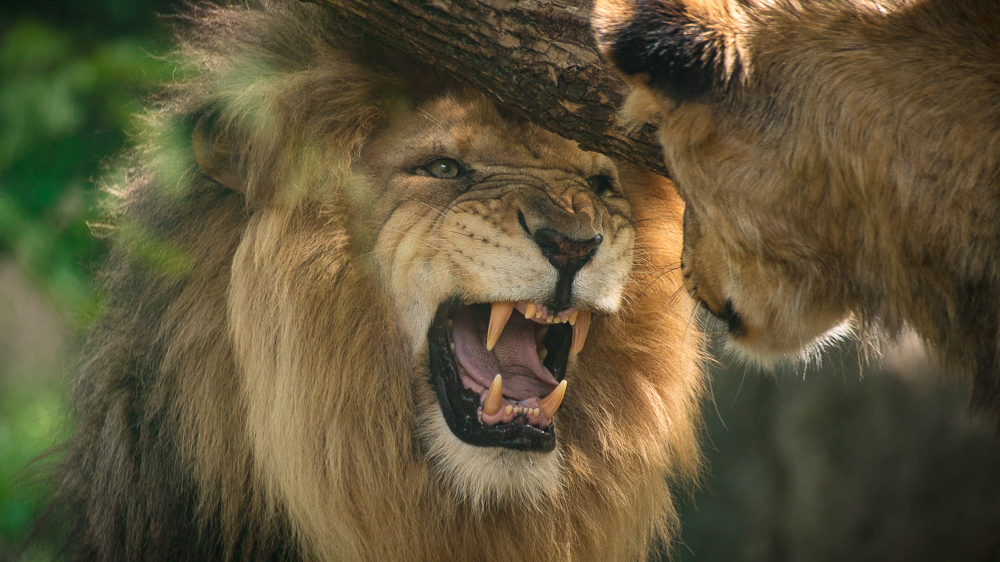
Lion (Panthera leo)

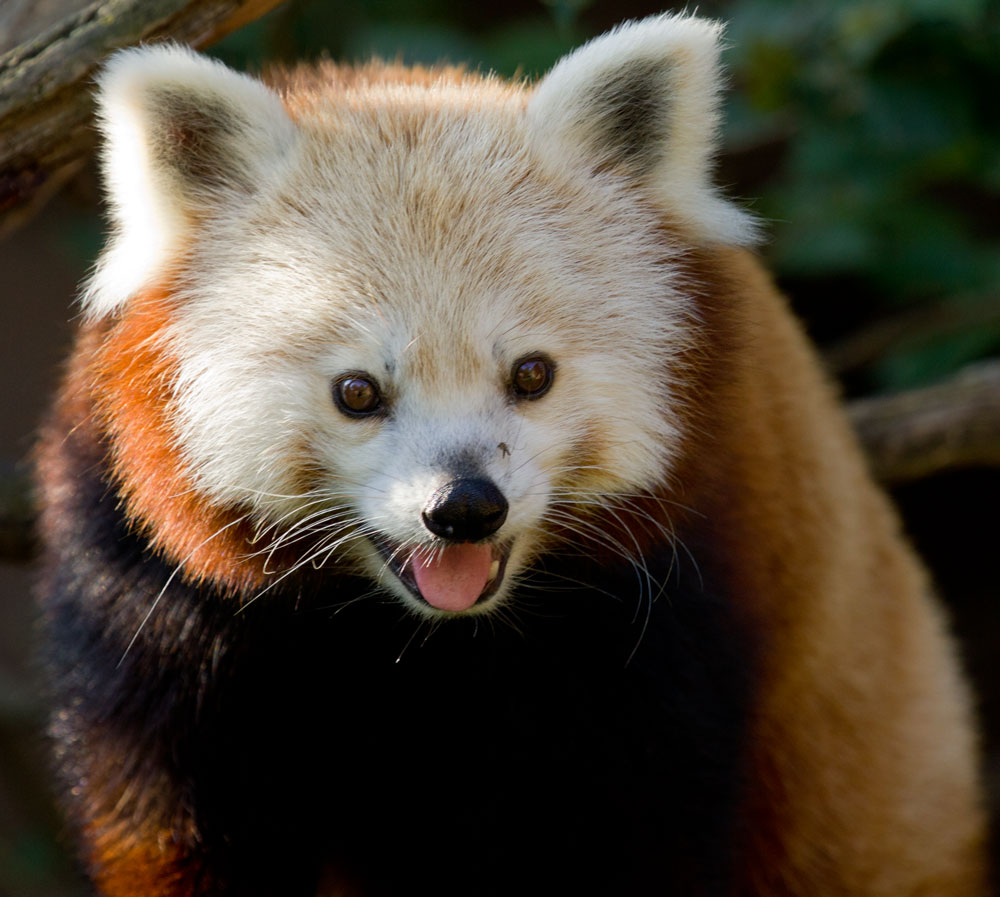
Red panda (Ailurus fulgens)

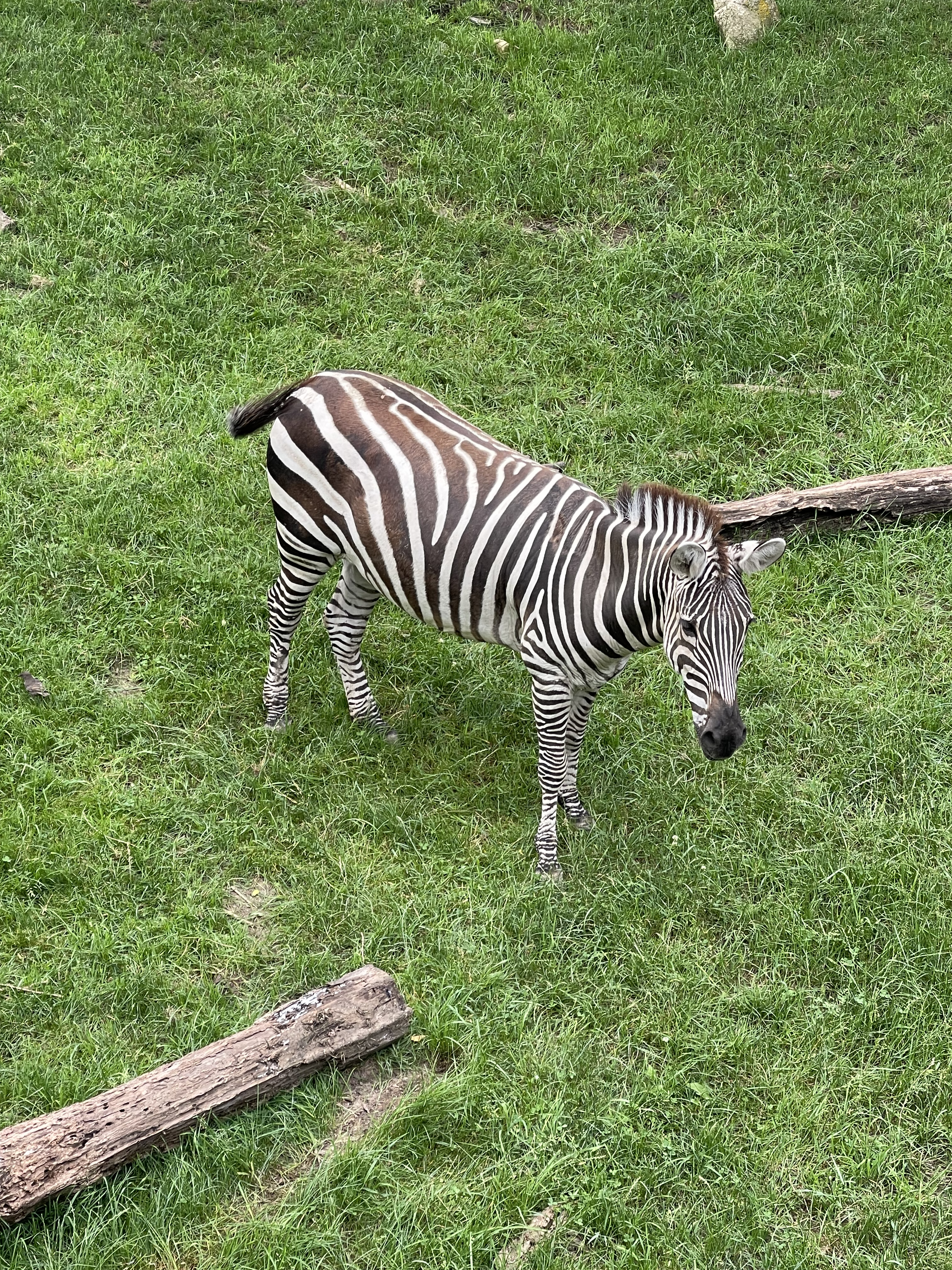
Grant's zebra (Equus quagga boehmi)

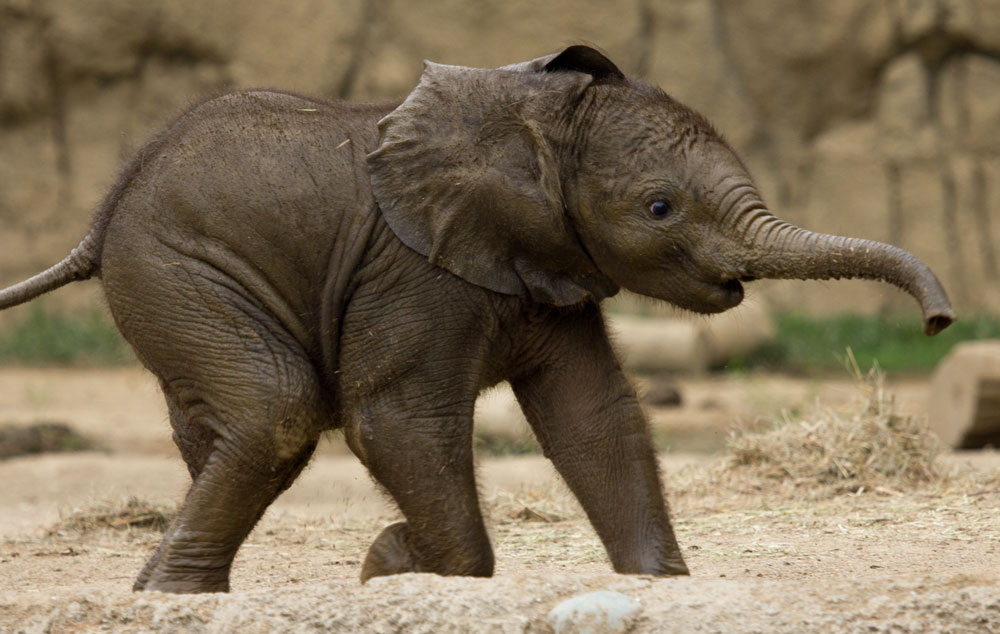
Baby elephant playing at the zoo

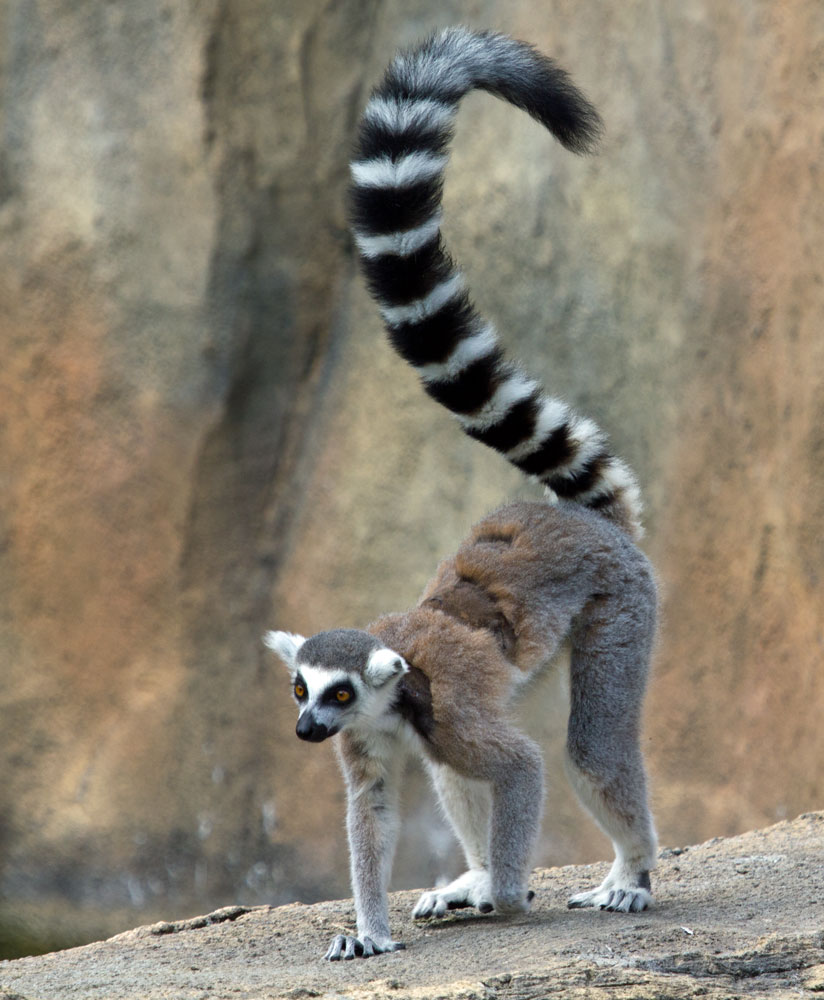
Ring-tailed lemur (Lemur catta)

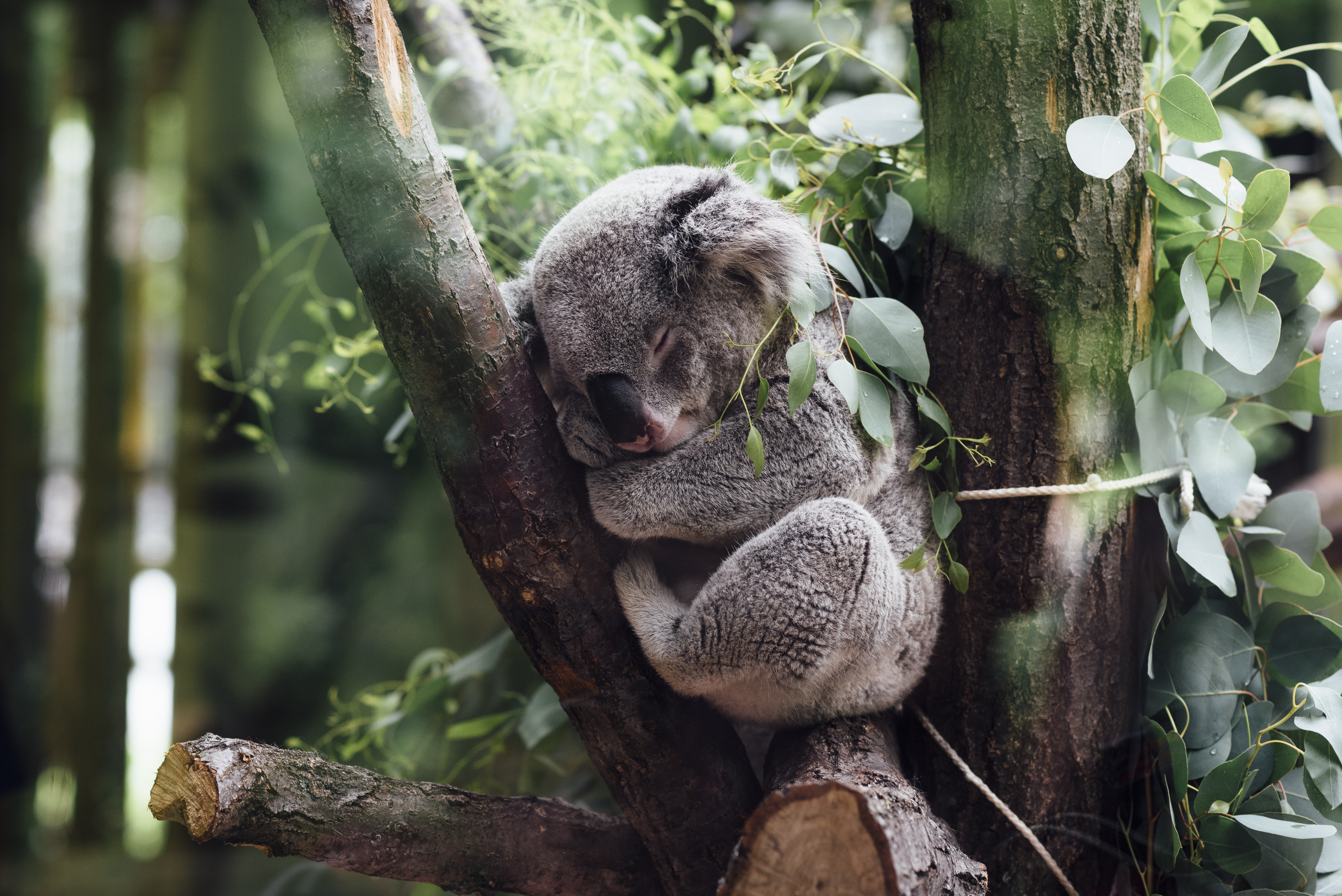
Koala

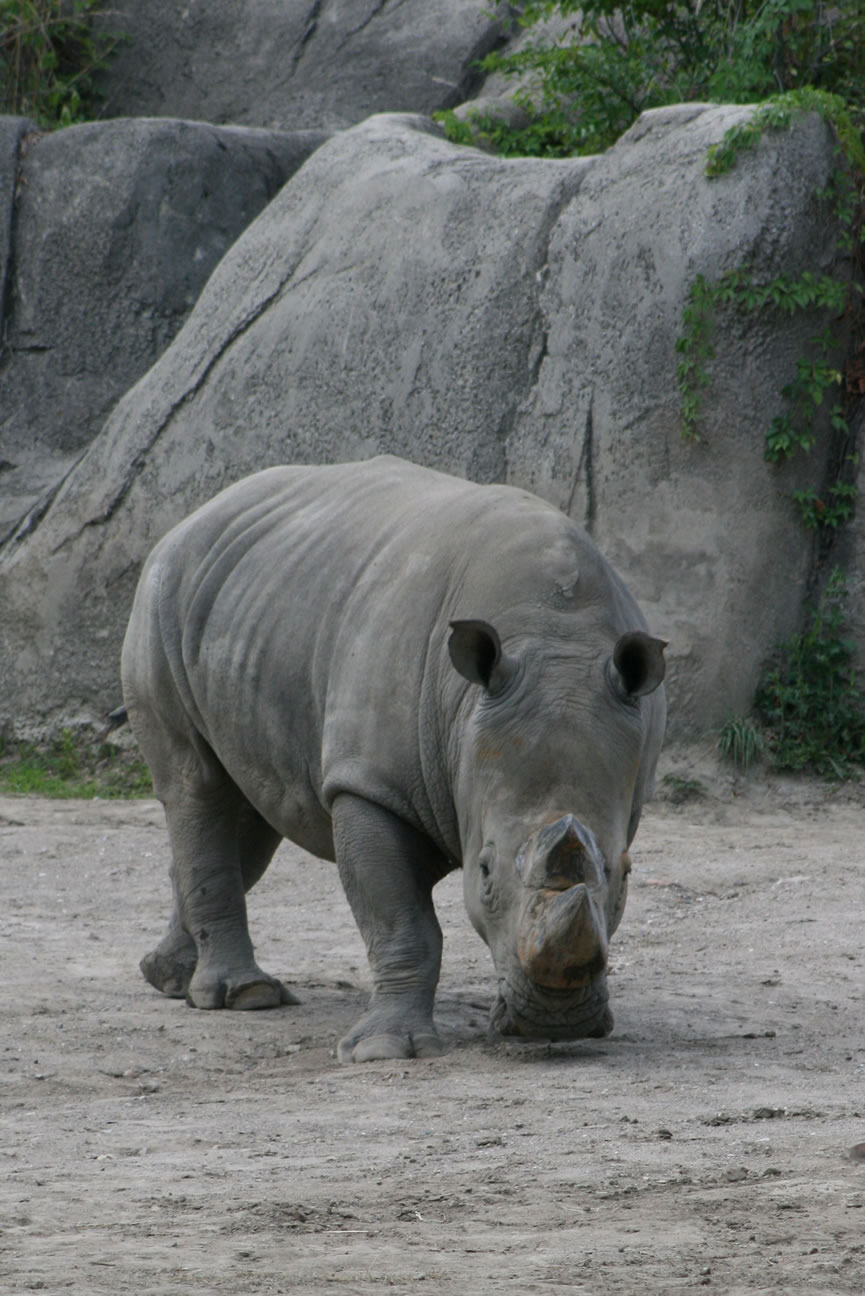
Rhinoceros

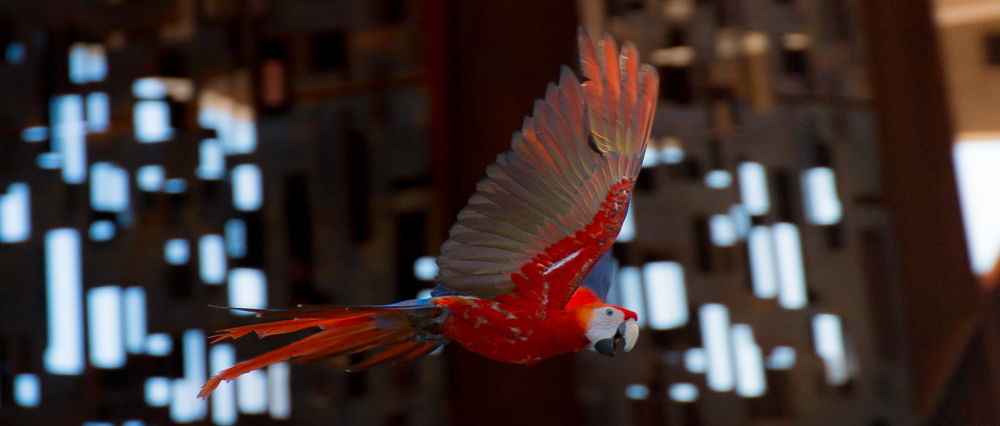
A macaw in flight

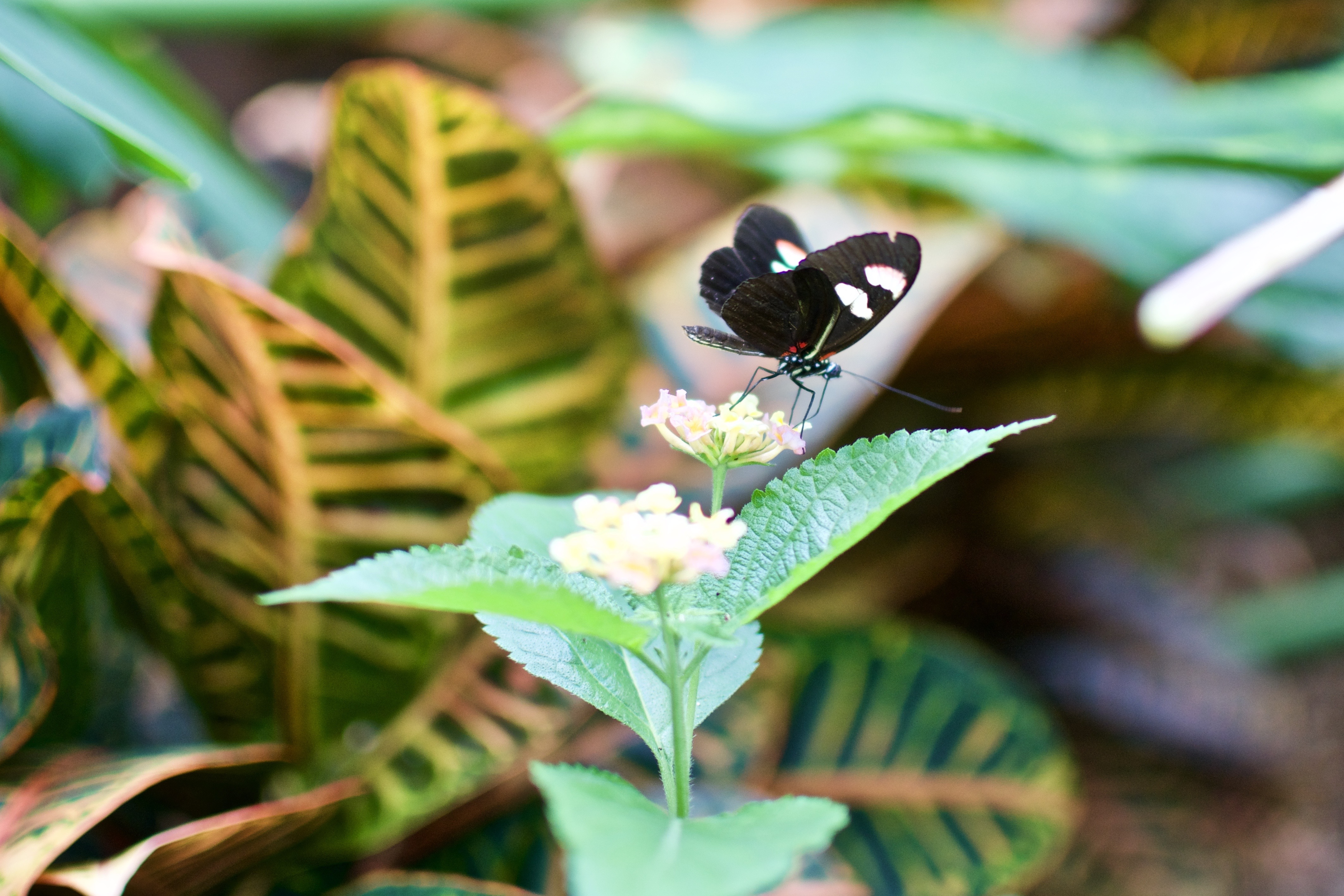
A butterfly on one of the many flowering plants at the zoo

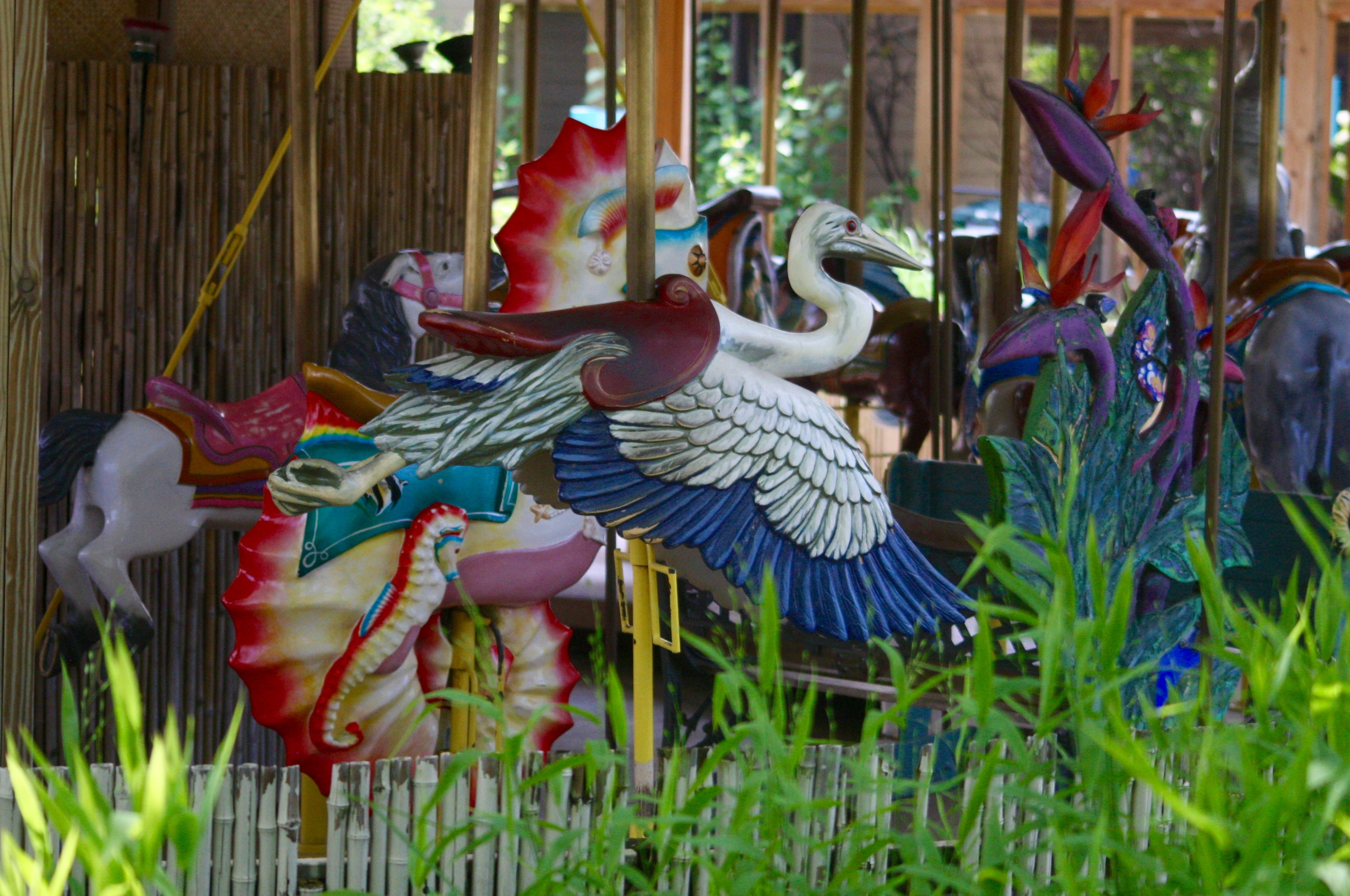
Endangered species carousel

== Other attractions ==
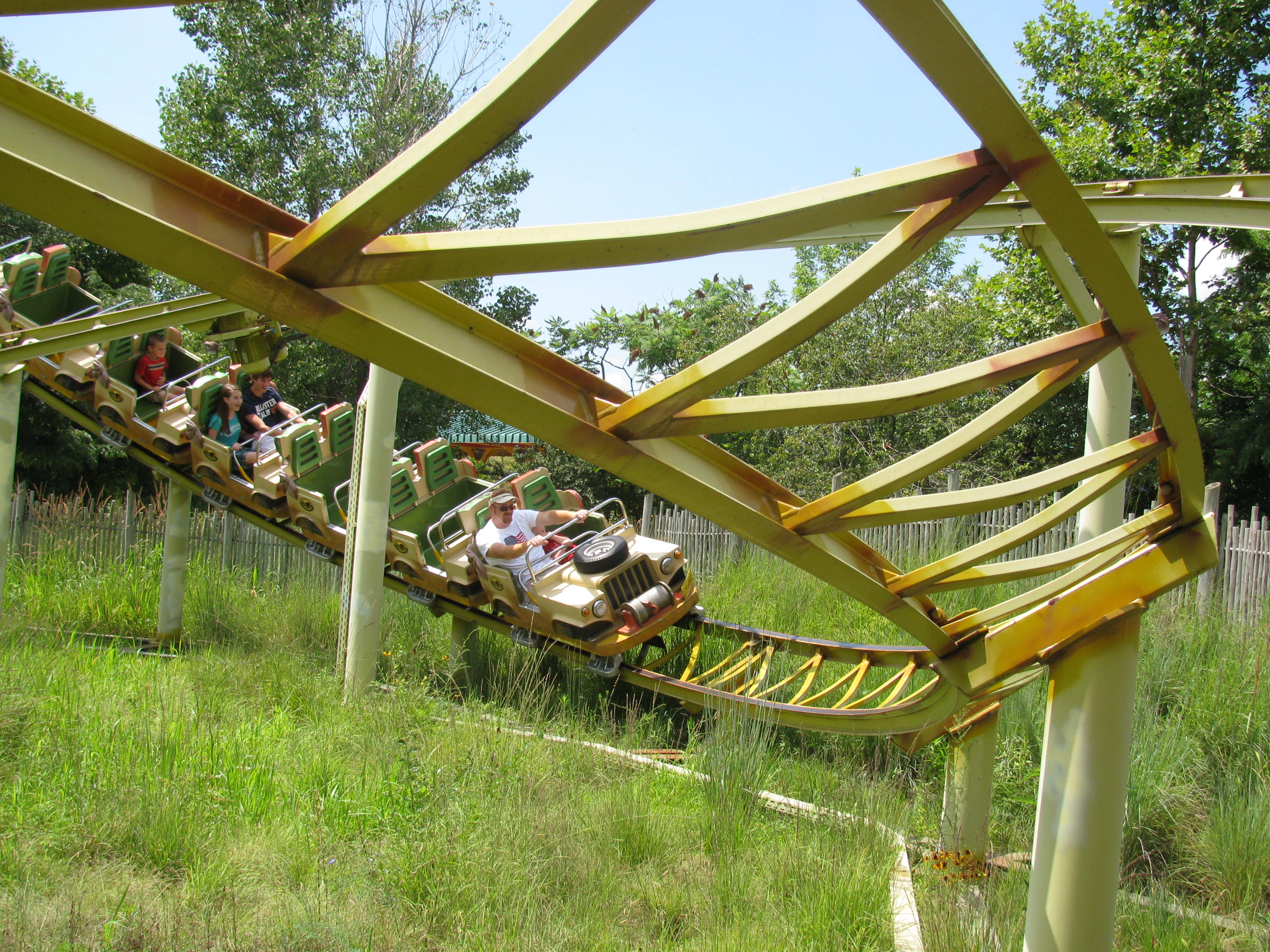
Kōmbo Family Coaster in 2009

The Indianapolis Zoo offers several seasonal amusement rides, animal feedings, rotating exhibits, and presentations for zoo visitors. As of June 2022, general admission costs cover seven "featured attractions" at the zoo, including zookeeper-led presentations highlighting the zoo's dolphins, macaws (Magnificent Macaws), and African elephants (Tembo Camp); Shark/Ray Touch Pool; Kangaroo Crossing; Alligators & Crocodiles: The Fight to Survive; and Race A Cheetah. Tickets purchased at additional cost permit visitors to feed flamingos, budgerigars, lorikeets, or giraffes; and enjoy four rides, including the Endangered Species Carousel (carousel); Kōmbo Family Coaster (roller coaster); Skyline (gondola lift); and the White River Junction Train (train ride).

=== Events ===
Since 1986, Zoobilation has served as the Indianapolis Zoo's annual black tie fundraiser. The outdoor event takes place each June on the zoo grounds, featuring live music and food and beverages from area restaurants. The 2010 event drew about 4,500 attendees and raised more than $1 million to support the zoo's animal care and conservation efforts.

The Indianapolis Zoo hosts popular holiday events throughout the year, notably ZooBoo and Christmas at the Zoo. Held annually each October, the Indianapolis Zoo is decorated in recognition of Halloween; ZooBoo encourages guests to wear costumes for trick-or-treating and special programming. Christmas at the Zoo, held from November through December, is credited as the first holiday lights display at a U.S. zoo, having begun in 1967.

== Conservation and research ==
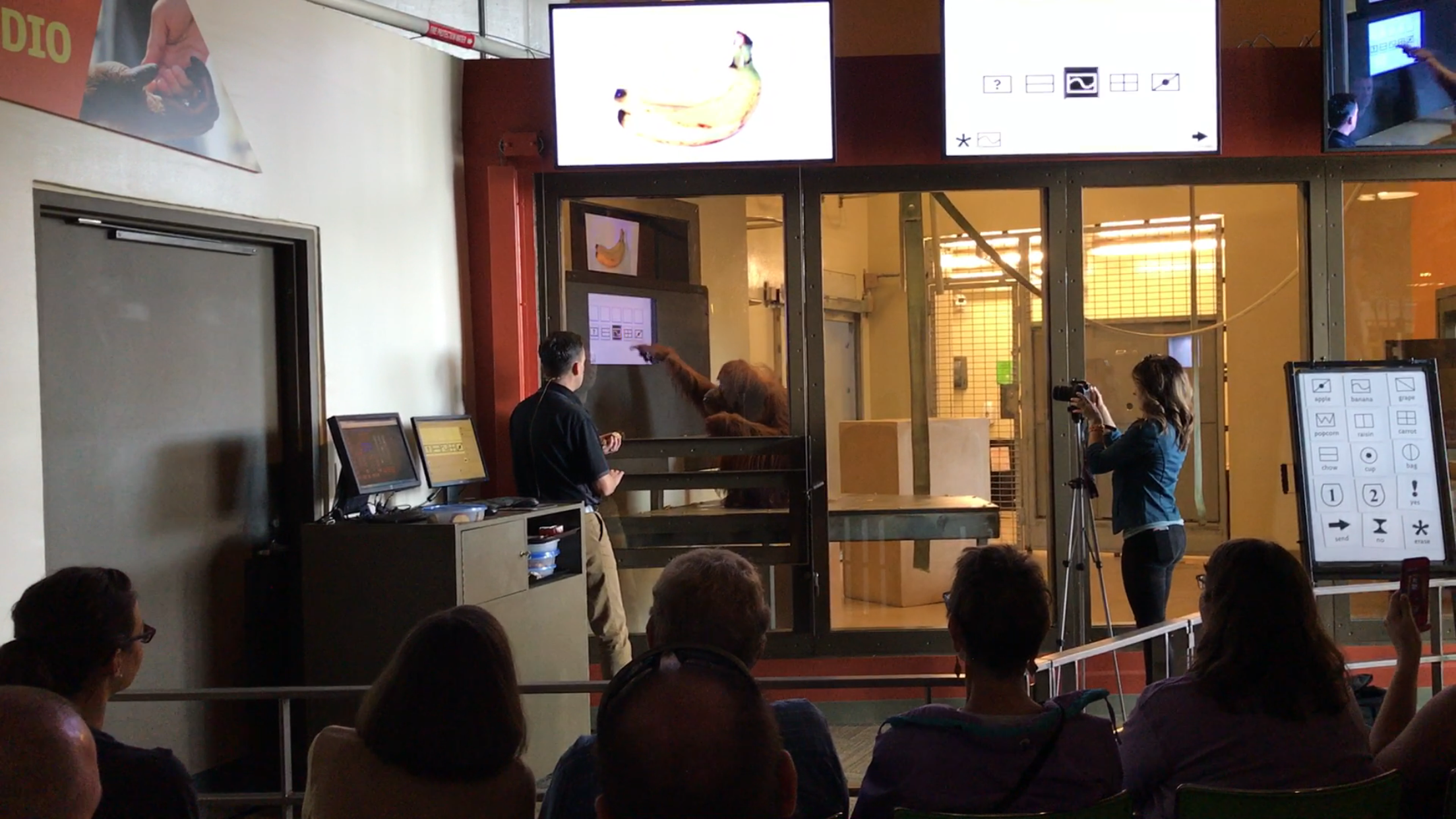
Orangutan research taking place inside the Tim M. Solso Learning Studio at the Simon Skjodt International Orangutan Center

The Indianapolis Zoo has a multifaceted approach in its conservation and research efforts. The zoo participates in the Species Survival Plans (SSPs) and conservation programs of the Association of Zoos and Aquariums, the national zoo membership organization of the U.S. Under the auspices of the Polly H. Hix Institute for Conservation and Research, an initiative that supports the Society's current and future research and conservation programs, the zoo conducts research projects both in situ and ex situ on selected species. The Indianapolis Zoo also participates in three conservation and research foundations: the International Elephant Foundation (IEF), the International Iguana Foundation (IIF), and the International Rhino Foundation (IRF). The Hix Institute also supports the Tarangire Elephant Project in Tanzania to protect migration corridors between Tarangire National Park and the Ngorongoro Conservation Area. The zoo has a second partnership with the IUCN – The World Conservation Union, a conservation network. The Indianapolis Zoo, in partnership with the MacArthur Foundation, is supporting the IUCN's project documenting the known effects of climate change on wildlife habitats.

In March 2019, two female African elephants at the Indianapolis Zoo died from an outbreak of elephant endotheliotropic herpesvirus (EEHV3 strain). Mainly associated with Asian elephants, the EEHV outbreak was a rare instance of the virus infecting elephants of the African species, drawing national interest from researchers. In February 2020, the Indianapolis Zoo hosted a conference convening veterinarians, scientists, and zookeepers from across the U.S. to learn from the case and advance research to benefit conservation efforts.

=== Indianapolis Prize ===
The biennial Indianapolis Prize was established in 2004 to recognize conservationists who have made substantial contributions toward the sustainability of an animal species or group of species. Recipients are awarded the Lilly Medal and US$250,000.

== Notable animals ==
=== Azy ===
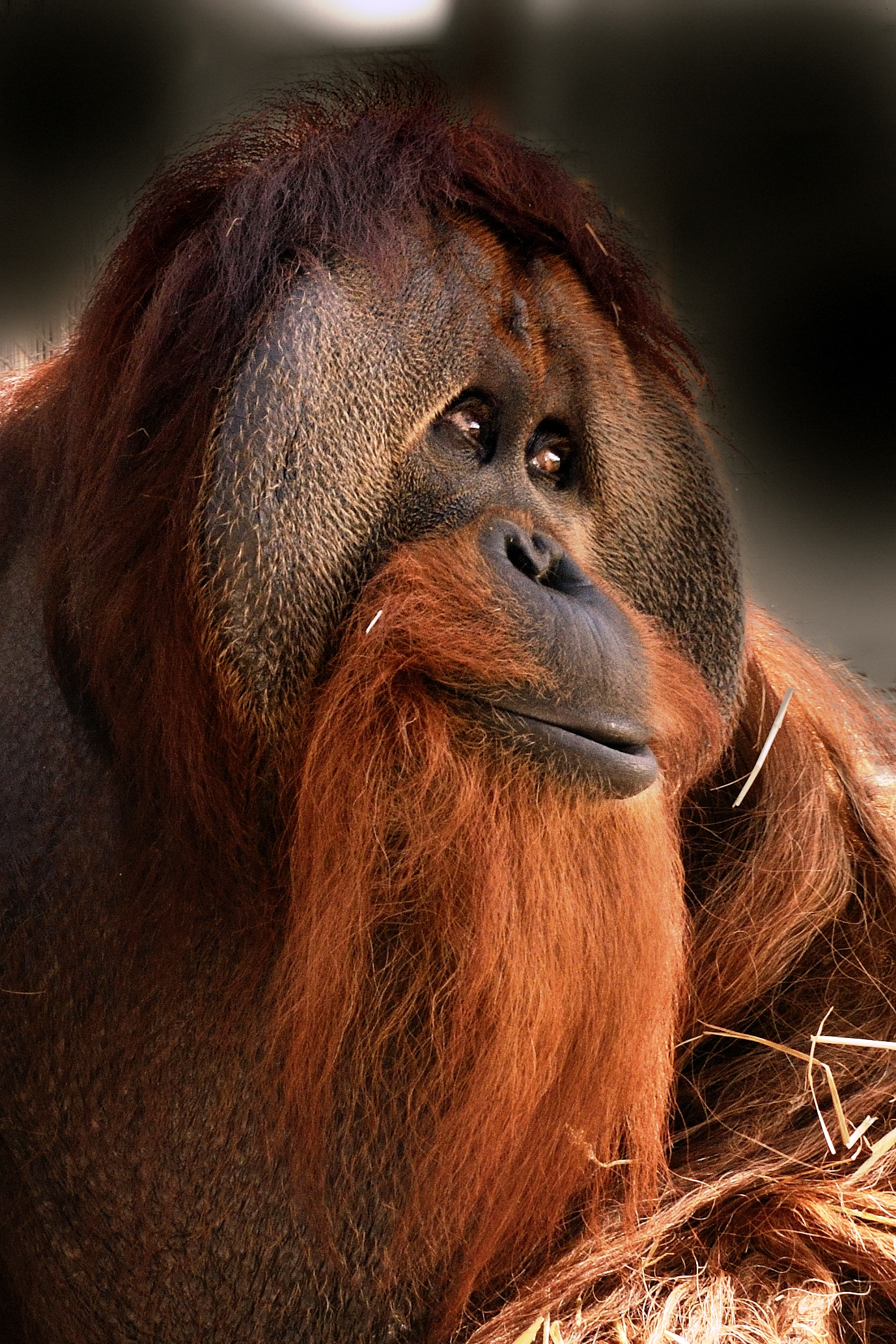
Azy

Azy, a male orangutan, has resided at the Indianapolis Zoo since 2010. Born on December 14, 1977, at the National Zoo in Washington, D.C., Azy was a participant in the Smithsonian Institution's Orangutan Language Project, providing researchers and the public insight into great ape language. Dr. Robert Shumaker, current president and chief executive officer of the Indianapolis Zoo, has worked with Azy in cognitive learning since 1984.

=== Rocky ===
Rocky, a male orangutan, has resided at the Indianapolis Zoo since 2010. Rocky has been noted for his unique vocal demonstrations and ability to "speak". In 2017, Rocky's interactions with a zoo guest were captured in a viral video. The guest had recently suffered a burn and had a large bandage covering a portion of her arm and shoulder. The video captures Rocky expressing interest in the bandage, gesturing to it, and seemingly requesting she remove the bandage. The guest did so, and Rocky is seen inspecting her burn.

=== Tahtsa ===
Tahtsa, a female polar bear, resided at the Indianapolis Zoo from 2006 to 2009. Born at the Denver Zoo on November 20, 1974, Tahtsa lived at the Louisville Zoo from March 1976 to October 2006, before her transfer to Indianapolis. Tahtsa died on August 12, 2009, at the age of 34. At the time of her death, she was the oldest polar bear known to be living in captivity or in the wild.

== Incidents and controversy ==
Since the introduction of common bottlenose dolphins to its collection in 1989, the Indianapolis Zoo has faced criticism from animal welfare advocates, including the Indiana Animal Rights Alliance and the Dolphin Project, founded by activist Ric O'Barry. Concerns about the health of the captive mammals, their use in entertainment, and the results of the zoo's dolphin breeding program have been chief among advocates' complaints. Zoo officials have maintained that the dolphins are cared for in accordance with best practices set forth by the Association of Zoos and Aquariums and serve as "ambassadors for their counterparts in the wild" by educating the public.

On January 11, 1993, a wallaroo named Mookie escaped his enclosure and cleared the zoo's perimeter fence. Mookie roamed downtown Indianapolis for about 20 minutes before being recaptured unharmed by zoo officials.

On November 8, 1998, a zookeeper cleaning a holding area for Cita—one of the zoo's African elephants—was "slammed" repeatedly by the elephant's trunk, knocking the zookeeper unconscious and breaking several ribs. The zookeeper was hospitalized in critical condition and was later upgraded to fair. Another incident involving the zoo's African elephants occurred on July 18, 2003. Ivory struck and injured a trainer upon reacting to a call from her calf, Ajani. A zoo spokesperson said Ivory was "suffering from separation anxiety during training," as Ajani was in another holding area. The trainer underwent surgery to repair an injury to their lower left leg.

On July 17, 2005, a pack of stray dogs breached the zoo's Australian Plains exhibit, killing two black swans, three magpie geese, and three emus. Indianapolis Police Department officers responded to the scene and attempted to corral the dogs, eventually capturing one but fatally shooting four, while a sixth dog escaped. It was not clear how or where the dogs were able to enter the grounds.

On August 9, 2006, a truck carrying a shipment of 24 penguins, an octopus, and several exotic fish from the Indianapolis Zoo overturned near Marshall, Texas, en route to Moody Gardens in Galveston, Texas. Four penguins and several fish died in the crash.

On November 10, 2007, a fire in the zoo's Critter Corner building killed at least three turtles, two birds, an armadillo, and a snake. Following the incident, People for the Ethical Treatment of Animals called on the U.S. Department of Agriculture (USDA) to investigate. An internal inspection the month prior identified no violations, corroborated by the USDA's post-fire inspection. The likely cause of the fire was attributed to combustible bedding that had been moved too close to a heat lamp.

On January 19, 2009, 15 bonnethead sharks in the zoo's Oceans exhibit died after staff failed to reopen a valve regulating ozone while the tank was undergoing routine maintenance. The incident prompted zoo officials to reevaluate staff training, repair procedures, and life-support system design.

Since its debut in 2014, the zoo's Skyline gondola lift has experienced various technical malfunctions that have stranded passengers in midair on a number of occasions. None of the incidents resulted in injuries.

On September 6, 2015, a cheetah named Pounce escaped his enclosure, prompting a one-hour lockdown of the zoo facility. Officials subdued Pounce with a tranquilizer dart before the animal was able to enter a publicly accessible area. No zoo staff or visitors were harmed in the incident. In the months following the incident, fencing was added to the cheetah exhibit as part of the zoo's ongoing investments in enclosure safety.

In October 2025, a spider tortoise and an Egyptian tortoise were stolen from the desert building. Both tortoises were later found in a park in Pendleton, Indiana.

== Public art collection ==
The Indianapolis Zoo's public art collection is composed of several pieces, including American Bison, North American Plains Animals, and Traditional Chinese Lions. Dedicated in 1999, artist Andrew Reid's Midwestern Panorama is a cylindrical mural located inside the Bud Schaefer Rotunda of White River Gardens. Artist Arthur Kraft's Wynkin, Blynkin and Nod are three bronze penguin statues with a silver ball located in the zoo's Oceans building. Originally displayed at Glendale Town Center from October 1960 to July 2016, the sculptures were loaned to the zoo by owner Kite Realty Group. On December 14, 2017, an Indiana limestone sculpture of Azy (by artist David Petlowany) was unveiled near the zoo's entrance in honor of the resident orangutan's 40th birthday.

== See also ==
- List of dolphinariums
- List of zoos in the United States
- List of WAZA member zoos and aquariums
- List of botanical gardens and arboretums in Indiana
- List of attractions and events in Indianapolis
- Washington Park (Indianapolis), the baseball field formerly occupying the current zoo site
