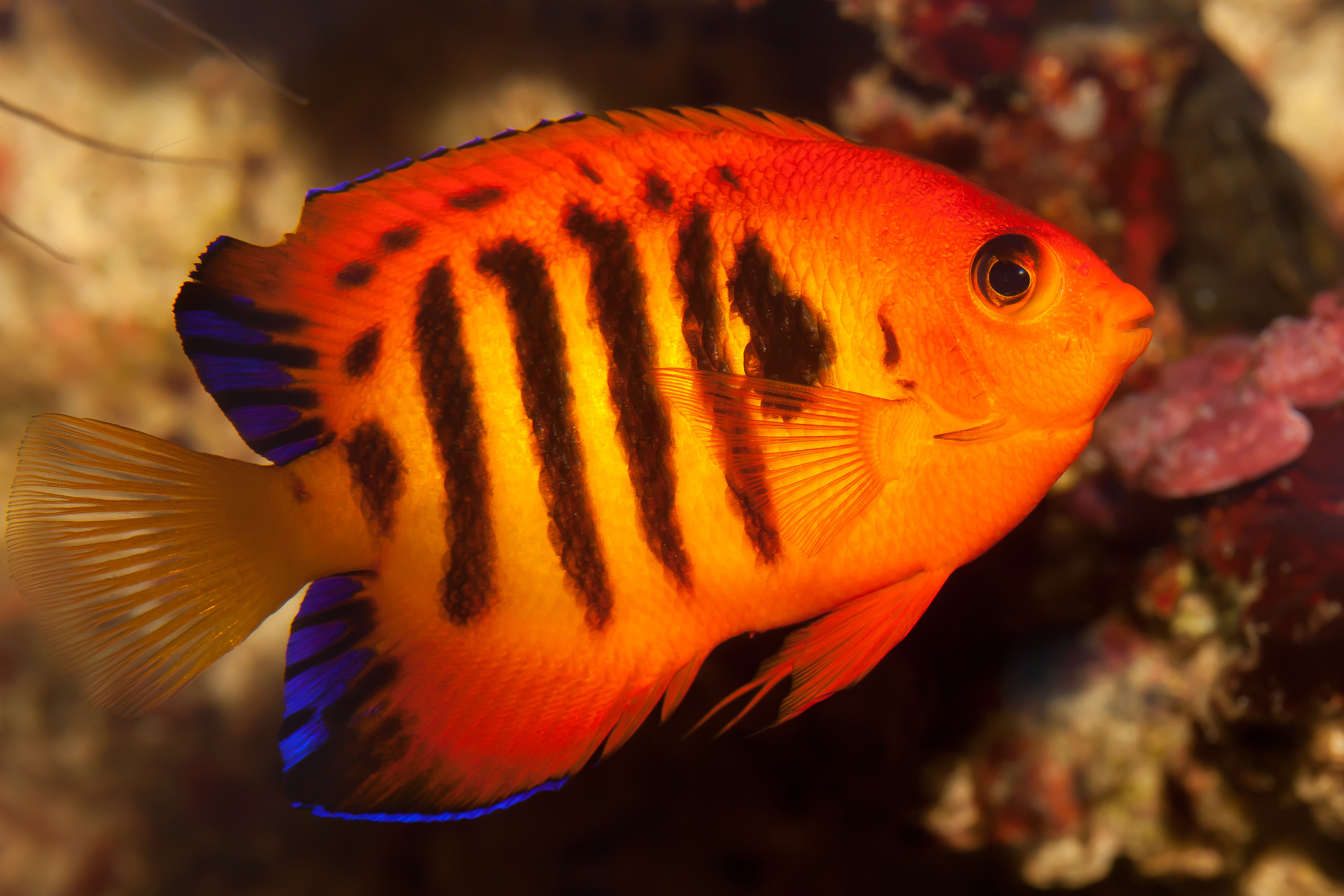

Conservation status
- Least Concern (IUCN 3.1)

Scientific classification
- Kingdom: Animalia
- Phylum: Chordata
- Class: Actinopterygii
- Order: Acanthuriformes
- Family: Pomacanthidae
- Genus: Centropyge
- Species: C. loricula

Binomial name
- Centropyge loricula (Günther, 1874)

Synonyms
- Holacanthus loriculus Günther, 1874; Centropyge loricula (Günther, 1874); Centropyge flammeus (Schultz & Woods, 1953)

= Flame angelfish =

Species of fish

The flame angelfish (Centropyge loricula) is a marine angelfish of the family Pomacanthidae found in tropical waters of the Pacific Ocean. Other common names include flame angel, flaming angelfish and Japanese pygmy angelfish.

== Description ==
The flame angelfish's coloration is bright orange-red with a vertical elongated black spot and four or five bars on the sides, the posterior part of the dorsal, and anal fins, with alternating short purple-blue and black bands. Specimens from the Marquesas lack the vertical black bars. Males are generally larger and slightly more colored than females.

The life span of the flame angelfish is 5–7 years or more.

== Distribution ==
It is found in various reefs of Oceania, most common in Marshall, Line and Cook Islands. The fish is also less commonly found in the Hawaiian Islands. Particularly, the flame angelfish can be found on the foreslope of coral reefs and clear lagoons.

== Diet ==
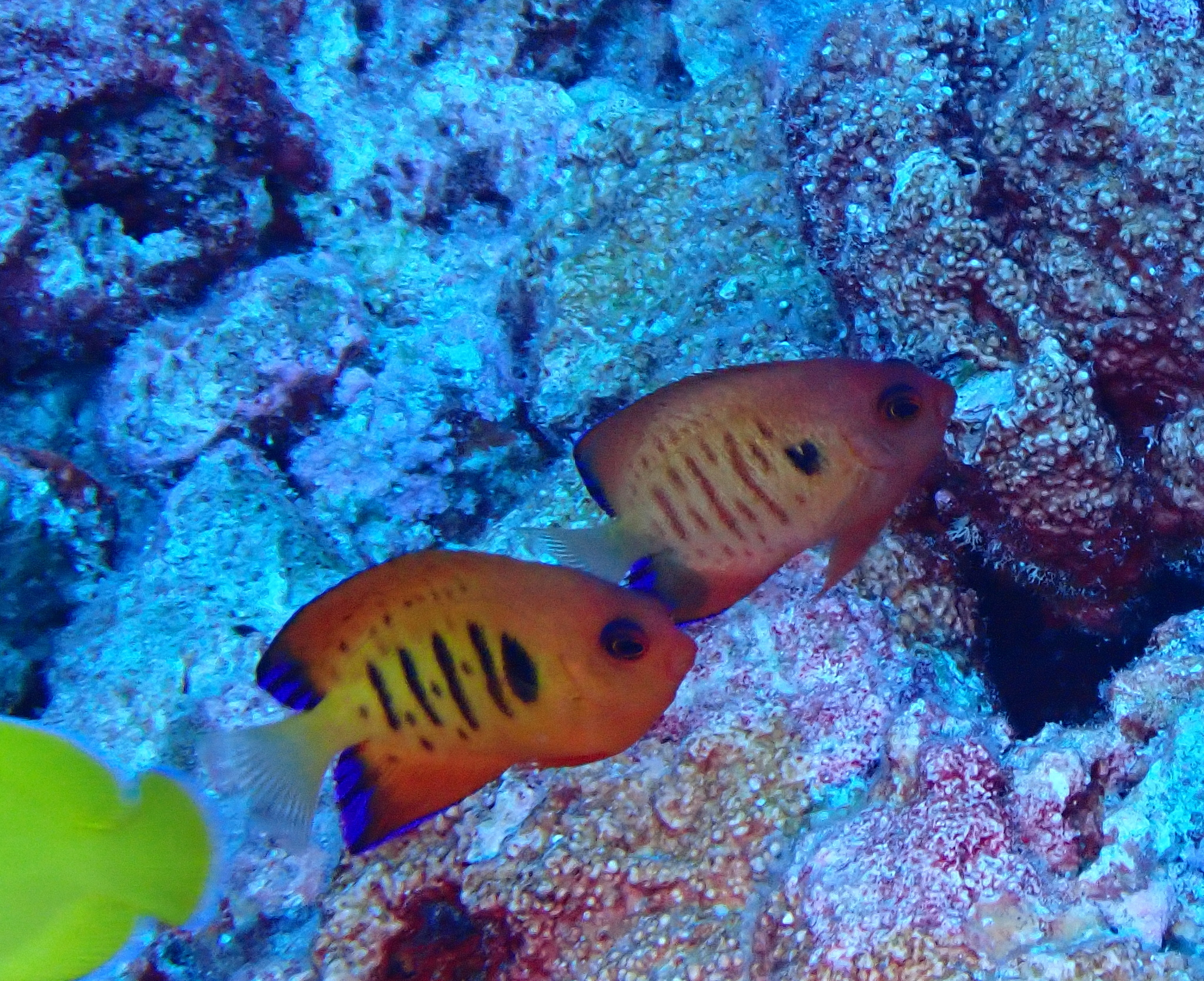
In Tuvalu

In the wild, the flame angelfish has a varied diet consisting of algae and crustaceans. There are occasional specimens that live very long lives in reef aquaria, but the majority of these fish will often die for no apparent reason when they are older. This may be easily explained as many of the Centropyge family are predominantly plankton eaters as juveniles and will switch to consuming its natural adult diet once fully grown. Sometimes, all it takes is for an underfed individual to "test" a food source. This being the case, angelfish are usually added to a well established tank and fed frozen mysis shrimp or meaty crustaceans such as shrimp and clam.

== In aquarium ==
In captivity, this species feeds on a variety of food including brine shrimp, mysis shrimp, and other meat as well as spirulina, seaweed sheets, and pellets, also from personal experience they favor tuna and table shrimp.

The flame angelfish is known to be shy upon introduction to an established aquarium, especially smaller specimens; but, within a week, it will gain confidence and is then constantly seen grazing around live rock during the day.

The flame angelfish is often considered reef safe. They will adapt to a captive diet quickly which will usually prevent them from consuming soft or stony corals. Individual specimens that do pick at coral or clam mantles are more often than not under fed or under nourished.

== Breeding ==
The flame angelfish has been known to spawn in captivity, with successfully captive bred specimens offered by Atoll Farm Aquaculture in Thailand. The flame angelfish is haremic in the wild and can be kept in pairs or trios in an extra-large aquarium. The aquarium should contain only one male—the males have more blue on the outer edge of the dorsal and anal fins, and tend to be larger. The fish will spawn toward the end of the day and release pelagic gametes into the water column. Collecting the eggs and raising the larvae is the biggest challenge. The flame angelfish are broadcast spawners, releasing eggs and sperm simultaneously at dusk. They rise into the water column and release their eggs and sperm at the top.
