= American Bison (Arnold) =

Sculpture in Indianapolis, Indiana

- Artist: William E. Arnold
- Year: 1989
- Type: Barbed Wire
- Dimensions: 180 cm × 66 cm × 220 cm (69 in × 26 in × 86 in)
- Location: Indianapolis, Indiana, United States; 39°46′2.79″N 86°10′34.23″W
- Owner: Indianapolis Zoo

American Bison, is a public sculpture by American wire sculptor William E. Arnold, located in Indianapolis, Indiana within White River State Park. The sculpture is a life-sized male bison constructed of barbed wire, densely coiled and woven. The figure is facing north and stands on a rough limestone block base. It is located on the west end of the Washington Street Bridge at the entrance to the Indianapolis Zoo. It is 5'9" in height, 7'2" in length and 2'2" in width. The barbed wire bison with the limestone pedestal weighs 17 tons.

== Description ==
American Bison is a life-sized bison made of intertwining barbed wire that is painted brown. The bison is standing on a jagged limestone base, as if on a cliff ledge. A bronze label on the front of the base reads: THE AMERICAN BISON / SYMBOL OF INB FINANCIAL CORPORATION / WILLIAM E. ARNOLD / SCULPTOR / INB FINE ARTS COLLECTION / 1989

== Information ==
American Bison was originally created in 1989 and installed outside Indiana National Bank (INB) in the 100 North block of Pennsylvania Street, One Indiana Square, in downtown Indianapolis. The sculpture served as INB Financial Corporation's mascot. In 1993, the bison was relocated to the Indianapolis Zoo after Detroit-based NBD Bancorp acquired Indiana National Bank.

== Condition ==
The condition of American Bison was assessed in 1993 as part of the Indiana Save Outdoor Sculpture initiative to document public art. In 1993 the sculpture was considered to be well maintained. In 2009, the sculpture was still well maintained, with minor rusting of the metal and chipped paint revealing the metallic wire underneath. There is also staining on the base caused by runoff from the barbed wire.

== Artist ==
William E. Arnold is from Wilkinson, IN. He has had a lifelong love of animals and by the age of 14 had taught himself taxidermy from library books. Arnold has a background as a float sculptor for the Indianapolis 500 Festival Parade. In 1983 he began creating wreaths and baskets from grapevines, which he sold at wholesale to local flower shops. He began his work with barbed wire and fence wire when he saw rolls of wire laying in a field at a four-way stop. Arnold said, "I was on the way to pull vines and I saw rolls of wire lying in the pastures and thought it was a buffalo lying in the grass."

In 1989 Arnold made Christmas decorations for the Indianapolis Museum of Art, including a 14-foot grapevine tree and 125 feet of grapevine garland. By 1993 Arnold had opened The Indiana Field Guide Park at his home in Wilkinson, IN. The two acre park included approximately 100 animal sculptures and over one thousand types of plants.

== See also ==
- North American Plains Animals (sculpture)
