= North American Plains Animals (Arnold) =

- Artist: William E. Arnold
- Year: 1988
- Type: Barbed Wire
- Location: Indianapolis, Indiana, United States; 39°46′1″N 86°10′37″W
- Owner: Indianapolis Zoo

North American Plains Animals, is a series of public sculptures by American artist William E. Arnold, located on the grounds of the Indianapolis Zoo in Indianapolis, Indiana, United States. The series of eight animals, all made of barbed wire, are located throughout the grounds of the Indianapolis Zoo. Each sculpture is representative of an animal indigenous to the North American plains, including a bear, bison, whitetail deer, ram, eagle, and caribou.

== Information ==
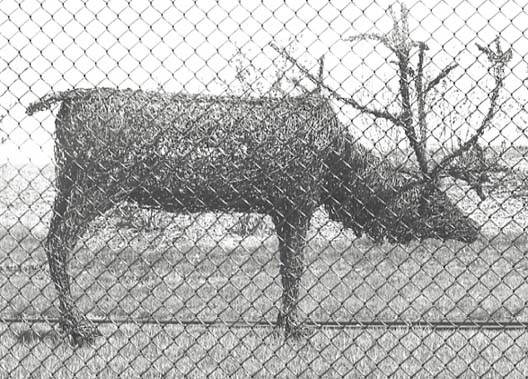
North American Plains Animals by William E. Arnold (ca. 1988)

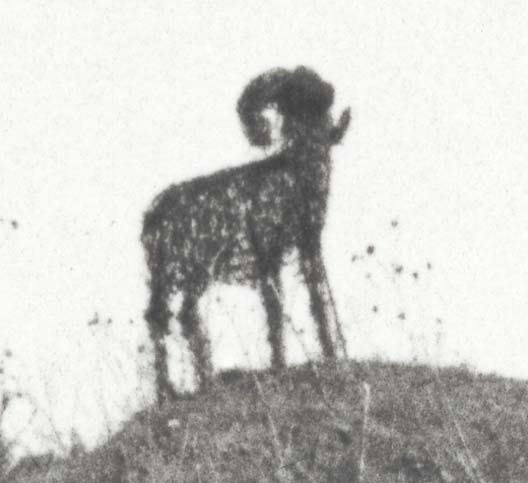
North American Plains Animals by William E. Arnold (ca. 1988)

In past years the animals were oriented toward the Old National Road/US-40, visible to passing traffic. Currently they are scattered throughout the grounds. The bear is located near the entrance to the White River Gardens. A bison is located between the Desert Biome and North Pavilion. The eagle, ram and deer can be viewed while on the Zoo's train ride. The eagle, which has outspread wings and is positioned on a wooden post, is with the deer behind the giraffe exhibit. The caribou are used in a Christmas display on Monument Circle in downtown Indianapolis. All of the animals were created before or during 1988 in preparation for the opening of the Indianapolis Zoo in June 1988.

== See also ==
- American Bison (sculpture)
