= Lowell Nussbaum =

American journalist

Lowell Nussbaum (November 6, 1901 – November 22, 1987) was a professional journalist whose The Things I Hear column ran in The Indianapolis Star newspaper from 1945 to 1971. He was inducted into the Indiana Journalism Hall of Fame in 1975.

== Early life ==
Nussbaum was born in Marion, Indiana. He attended Mann School until his family moved and later attended the Country School outside Fort Wayne. He graduated from Jefferson School in 1919 and enrolled at the University of Michigan.

== Family ==
He was the oldest of three children and son of Josephine Reuss and Percy L. Nussbaum. His father died in 1916.

== Career ==
Nussbaum first worked as a laborer for the Truck Company and at a box company in that same year. Soon after he got involved with the newspaper business and bought and built newspaper routes. He also was promoted as a proof-reader for the paper and it was at that time, Nussbaum realized his desire to become a reporter and later that summer began working for the Chicago Journal. In the summer of 1920, he worked for the Huntington Press as a reporter. In 1921, he worked for the Indianapolis Times and eventually became the paper's aviation editor. He worked for the Indianapolis Times until 1933 and decided to join the Toledo News-Bee as an assistant city editor. He returned to the Indianapolis Times in 1938 as a special assignment reporter and columnist and remained with them until 1945. He then worked for the Indianapolis Star as a columnist and worked here until his retirement in 1971.

== Awards and honors ==
- Casper Award in 1961
- Indianapolis Zoological Society named the zoo's administration building the Lowell Nussbaum Center
- Indiana Journalism Hall of Fame on April 28, 1975

== Organizations ==
- One of the founders of the Indianapolis Press Club
- Fourth president of the Indianapolis Press Club
- Chairman of the Constitution Committee
- President of the Indianapolis Newspaper Guild
- President, vice president, secretary, and Board Member Emeritus of the Indianapolis Zoological Society
