= Evans Woollen III =

American architect (1927–2016)

- Born: August 10, 1927; Indianapolis, Indiana, U.S.
- Died: May 17, 2016 (aged 88)
- Occupation: Architect
- Parent(s): Lydia (Jameson) and Evans Woollen Jr.
- Awards: AIA Indiana's Gold Medal Award
- Buildings: Clowes Memorial Hall; Minton-Capehart Federal Building; Cushwa-Leighton Library; Indiana University's Musical Arts Center; Indianapolis Central Library addition
- Projects: Over-the-Rhine Pilot Center

Evans Woollen III (August 10, 1927 – May 17, 2016) was an American architect who is credited for introducing the Modern and the Brutalist architecture styles to his hometown of Indianapolis, Indiana, United States. Woollen, a fellow of the American Institute of Architects (FAIA) and a graduate of the Yale School of Architecture, was active in the field from the mid-1950s to the early 2000s. He established his own architecture firm in Indianapolis in 1955 that became known as Woollen, Molzan and Partners; it dissolved in 2011. As a pacesetter among architects in the Midwest, Woollen, dubbed the dean of Indiana architects, was noted for his use of bold materials and provocative, modern designs.

Some of Woollen's most iconic projects were built in Indianapolis: Clowes Memorial Hall, the Minton-Capehart Federal Building, John J. Barton Tower, Hilbert Conservatory at White River Gardens, and major additions to the Indianapolis Central Library and The Children's Museum of Indianapolis. Woollen also designed several of the city's notable mid-century modern homes. In addition, Woollen and his firm planned and managed the renovation of several of the city's historic structures, including the Indiana Theatre, the Majestic Building, and Indianapolis Union Station, among others. Major projects outside of Indianapolis included the Over-the-Rhine Pilot Center in Cincinnati, Ohio; Indiana University's Musical Arts Center in Bloomington, Indiana; and the Moody Music Center in Tuscaloosa, Alabama. Woollen was especially known for his churches and college libraries, such as Saint Andrew's Abbey Church in Cleveland, Ohio; the Cushwa-Leighton Library at Saint Mary's College in Notre Dame, Indiana; and the Grainger Engineering Library at the University of Illinois at Urbana-Champaign.

== Early life and education ==
Evans Woollen III was born in Indianapolis, Indiana, on August 10, 1927, to Lydia (Jameson) and Evans Woollen Jr. The Woollen family's ties to Indianapolis date from the 1840s. "Evans" was the maiden name of Woollen III's great-grandmother. Woollen III's father and grandfather, Evans Woollen Jr. and Evans Woollen Sr., were prominent Indianapolis bankers and arts patrons. Woollen was a descendant of Samuel Merrill, a former Indiana state treasurer, and Conrad Baker, a former Indiana governor.

Woollen attended Indianapolis Public Schools and took art classes at the John Herron Art Institute before transferring to The Hotchkiss School, an exclusive preparatory school in Lakeville, Connecticut, during his junior year of high school. Woollen, who later remarked that he had wanted to be an architect since his youth, studied under modern architects Philip Johnson and Louis Kahn at Yale University. In addition, Woollen trained under architects Paul Schweikher and John M. Johansen. Woollen graduated from Yale School of Architecture in 1952, earning a B.A. and an M.Arch. degree.

Woollen apprenticed at Johnson's firm in New Canaan, Connecticut, which was a center for modern architectural design at that time. Johnson was the noted modernist architect of the Glass House in New Canaan. Woollen also worked on his own for two years before establishing his practice in Indianapolis in 1955.

== Marriage and family ==
In 1955, Woollen married Nancy Sewell, a psychotherapist, educator, and arts community leader. The Woollens settled in Indianapolis and moved into the former residence of Indianapolis architect Kurt Vonnegut Sr. on North Illinois Street in 1962. The home was also the boyhood home of Vonnegut's son, the noted author Kurt Vonnegut Jr. The Woollens were the parents of two sons, Malcolm and Ian. Nancy Sewell Woollen died in 1992.

Following Woollen's retirement from his architectural practice in Indianapolis around 2001, he moved to Boulder, Colorado, where he designed his own home.

== Career ==
In 1955, at the age of twenty-seven, Woollen returned to his hometown of Indianapolis to establish his architecture firm, which remained in business for more than fifty-five years. Woollen initially specialized in modern residential designs, but his work soon expanded to include commercial and urban-design projects before he retired in the early 2000s.

=== Early residential commissions ===
Woollen's early commissions were primarily mid-century modern residences in the International style. One of Woollen's first commissions in Indianapolis was an International-style home for the Perlov family. The symmetrical, one-story, U-shaped residence (ca. 1960–63) was featured in House and Garden magazine. When the International style did not prove to be especially popular among Indianapolis homeowners, Woollen turned to other styles, as well as commission work for commercial projects. Another early residential commission illustrates his modern interpretation of an earlier architectural form. The Leibman residence (ca. 1962–64), featured in House Beautiful and House and Garden magazines, was a cluster house of two circular structures with conical roofs that evoked the style of an old European peasant farmhouse in southern Italy.

=== Major commercial projects ===
Between 1962 and 1976, Woollen was commissioned to design some of his best-known works, many of which serve as examples of Modernism and Brutalism architectural styles. Woollen's best known commercial projects were built in Indianapolis. These include Fesler Hall (1962), an addition to the John Herron Art Institute; Clowes Memorial Hall (1963), co-designed with John M. Johansen and located on the campus of Butler University; the John J. Barton Tower (1967), a high-rise apartment building; Saint Thomas Aquinas Church (1968); and the Minton-Capehart Federal Building (1976). These structures are notable for their exposed concrete slabs, which are typical of the Brutalism style.

Fesler Hall, Woollen's first civic commission, was a freestanding wing addition at the John Herron Art Institute. The three-story structure connected via covered walkway to the original Paul Philippe Cret-designed building that was erected in 1928–29. Woollen's addition was noted for its use of reinforced concrete, exposed columns, and deeply coffered ceilings.

The design for the $3.5 million Clowes Memorial Hall was a controversial one, but Allen Whitehill Clowes, the son of George H. A. Clowes for whom the building is named, supported Woollen's proposal. The thirty-one-year-old Woollen teamed with John M. Johansen, a modernist architect with a national reputation who had been Woollen's professor at Yale and a former classmate of Allen Clowes at Harvard University. Woollen served as the junior partner in the project, but he was the "driving force behind its design and detail." Since Clowes Hall opened in 1963, the architectural community has praised its bold design. The success of this major project, which a reporter for The New York Times Magazine called "cool, dignified, and quietly dramatic," led to Woollen securing other significant commissions in Indianapolis.

Another of Woollen's major projects in the 1960s was Barton Tower, the first high-rise apartment building in Indianapolis that provided low-cost housing for senior citizens. Described by some as "ungainly" and "awkward," it received international coverage in architecture journals for its "inventive take on public housing." The estimated $3.5 million project contained 248 apartment units on twenty floors. The tower's fifteenth floor offered an open public space for use of its residents.

Libraries and churches also became a specialty of Woollen and his firm. The Modernist-style Marian University library (1966) in Indianapolis, Indiana, had a square form with an exposed structural frame and open staircase with stacks arranged around reading areas. Two of Woollen's early notable church designs include Saint Thomas Aquinas Church (1968) in Indianapolis and Saint Andrew's Abbey Church (1985–86) in Cleveland, Ohio. Saint Thomas Aquinas Church was the recipient of an Indiana Society of Architects award for its bold, geometric design. Saint Andrew's polygonal plan has a controversial asymmetrical exterior and striking modern sanctuary of exposed steel, concrete walls, and an upward-sloping ceiling.

The Minton-Capehart Federal Building was a $20 million project that some have called a "pigeon coop" and "the ugliest building in Indianapolis." Built to fill in the east side of the Indiana World War Memorial Plaza, the block-long, six-story structure is raised 24 feet (7.3 m) above grade on large columns. The concrete building is known for its distinctive, horizontal façade that tilts outward as the square footage of each upper floor increases. Graphic artist Milton Glaser designed a graphic rainbow mural that wraps the exterior's base. Many local residents disliked the colorful mural, as well as the building's stark design, but architects have considered it one of the city's few "cutting-edge designs from the 1970s."

=== Partnership with Molzan ===
In 1968, Woollen formed a partnership with Lynn Molzan, a Tacoma, Washington, native who joined the firm in 1965. The firm was incorporated as Woollen Associates in 1968. It was renamed Woollen, Molzan and Partners in 1982 and dissolved in 2011, several years after Woollen retired. Woollen, Molzan, and their team designed a wide range of projects, including commercial buildings, churches, governmental buildings, and various college and university buildings, among other projects.

Notable works from the 1970s and 1980s in Indianapolis included an atrium entrance (1989) to The Children's Museum of Indianapolis and the White River Gardens Conservatory (1999) at the Indianapolis Zoo. Outside of Indianapolis, major projects in Indiana included the New Harmony Inn (1975) at New Harmony and Saint Meinrad Archabbey's monastery and library (1984) in Spencer County.

Woollen and his firm designed numerous performing arts structures, libraries, and academic buildings, which became the firm's specialties. Notable examples include several Indianapolis churches: Saint Phillip's Church (1986), Holy Cross Lutheran Church (1990), Saint Monica's Church (1993), and a modern addition (1983–89) to Christ Church Cathedral, a city landmark on Monument Circle. Notable library projects included the Cushwa-Leighton Library (1981–82) at Saint Mary's College in Notre Dame, Indiana, and Indiana University's Musical Arts Center (1972) in Bloomington. The two-story, rectangular-shaped Cushwa-Leighton Library at Saint Mary's College was one of the five winners of the AIA/ALA Library Building Award for 1983. The IU project, another example of Woollen's interpretation of the Brutalist style, includes work and storage spaces arranged around a cylindrical, 1,500-seat opera house.

Despite his many successful projects, Woollen's outspoken nature cost his firm at least one major commission. Woollen expressed his preference for building the new Indianapolis Museum of Art facility amid the historic buildings in downtown Indianapolis, but the decision was made to build the new art museum at its present-day site northwest of the downtown area. Because he opposed its location, Woollen was not commissioned to design any of the art museum's buildings.

While many of his firm's projects were located in Indiana, Woollen and his team also worked on others that were built elsewhere in the United States. Besides Saint Andrew's Abbey Church in Cleveland, these include the Moody Music Center (1983–90) on the University of Alabama campus in Tuscaloosa and the Grainger Engineering Library (1987–95) at the University of Illinois at Urbana–Champaign.

=== Preservation and urban planning projects ===
Woollen was well known for his Modern and Brutalism designs, but he also loved older historical styles and was interested in preserving notable buildings. Woollen and his firm completed several historic preservation projects, including churches, apartment and commercial buildings, and theatres. Notable examples include restoration of the Indiana Theatre (1982), the main shed of Union Station (1986), and the Majestic Building (1984–91) in downtown Indianapolis.

In addition to preservation work in Indianapolis, Woollen was involved in the redevelopment of the Over-the-Rhine historic neighborhood in Cincinnati, Ohio. Woollen designed the Over-the-Rhine Pilot Center (1972–84), which included four mixed-use buildings within a two-block area. The buildings included a recreational center, a senior citizens center, a Montessori school and daycare center, and a meeting and event space. Funding for the $2.5 million project came from the U.S. Department of Housing and Urban Development.

In 2001, Woollen and his firm was commissioned to restore the Indianapolis Public Library's historic Central Library, which was designed by Paul Cret and built in 1917. The planned $100 million project also included a new, six-story curved glass-and-steel structure that connected to the Cret building through an expansive atrium. The project was the firm's largest commission up to that time and the final one before Woollen retired from the firm. Construction problems caused work to be temporarily halted in 2004, followed by the library and the firm filing lawsuits and counter-lawsuits. Woollen and his firm were eventually released from the project, but the work was completed in 2007 using the Woollen Molzan firm's design at a cost of $150 million. The architectural firm's lawsuit with the library was settled in 2006. (Woollen's firm paid the library $580,000, but it denied accusations that the building had design flaws.) In 2009 the library's "structural consultants were exonerated in court, and it is generally accepted that the innocence extended to Woollen, Molzan too."

== Later years ==
Following Woollen's retirement from Woollen Molzan around 2001, he moved to Boulder, Colorado, where he designed his own home in the foothills of the Rocky Mountains. Woollen also resumed a lifelong interest in painting, preferring to paint landscapes in a geometric, abstract style. He also spent some of his later years in Philadelphia, Pennsylvania.

Woollen continued working on architectural projects into his mid-eighties. Among his final projects were a trio of Modernist homes in Hamilton County, Indiana.

== Death and legacy ==
Woollen died on May 17, 2016, at the age of eighty-eight.

Woollen's innovative designs made him a pacesetter among architects in the Midwest. Steve Mannheimer, a former reporter for the Indianapolis Star, described Woollen as "the most distinguished designer among his generation of Indiana-based architects." Woollen, who is credited for introducing the Modernist and the Brutalist architecture styles to Indianapolis, became known for his use of bold materials and creative solutions to design issues. Woollen was not afraid of being provocative. He once remarked, "If an architect isn't controversial, he can't be very effective." Woollen was also described as outspoken and sometimes stubborn, even when faced with harsh criticism from those who viewed his designs as too modern.

In an active career that spanned from the mid-1950s to the early 2000s, Woollen is noted for his innovative and sophisticated designs that blended with the structure's setting and its history. Some of his most distinctive modern buildings still stand in Indianapolis, including Clowes Memorial Hall, Barton Tower, the Minton-Capehart Federal Building, the west entrance addition to The Children's Museum of Indianapolis, the White River Gardens Conservatory, and a modern addition to the Indianapolis Central Library, all of which are still in use. Woollen is also known for his churches, including Saint Meinrad Archabbey's monastery and library (Spencer County, Indiana), Saint Andrew's Abbey Church (Cleveland, Ohio), and others, as well as numerous libraries. In addition to commercial projects, Woollen designed some of Indianapolis's notable mid-century modern homes.

Although some of his modern building designs were criticized, such as the Minton-Capehart Federal Building and Barton Tower, most of his designs were praised, especially Clowes Memorial Hall, which he co-designed with John M. Johansen. Clowes Hall is one of Woollen's most iconic projects. Woollen and his firm were also involved in projects outside of Indianapolis, including, among others, the New Harmony Inn (Posey County, Indiana) and Indiana University's Musical Arts Center (Monroe County, Indiana) that are still in use. Woollen's firm also managed the renovation and preservation of several of Indianapolis's historic structures, most notably the Indiana Theatre (home of the Indiana Repertory Theatre), Union Station, the Majestic Building, and several historic apartment buildings. Woollen also designed Cincinnati's Over-the-Rhine Pilot Center. These major works, among others, serve as a testament to his "adventurous sense of architectural form" and "respect for its visual and community context."

== Honors and tributes ==
- Woollen, a Fellow of the American Institute of Architects (FAIA), was dubbed the dean of Indiana architects.
- Woollen was the subject of "Building for Meaning: The Architecture of Evans Woollen" (1994), an hour-long documentary film by Terry Black, produced by Spellbound Productions in cooperation with WFYI (TV).
- In 2010 Woollen's work was featured in a retrospective exhibit at the Indianapolis Museum of Art, the same week that Indiana Landmarks sponsored a tour of six area homes that he designed.
- In 2014 Woollen was honored with a reception at Clowes Memorial Hall in Indianapolis.
- In 2015 Woollen was posthumously awarded the AIA Indiana's Gold Medal Award for contributions to the field of architecture, the state organization's highest honor awarded to an individual.

== Selected notable projects ==
- Perlov residence (ca. 1960–63), Indianapolis
- Leibman residence (ca. 1962–64), Indianapolis
- Fesler Hall (1962), Indianapolis
- Marian University Library (1966), Indianapolis
- Clowes Memorial Hall (1963), Indianapolis
- John J. Barton Tower (1967), Indianapolis
- Saint Thomas Aquinas Church (1968), Indianapolis
- Indiana University's Musical Arts Center (1972), Bloomington
- Over-the-Rhine Pilot Center, (1972–84), Cincinnati, Ohio
- New Harmony Inn (1975), New Harmony, Indiana
- Minton-Capehart Federal Building (1976), Indianapolis
- Cushwa-Leighton Library (1981–82) at Saint Mary's College, Notre Dame, Indiana
- Indiana Theatre restoration (1982), Indianapolis
- Christ Church Cathedral addition (1983–89), Indianapolis
- Moody Music Center (1983–90), University of Alabama, Tuscaloosa
- Saint Meinrad Archabbey's monastery and library renovation (1984), Spencer County, Indiana
- Majestic Building restoration (1984–91), Indianapolis
- Saint Andrew's Abbey Church (1985–86), Cleveland, Ohio
- Saint Phillip's Episcopal Church (1986), Indianapolis
- Indianapolis Union Station main shed restoration (1986)
- The Children's Museum of Indianapolis, west entrance and atrium addition (1989)
- Grainger Engineering Library (1987–95), University of Illinois, Urbana-Champaign
- Holy Cross Lutheran Church (1990), Indianapolis
- Saint Monica's Church (1993), Indianapolis
- St. Timothy's Episcopal Church (1968), Indianapolis
- White River Gardens Conservatory (1999), Indianapolis
- Indianapolis Public Library, Central Library addition (2007)
