= Untitled (Hoosier mural) =

Mural by Peter Mayer in Indianapolis, Indiana

- Year: 1972
- Type: Mural
- Dimensions: 23 m (75 ft)
- Location: Indianapolis, Indiana, United States

Untitled was an outdoor mural created in 1972 by architect Peter Mayer located at 430 Massachusetts Avenue in downtown Indianapolis, Indiana. The mural, which featured a large ear of corn with the word "HOOSIER" spelled out in the center in yellow on a white background, occupied the southern wall of the six-story apartment building. The mural was part of the renovation of the apartment complex, which opened on 11 December 1972.

== Description ==
The mural measured approximately 75 feet wide and was painted in a matter of a week in August 1972. Mayer wanted to not only brand the new building as "The Hoosier," but was employing the white paint on the wall in an effort to reflect light into the interior of the rooms. The mural was designed to help re-brand the Davian building into the "Hoosier Apartments." a project that was completed by Woollen Associates in 1972. The "Hoosier Apartments" were designed to be apartments for Indianapolis elderly citizens.

The mural was a feature element for the redesigned apartment building, which included a new urban park.

== Historical information ==
This mural was the first example in the city of "super graphics," which was becoming a way to refresh the visual appearance of buildings in urban settings. Woollen Associates was so in favor of the design that the firm itself paid for part of the painting.

This mural, along with Roland Hobart's 1973 Untitled, Milton Glaser's 1974 Color Fuses which surrounds the Minton-Capehart Federal Building, and James Mcquiston's 1975 The Runners in downtown Indianapolis were hailed in August 1975 as adding a "delightful touch of color and imaginativeness to urban settings."

The mural was removed in the 1980s leaving practically no trace of its existence.

== Artist ==
Peter Mayer graduated with a master's degree from the Yale School of Architecture and] was at the time of the mural's creation, working for the Indianapolis-based firm Woollen Associates. He also designed the covers of the short-lived magazine, Indy Downtowner. He left Indianapolis in the 1970s to begin his own practice in Chicago.

== See also ==
- Untitled (Urban Wall)
- Color Fuses
- The Runners (Urban Wall)
