= The Runners (mural) =

Mural by James McQuiston in Indianapolis, Indiana

- Artist: James W. McQuiston
- Year: 1975
- Type: Mural
- Location: Indianapolis, Indiana, United States; 39°45′59.8″N 86°9′27.1″W
- Owner: City of Indianapolis

The Runners was an outdoor mural by architect James McQuiston located on the east side of the annex to the Barnes and Thornburg Building (originally the downtown Indianapolis Woolworth's location) at 7 E. Washington Street in downtown Indianapolis, Indiana. The mural occupied the east wall of this five-story commercial building. The mural was the result of a 1975 contest sponsored by the Urban Walls Task force of the Greater Indianapolis Progress Committee and the Indianapolis Department of Parks and Recreation.

== Description ==
The mural, which was created using acrylic paint, depicts children at play on a hill as seen through a series of white arched doorways or windows. A fire in 1975 destroyed a building that was adjacent to the mural site; according to the label near the bottom of the mural, "The three-tiered design of the mural was inspired by the architectural structure of the building that burned, and is a whimsical study of color and motion."

The mural occupied approximately 16,000 square feet (1,500 m^{2}) of vertical wall space on the eastern side of what was then the Merchants National Bank Annex. The project took about one month to complete and was dedicated on November 20, 1975, in a ceremony led by Mayor Richard G. Lugar and Otto N. Frenzel III, the chairman of the board of Merchants National Bank. Painting of the mural was accomplished by Naegele Outdoor Advertising under the supervision of the artist.

== Historical information ==
This mural, along with Roland Hobart's 1973 Untitled mural, and Milton Glaser's 1974 Color Fuses mural which surrounds the Minton-Capehart Federal Building in downtown Indianapolis were hailed in August 1975 as adding a "delightful touch of color and imaginativeness to urban settings". A plaque placed at the Washington Street corner tells the story of the mural.

In 1997, the mural was under threat to be painted over by the artist Robert Wyland, who wanted to paint his 74th Whailing Wall, Orca Passage, over the top of The Runners. Indianapolis writer Steve Mannheimer called Wyland's efforts to paint over McQuiston's mural a "leviathan injustice", and quickly garnered significant public opinion to force Wyland to choose a different location. McQuiston's mural remained in place mainly because, as McQuiston stated, many supporters "stepped forward with so many calls and letters to the mayor". Wyland's mural was painted at 120 West Walnut Street and finished in September 1997.

== Artist ==
James W. McQuiston is an architect who was at the time of the mural's creation was working for the Indianapolis-based firm of Woollen Associates. He was 26 years old when he won the competition and now works as an architect in Indianapolis.

== Condition ==
Since it was created in 1975, the mural has never been repainted or altered. It was painted over in 2020 to make way for a mural honoring Major Taylor. James McQuiston was not happy about how this was handled.

== See also ==
- Untitled (Urban Wall)
- Color Fuses
- Untitled (Hoosier mural)
