= Woollen, Molzan and Partners =

American architecture and design firm

- Formerly: Evans Woollen and Associates; Woollen Associates
- Founded: 1955
- Founder: Evans Woollen III
- Defunct: 2011
- Fate: Dissolved
- Headquarters: Indianapolis, Indiana, United States
- Services: Architecture, Interior Design, Planning

Woollen, Molzan and Partners (WMP) is an American second-generation architecture, interior design, and planning firm that Evans Woollen III founded in Indianapolis, Indiana, United States, in 1955. The firm was previously known as Evans Woollen and Associates and Woollen Associates. It remained in business for more than fifty-five years before closing its doors in 2011. Woollen began by designing mid-century modern residences, but the firm's design projects expanded to include a diverse portfolio of designs for libraries, worship facilities, museums, performing arts centers, private residences, public housing, and correctional facilities, among other projects.

Notable examples of the firm's work in Indianapolis that are among the city's most significant modern-style buildings include Clowes Memorial Hall, the Minton-Capehart Federal Building, the White River Gardens Conservatory, the west entrance and atrium addition to The Children's Museum of Indianapolis, and the Indianapolis Public Library's Central Library addition. Notable project elsewhere in Indiana include the Cushwa-Leighton Library at Saint Mary's College in Notre Dame; Indiana University's Musical Arts Center in Bloomington; and Saint Menrad Archabbey's monastery and library in Spencer County. The firm also designed urban renewal projects outside of Indiana such as the Over-the-Rhine Pilot Center in Cincinnati, Ohio, in addition to academic libraries at the University of Illinois at Urbana–Champaign, Central Michigan University, and Asbury University, among other projects. The firm's work has been featured in numerous books, periodicals, and online resources. Its projects have also received at least twenty awards from the American Institute of Architects.

== History ==
White River Gardens / Indianapolis, Indiana/ Photographer: Balthazar Korab

St. Maria Goretti Catholic Church / Westfield, Indiana / Photographer: Kevin F. Huse

The architectural firm was founded in 1955 and was known as Evans Woollen and Associates and Woollen Associates before it incorporated as Woollen Molzan and Partners in 1982. The firm was small in size, but it designed a wide range of projects that included commercial, religious, and government buildings, as well as academic buildings and correctional facilities, among other works. It ceased operations in 2011.

=== Founding in Indianapolis ===
Twenty-seven-year-old Evans Woollen III (1927–2016), who received a B.A. and an M.Arch. degree from Yale School of Architecture in 1952, founded the architectural firm in his hometown of Indianapolis, Indiana, in 1955. At Yale, Woollen studied under modern architects Philip Johnson, Louis Kahn, Paul Schweikher, and John M. Johansen. Woollen also apprenticed at Johnson's firm in New Canaan, Connecticut, and worked on his own for two years before returning to Indianapolis.

=== Partners ===
In 1968 Woollen formed a partnership with Lynn Molzan, a Tacoma, Washington, native who joined the Indianapolis-based firm in 1965. Evans Woollen and Associates incorporated as Woollen Associates in 1968; after the addition of more partners, it was incorporated and renamed Woollen, Molzan and Partners in 1982. In addition to Woollen and Molzan, the principals of the firm included, among others, Laurence R. O'Connor; William Brady, who joined the firm in 1980; and Kevin Huse, who joined the firm in 1985 and later served as its president. The firm remained in operation for more than five decades. Woollen sold his interest in the firm and retired from the practice around 2001. Woollen Molzan employed as many as nine licensed architects during the 1990s; by 2006 it had only four. The architectural firm was dissolved and closed in April 2011; architects Molzan, Huse, and Mike Brannan joined Ratio Architects Inc., a local competitor.

Woollen initially maintained an office on Indianapolis's Monument Circle in downtown Indianapolis. In 1980 the firm's leaders acquired the historic Majestic Building, restored it, and maintained its offices there for several years. When Woollen Molzan closed in 2011, its headquarters were located on South Kentucky Avenue in Indianapolis.

== Design projects ==
The firm's wide range of modern building designs included banking facilities, libraries, office buildings, and churches, as well as academic buildings, performing-arts facilities, and correctional facilities. It was also involved in numerous historic preservation and urban-redevelopment projects.

=== 1960s residential designs ===
Initially, Woollen specialized in designs for private homes, but the firm's work soon expanded to include commercial and urban-design projects. Woollen's early commissions were primarily mid-century modern residences, such as the International-style home (ca. 1960–63) he designed for the Perlov family in Indianapolis. The project was featured in House and Garden magazine. For the Leibman residence (ca. 1962–64), another of Woollen's early residential commissions that was featured in House Beautiful and House and Garden magazines, he created a modern interpretation of an old peasant farmhouse in southern Italy. The cluster house had two circular structures with conical roofs.

=== 1960s commercial projects ===
Woollen's notable early commercial projects that were built in Indianapolis included Fesler Hall (1962), an addition to the John Herron Art Institute, and Clowes Memorial Hall (1963), which he co-designed John M. Johansen. Clowes Hall was built on the campus of Butler University. These two buildings are notable for their exposed concrete slabs, which are typical of the Brutalism architecture style. The $3.5 million Clowes Hall project, which included a 2,200-seat concert hall for the university and the Indianapolis Symphony Orchestra, was the firm's first major work. Since its opening in 1963, the architectural community has praised its bold design, and its success led to other major commissions, including the design of other performing-arts facilities. Another of the firm's early projects was the modern design for the Marian University library (1966) in Indianapolis. It was the firm's first academic library, which also became a specialty of the firm.

In addition to these works, the firm designed the twenty-floor John J. Barton Tower (1967) in Indianapolis. The estimated $3.5 million project was the first high-rise apartment building in the city that provided low-cost housing for senior citizens. Some of its critics described the tower as "ungainly" and "awkward," but it received international coverage in architecture journals for its "inventive take on public housing." The firm also designed several banking facilities for the American Fletcher National Bank (a predecessor to the present-day Chase Bank in Indianapolis) and became known for designing religious buildings. One of its notable early churches was Saint Thomas Aquinas Church (1968) in Indianapolis. It received an Indiana Society of Architects award for its bold, geometric design.

=== 1970s commissions ===
Minton-Capehart Federal Building/ Indianapolis, Indiana

The firm's major commissions in the 1970s included the Indiana University's Musical Arts Center (1972) in Bloomington and the Minton-Capehart Federal Building (1976) in Indianapolis. The IU project, another example of Woollen's interpretation of the Brutalist style, includes work and storage spaces arranged around a cylindrical, 1,500-seat opera house. The $20 million Minton-Capehart Federal Building, which fills in the east side of the Indiana World War Memorial Plaza, was also designed in the "Brutalist architecture style. The federal building includes a rainbow-colored mural by graphic artist Milton Glaser that wraps around the exterior's base. Some have called the block-long, six-story building a "pigeon coop" and "the ugliest building in Indianapolis." However, architects consider the massive building as one of the city's few "cutting-edge designs from the 1970s." In addition to these projects, the firm designed the 45-room New Harmony Inn (1975) at historic New Harmony, Indiana. and the renovation of a community auditorium.

=== Urban-redevelopment projects ===
Community redevelopment became a major area of focus for the firm in the 1970s. The firm's design for the $2.5 million Pilot Center (1972–84) in the Over-the-Rhine neighborhood of Cincinnati, Ohio, was a milestone in its professional development. It was here that Woollen and O'Connor first initiated the firm's "live-in" approach to its design process that encouraged client and community stakeholder participation.The U.S. Department of Housing and Urban Development provided funding to build the Pilot Center, which was a grouping of four, mixed-use buildings (a recreational center, a senior citizens center, a Montessori school and daycare center, and a meeting and event space) within a two-block area.

The firm was also involved in several major renovations that repurposed older buildings in Indianapolis into inner-city housing. Its adaptive reuse projects turned the former Saint Agnes Academy, a former headquarters of the Carpenter's Union, and the former Saint Vincent's Hospital on North Illinois Street into apartment buildings and saved the aging structures from demolition. The hospital renovation, whose construction cost was $3.5 million, was the U.S. Department of Housing and Urban Development's largest rehabilitation project in Indiana. Renamed the Weyerbacher Terrace, the project's 296 units opened for rental in 1975. (The hospital building was later remodeled and became part of the present-day Ivy Tech Community College campus.)

=== 1980s projects ===
Churches, libraries, museums, historic renovations, and performing-arts facilities continued to be hallmarks of the firm's work in the 1980s, which included several major projects. In 1979 the firm began design work at St. Meinrad Archabbey, a Benedictine monastery in Spencer County, Indiana. The archabbey is one of only two s in the United States. The firm's architectural designs included a new monastery and academic library, in addition to renovation of the historic archabbey church. Saint Andrew's Abbey Church (1985–86) in Cleveland, Ohio, another of the firm's major works in the 1980s, has an asymmetrical exterior and striking modern sanctuary of exposed steel, concrete walls, and an upward-sloping ceiling. The firm also designed churches in Indianapolis, including Saint Phillip's Church (1986) and a modern addition (1983–89) to Christ Church Cathedral, an Indianapolis landmark on Monument Circle.

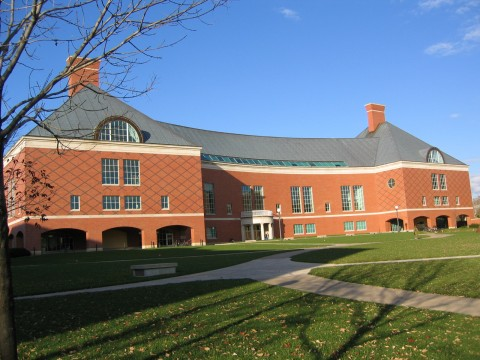
Grainger Engineering Library

The award-winning Cushwa-Leighton Library (1981–82) at Saint Mary's College in Notre Dame, Indiana was another notable project in the firm's academic library portfolio. The library was one of the five winners of the AIA/ALA Library Building Award for 1983. The Grainger Engineering Library (1984) at the University of Illinois at Urbana–Champaign was also a notable project for the firm. University officials believed that its design would serve as a "model for future academic libraries."

The firm also designed the west atrium entrance (1989) to The Children's Museum of Indianapolis as part of a multi-phase update to make it less intimidating for children, but still capable of handling more than a million visitors annually. In addition to a new entrance, the four-story addition included gallery space, a gift shop, a restaurant, a box office, and an information desk.

Moody Music Center / University of Alabama - Tuscaloosa / Photographer: Balthazar Korab

Another of the firm's notable performing-arts buildings was the Moody Music Center (1983–90) on the University of Alabama campus in Tuscaloosa. The firm also completed several historic preservation projects during the 1980s. Notable examples in Indianapolis include restorations of the Indiana Theatre, the main shed of Union Station, the Majestic Building, and Christ Church Cathedral.

=== 1990s projects ===
The 1990s began with the completion of the historic renovation of Hall Auditorium on the campus of Miami University in Oxford, Ohio. The firm also began work on the Wabash Valley Correctional Facility, the first all-new prison facility in Indiana in over a hundred years. This project started the firm's work in the correctional market. Other major work in the 1990s included churches such as Holy Cross Lutheran Church (1990) and Saint Monica's Church (1993) in Indianapolis and a contemporary design for the White River Gardens Conservatory (1999) at the Indianapolis Zoo.

=== 2000–2011 projects ===
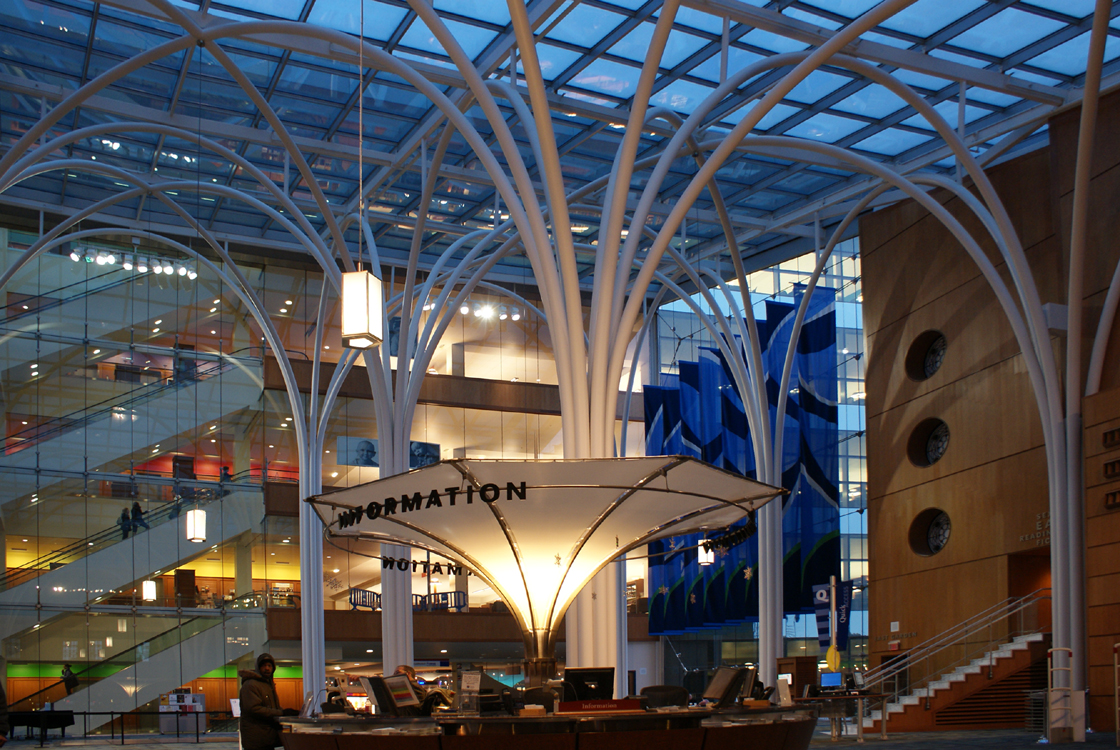
Indianapolis Public Library / Central Library / Photographer: Jeffrey A. Kisling

The Indianapolis Central Library addition and atrium project (2007) was Woollen Molzan's largest commission and the final one before Evans Woollen III retired from the firm. The project included restoration of the Indianapolis Public Library's historic Central Library, which was designed by Paul Philippe Cret and built in 1917, and a new, six-story curved-glass and steel structure that connected to the Cret building through an expansive atrium. The firm was commissioned in 2001 to design the new building, but work was temporarily halted in 2004 due to construction problems and subsequent lawsuits. The Woollen Molzan firm was eventually released from the project, which cost an estimated $150 million; however, the library addition was completed in 2007 using its design. Woollen Molzan's lawsuit with the library was settled in 2006. The firm paid the library $580,000, but denied accusations that the building had design flaws, and the library paid the Woollen Molzan firm $130,000 in fees. The library's structural consultants "were exonerated in court" in 2009; "it is generally accepted that the innocence extended to Woollen, Molzan too."

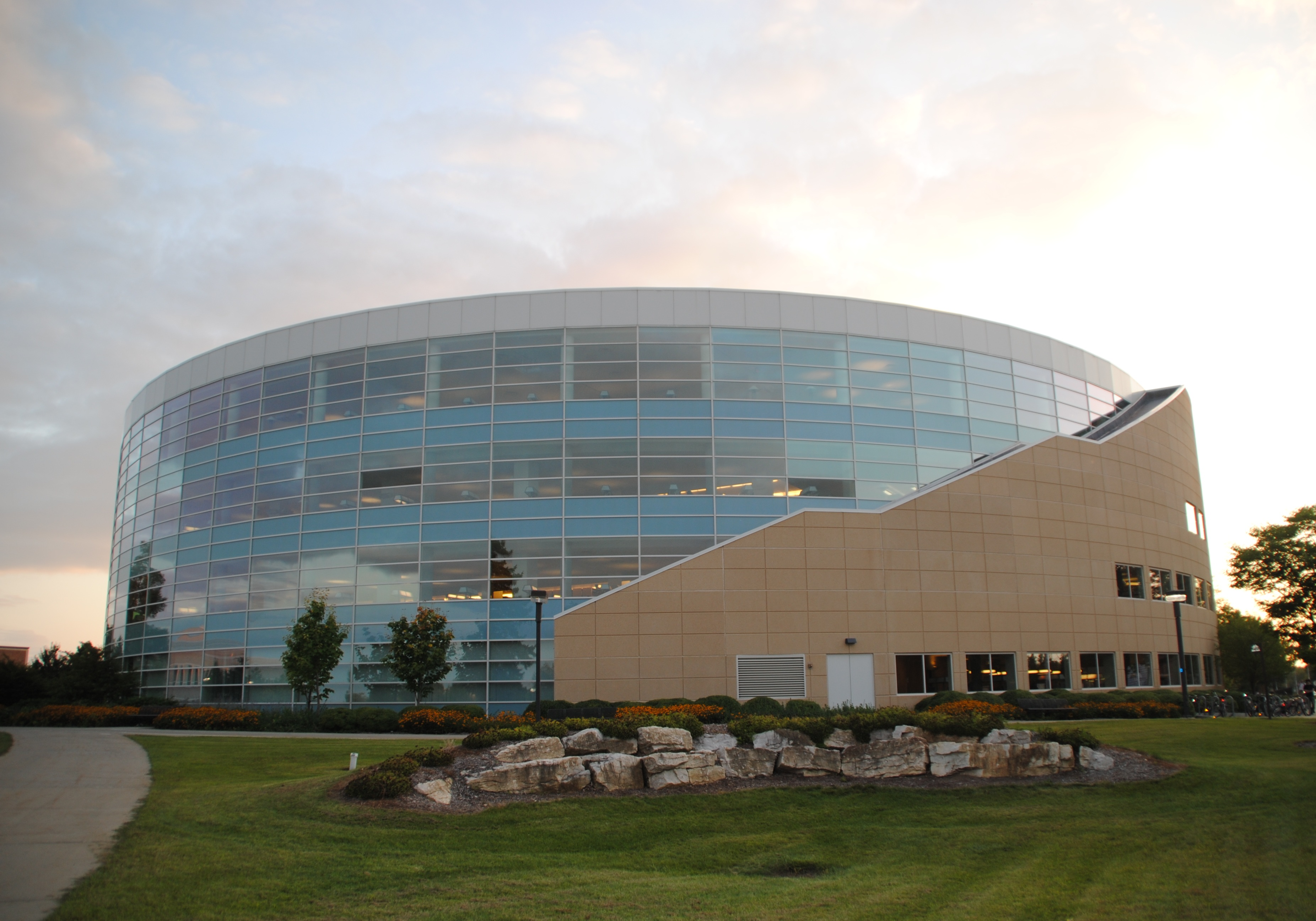
Charles V. Park Library, Central Michigan University

In its final years of operation, the firm designed several major academic buildings. These included ACES (2001), a $21 million project to create the College of Agricultural, Consumer, and Environmental Sciences Library, Information, and Alumni Center at the University of Illinois at Urbana-Champaign; the Kinlaw Library and Kirkland Learning Resources Center (2001), which cost $14 million to construct at Asbury University in Wilmore, Kentucky; the Charles V. Park Library and Information Services Center (2002), a $50 million project at Central Michigan University in Mount Pleasant; and the David L. Rice Library (2006) at the University of Southern Indiana near Evansville. In 2010 the firm completed design work on its final project, a $3.4 million renovation of the historic Indianapolis City Market.

== Legacy ==
David L. Rice Library, University of Southern Indiana

Although it was a small firm, Woollen, Molzan and Partners developed a diverse portfolio since its establishment in 1955. Its major work focused on libraries, worship facilities, and academic buildings. The firm was considered one of Indianapolis's "foremost modernist architectural firms." Its projects were featured in numerous local, national, and international publications.

Noted for its bold, contemporary buildings and historic-preservation projects, the firm also took the structure's setting and history into consideration when developing its designs. Some of Woollen Molzan's most distinctive modern buildings in Indianapolis are still in use, including Clowes Hall, Barton Tower, the Minton-Capehart Federal Building, the White River Gardens Conservatory, and the addition to the Indianapolis Central Library, among others. Some of the firm's modern designs were criticized, such as the Minton-Capehart Federal Building and Barton Tower, but most of them were praised, especially Clowes Hall. Outside of Indianapolis, the firm's notable projects included libraries, such as the Cushwa-Leighton Library at Saint Mary's College in Notre Dame, Indiana; the David L. Rice Library at the University of Southern Indiana; the Grainger Engineering Library at the University of Illinois at Urbana-Champaign; and the Morris Library at Southern Illinois University, in Carbondale.

The firm's notable designs for churches included Saint Meinrad Archabbey's monastery and library in Spencer County, Indiana, and Saint Andrew's Abbey Church in Cleveland, Ohio. Its major designs for performing arts centers included Indiana University's Musical Arts Center in Bloomington and the Moody Music Center at the University of Alabama in Tuscaloosa.

The Woollen Molzan firm also managed the renovation and preservation of several historic structures that remain in use. Notable projects include the Indiana Theatre (the home of the Indiana Repertory Theatre), Union Station, the Majestic Building, and several historic apartment buildings such as the Blancherne, Link-Savoy, Hoosier, and Blackburn Terraces, all of which are in Indianapolis. The firm also contributed new design ides for mixed-use urban neighborhoods, including those featured in Cincinnati's Over-the-Rhine Pilot Center.

== Honors and awards ==
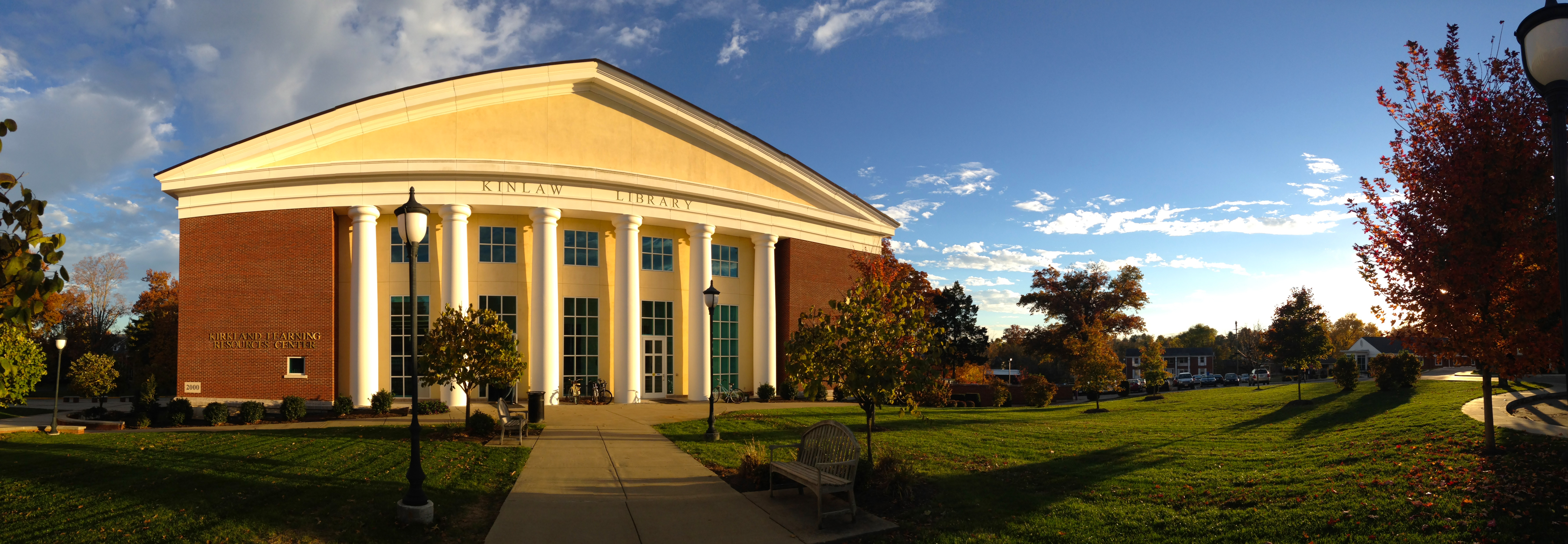
Kinlaw Library, Asbury University

- In 1964 Fortune magazine named Clowes Hall as one of the ten most important buildings completed between 1962 and 1964.
- The firm was the recipient of at least twenty awards from the American Institute of Architects, in addition to other awards it received nationally and internationally.
- American School and University magazine recognized the firm's projects in three of its annual Architectural Portfolio competitions. (The Kinlaw Library and Kirkland Learning Resources Center at Asbury College was recognized in the Outstanding Buildings, Specialized category in 2003; the Charles V. Park Library and Information Services Center at Central Michigan University in the Outstanding Design, Renovation/Modernization category in 2004; and the David L. Rice Library at the University of Southern Indiana in the Outstanding Designs, Post-Secondary category in 2006.)

== Selected projects ==
- ACES Library, Information and Alumni Center, College of Agriculture, Consumer, and Environmental Sciences, University of Illinois at Urbana-Champaign
- Archabbey Church of Our Lady of Einsiedeln, Saint Meinrad, Indiana
- Charles V. Park Library and Information Services Center, Central Michigan University, Mount Pleasant
- Christ Church Cathedral addition (1983–89), Indianapolis
- Church of Our Lady of Loretto, Saint Mary's College, Notre Dame, Indiana
- Clowes Memorial Hall, Butler University, Indianapolis
- Cushwa-Leighton Library (1981–82), Saint Mary's College, Notre Dame, Indiana
- David L. Rice Library, University of Southern Indiana, Evansville
- Fesler Hall (1962), Indianapolis
- Grainger Engineering Library (1987–95), University of Illinois at Urbana-Champaign
- Holy Cross Lutheran Church (1990), Indianapolis
- Indiana Theatre restoration (1982), Indianapolis
- Central Library addition (2007), Indianapolis
- John J. Barton Tower (1967), Indianapolis
- Kinlaw Library, Asbury University, Wilmore, Kentucky
- Leibman residence (ca. 1962–64), Indianapolis
- Majestic Building restoration (1984–91), Indianapolis
- Marian University Library (1966), Indianapolis
- Minton-Capehart Federal Building (1976), Indianapolis
- Moody Music Center (1983–90), University of Alabama, Tuscaloosa
- Morris Library, Southern Illinois University, Carbondale
- Musical Arts Center (1972), Indiana University, Bloomington
- New Harmony Inn (1975), New Harmony, Indiana
- Over-the-Rhine Pilot Center, (1972–84), Cincinnati, Ohio
- Perlov residence (ca. 1960–63), Indianapolis
- Saint Andrew's Abbey Church (1985–86), Cleveland, Ohio
- Saint Christopher's Episcopal Church, Carmel, Indiana
- Saint Maria Goretti Catholic Church, Westfield, Indiana
- Saint Meinrad Archabbey monastery and library renovation (1984), Spencer County, Indiana
- Saint Monica's Church (1993), Indianapolis
- Saint Phillip's Episcopal Church (1986), Indianapolis
- Saint Thomas Aquinas Church (1968), Indianapolis
- The Children's Museum of Indianapolis, west entrance and atrium addition (1989), Indianapolis
- Union Station main shed restoration (1986), Indianapolis
- University Library, St. Ambrose University, Davenport, Iowa
- Wabash Valley Correctional Facility, Carlisle, Indiana
- Hilbert Conservatory, White River Gardens, Indianapolis (1999)
