= Clowes Memorial Hall =

Performing arts center in Indianapolis, Indiana, US

Clowes Memorial Hall of Butler University
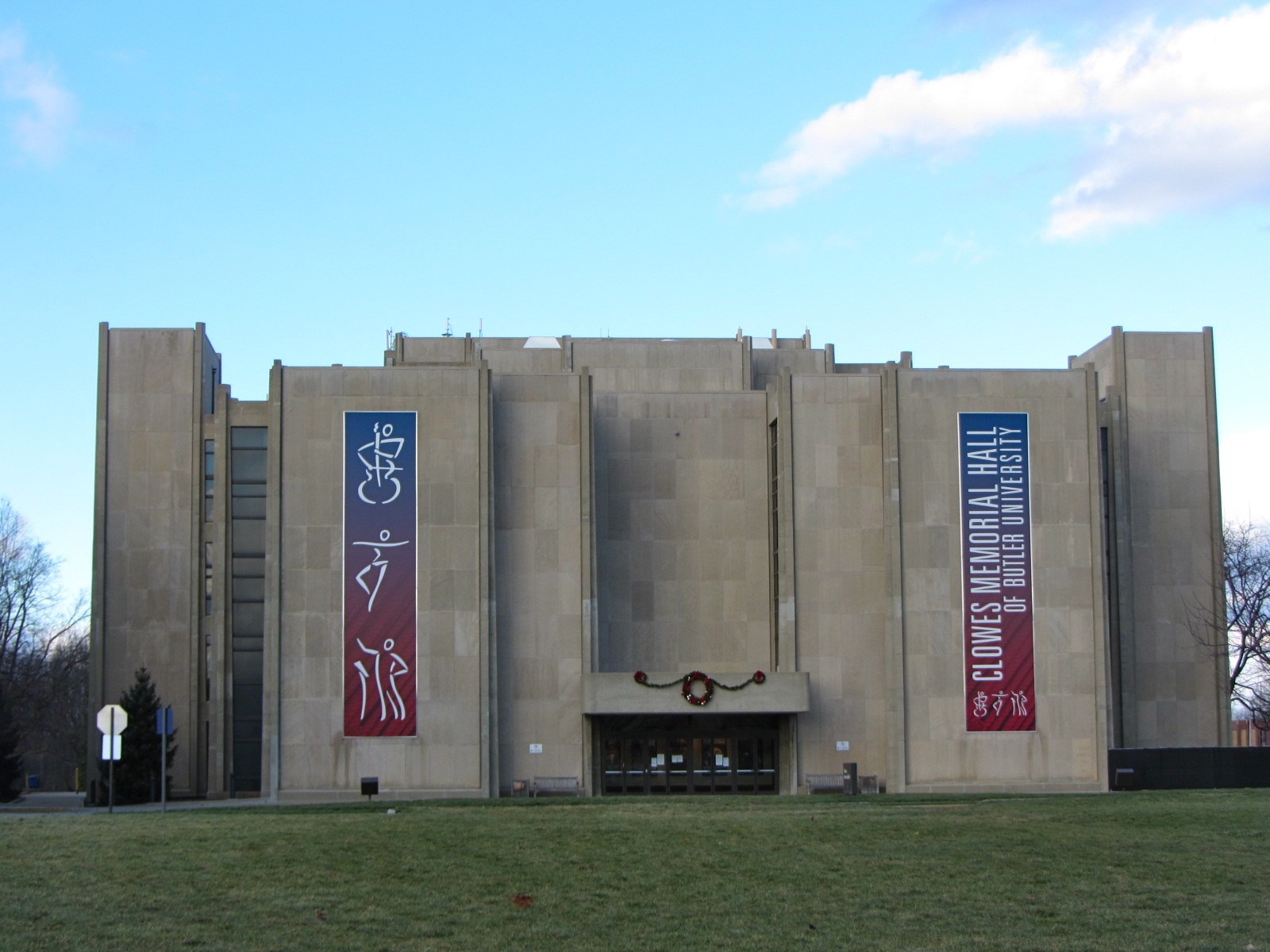
- Clowes Memorial Hall in 2012

- Location of Clowes Memorial Hall in Indiana
- Address: 4602 Sunset Avenue; Indianapolis, Indiana; United States
- Coordinates: 39.840278°N 86.169722°W
- Owner: Butler University
- Operator: Butler University
- Capacity: 2,096; 2,172 possible
- Current use: Performing arts

Construction
- Opened: October 18, 1963; 63 years ago
- Years active: 1963–present
- Architects: Evans Woollen III and John M. Johansen

Website
- www.butlerartscenter.org/venue/clowes-memorial-hall

Clowes Memorial Hall, officially known as Clowes Memorial Hall of Butler University, is a performance hall located on the campus of Butler University in Indianapolis, Indiana, United States. Opened October 18, 1963, it hosts numerous significant concerts, orchestras, musicals, plays, and guest speakers. Clowes Hall anchors the Butler Arts and Events Center, which includes the Schrott Center for the Arts, Shelton Auditorium, the Eidson-Duckwall Recital Hall, and the Lilly Hall Studio Theatre.

== History ==
Clowes (/kluːz/) Memorial Hall, which opened in 1963, was co-designed by noted Indianapolis architect Evans Woollen III, of Woollen, Molzan and Partners, and John M. Johansen, a well-known architect who established his practice in New Canaan, Connecticut. The performing hall is notable for its exposed concrete slabs, which are typical of the Brutalist architecture style. Woollen served as the junior partner in the project but was the "driving force behind its design and detail." Since it opened, the architectural community has praised its bold design. In 2021, a six-person panel of American Institute of Architects (AIA) Indianapolis members identified the venue among the ten most "architecturally significant" buildings completed in the city since World War II.

The design for the 24,000 sq ft (2,200 m^{2}), $3.5 million building was a controversial one. Still, Allen Whitehill Clowes, son of George Henry Alexander Clowes, for whom the building is named, supported Woollen's proposal. Johanson had been Woollen's professor at Yale and was a former classmate of Allen Clowes at Harvard University.

Clowes, a former director of biochemical research for Eli Lilly and Company, maintained a lifetime love of the arts. With the help of his wife and Butler University, the Clowes Fund was created to help build the performing arts facility. The building was initially intended to be used by both Butler University and the Indianapolis Symphony Orchestra. This joint venture continued until 1984 when the orchestra purchased, renovated, and moved to the historic Hilbert Circle Theatre on Monument Circle in downtown Indianapolis.

== Notable performances ==
In addition to being the former home of the Indianapolis Symphony Orchestra, Clowes Memorial Hall has been home to a number of notable music performances and productions. In 2011, Indianapolis-born Adam Lambert recorded his Glam Nation Tour at the venue for the Glam Nation Live CD/DVD set.

== Seating capacity ==
| Seating area | Capacity |
|---|---|
| Main Floor | 1,218 |
| First Terrace and Boxes | 307 |
| Second Terrace and Boxes | 289 |
| Third Terrace and Boxes | 282 |
| Pit Seating (limited viewing seats) | 76 |
| Total capacity | 2,172 |

== See also ==
- List of music venues in the United States
- List of attractions and events in Indianapolis
