= Grainger Engineering Library =

Library at the University of Illinois Urbana–Champaign

Coordinates: 40.1124°N 88.2268°W

Grainger Engineering Library Information Center
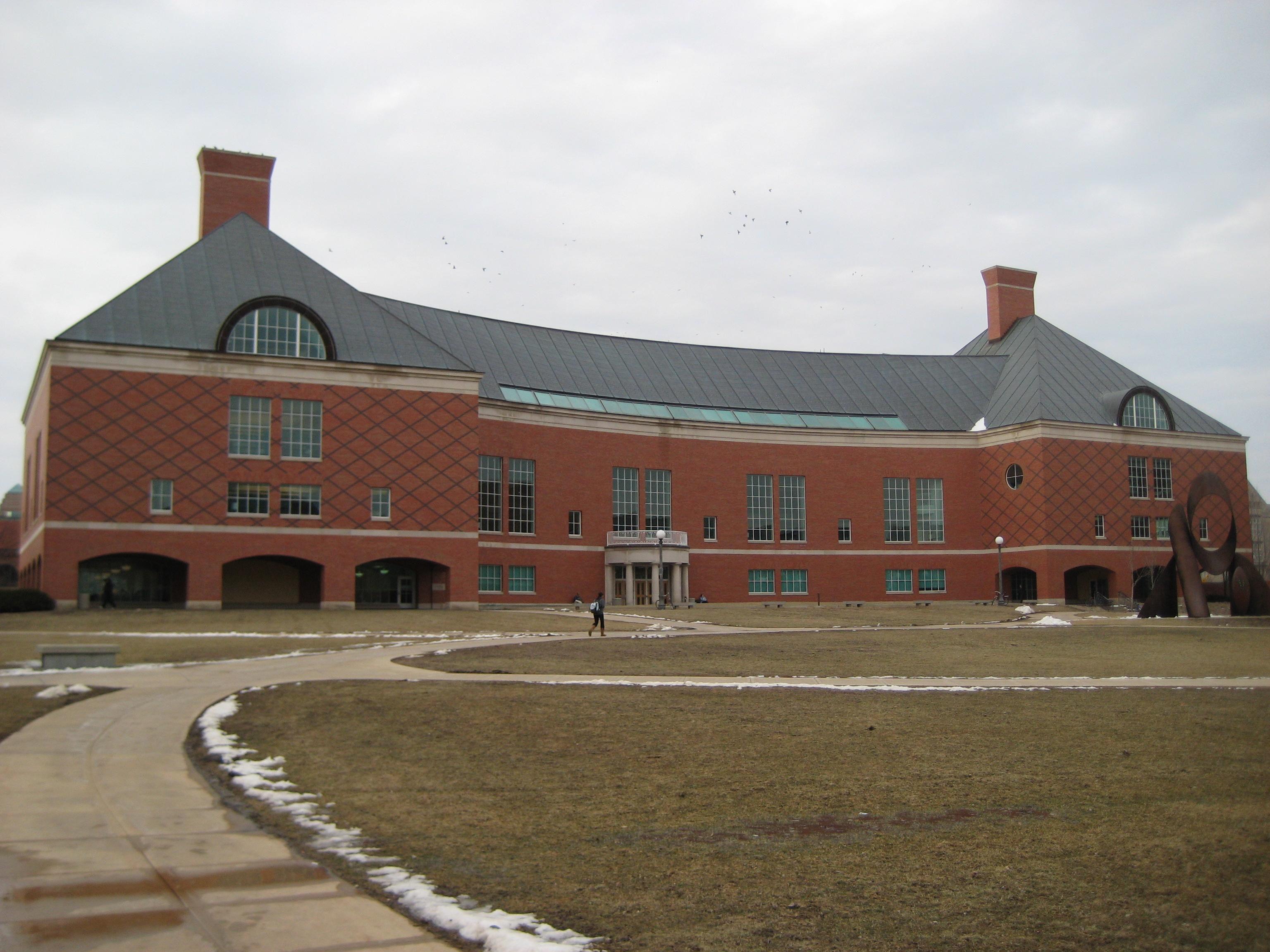
- The library in 2008
- Location: 1301 West Springfield Avenue, Urbana, Illinois 61801; United States
- Established: October 14, 1994

Other information
- Director: William H. Mischo
- Website: http://www.library.illinois.edu/enx/

The Grainger Engineering Library Information Center (GELIC) is a library at the University of Illinois at Urbana–Champaign Grainger College of Engineering for all disciplines of engineering at the university. It is situated on the north side of the Bardeen Quad on the engineering campus along Springfield Avenue. It is the largest library in the United States for the study of engineering. It is one of several "departmental" libraries that constitute the University of Illinois at Urbana–Champaign University Library.

== History ==
The Grainger Engineering Library Information Center was designed to be a model for future academic libraries. It was made possible by William Wallace Grainger, a University of Illinois electrical engineering graduate, class of 1919. He made his fortune by launching a small, mail-order electrical supplies and components business that eventually grew into W. W. Grainger, a Fortune 500 industrial supply company. He felt a professional commitment to make technology accessible to everyone, and it was in that spirit that his son, David Grainger, donated more than $18 million to fund the construction of the new library Information Center. In recognition of his contribution, a brass relief of Grainger was placed in the first floor lobby of the library.

The Grainger Engineering Library was dedicated on the 59th anniversary of the University of Illinois' foundation, October 14, 1994. The proceedings, entitled a "Gateway to a New Era", established the largest engineering library in the country, with over 92,000 square feet (8,500 m^{2}) holding more than 300,000 volumes. The ribbon-cutting ceremony was a purely digital affair. President Stanley Ikenberry, Chancellor Michael Aiken, and David Grainger, representing his father, William Wallace Grainger, pressed assigned areas on a computer touch screen to change a computerized red ribbon into a visual explosion of fireworks.

== Overview ==
The Grainger Library contains five different levels, with a center area, west area, and east area. On the first floor center area are the south main entrance, the north entrance, the main circulation desk, a computer area, and a printing station. In the fall of 2015, a coffee shop was added behind the elevators. The west area of the first floor contains quiet study spaces with desks for multiple people to work together, and the east area is mostly administration offices.

The second and third floors are entirely quiet floors. On the second and third floor, the center area contains a two-story Main Reading Gallery, which can seat 1,254 people. The west and east area both have two sections, a one-story area on each floor and two-story reading galleries at the ends that can each accommodate approximately 100 people. The galleries are also used for special events and dinners. Books are mostly located on the third floor west and east areas, with some in the second floor east area. The second floor west area mostly contains study carrels.

The fourth floor contains the Center for Academic Resources in Engineering (CARE), which has tutors and exam study sessions for students. The east part of the center area contains an EWS (Engineering Workstation) computer lab with Windows-based computers, while the west part has collaboration tables and frosted glass that acts as whiteboards. There are two large rooms used for exam study sessions and staffed with tutors. The west area contains more collaboration tables, and is surrounded with group study rooms which students can reserve online. The east area is a quiet study carrel area.

The basement of Grainger is a quiet floor with large tables in the center area and west area. The east area contains a computer lab that is operated as a computer-based testing facility.

The facility contains three large seminar rooms (seating around 50 people) and four smaller conference rooms. When the building opened, it had 60 networked computers, 100 terminals, seven information kiosks, and six servers. The building offers group study rooms, individual study carrels, faculty and scholar studies and conference rooms. It was so technically advanced that the furniture had to be custom-designed because no one had ever had data and power connected to every seat on this scale before.

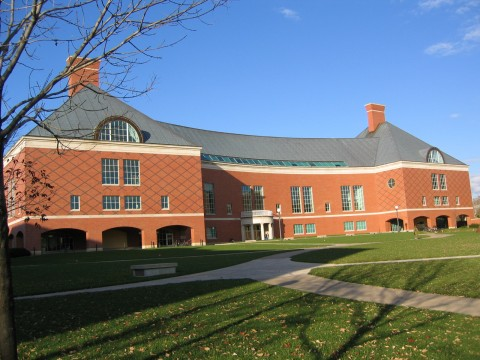
Grainger Engineering Library

== Computing and technologies ==
The Grainger Engineering Library Information Center provides computing facilities including:

- Three computer and multi-media labs with over 100 engineering workstations, which are used for CAD, numerical analysis and modeling, and software development
- A digital imaging lab housing the Digital Library Initiative Projects, which provides access to 62,000 full-text journal articles; an information retrieval laboratory for visitors and researchers utilizing Grainger and campus resources
- Two instructional services labs, which serve as high-tech classrooms for information literacy instruction and presentations

In addition, public-use terminals have been placed throughout the building that provide access to a statewide online catalog, Compendex, INSPEC, Aerospace Database, National Technical Information Service (NTIS), 1,000 full-text journals, and a wealth of local information resources. With more than 1.5 million people using the building in 2000, it was the second most visited study area on campus, second only to the Illini Union.

== Social and financial resources ==
A big social resource that drove this project was the need for a new library for the engineering department. The College of Engineering had almost 5,000 students, but the current library only had 120 seats and could only house 50,000 books.

The Grainger Engineering Library Information Center opened to the public in March 1994. This $34 million multifunctional facility was primarily funded by a gift of $18.7 million from the Grainger Foundation Inc., headquartered in Lake Forest, Illinois. An additional $11 million of State and gift funds was spent on the project for the rerouting of steam, electrical, and telecommunications lines, the demolition of several buildings, and the construction of the new Engineering Quad (which had been under consideration since at least 1926).

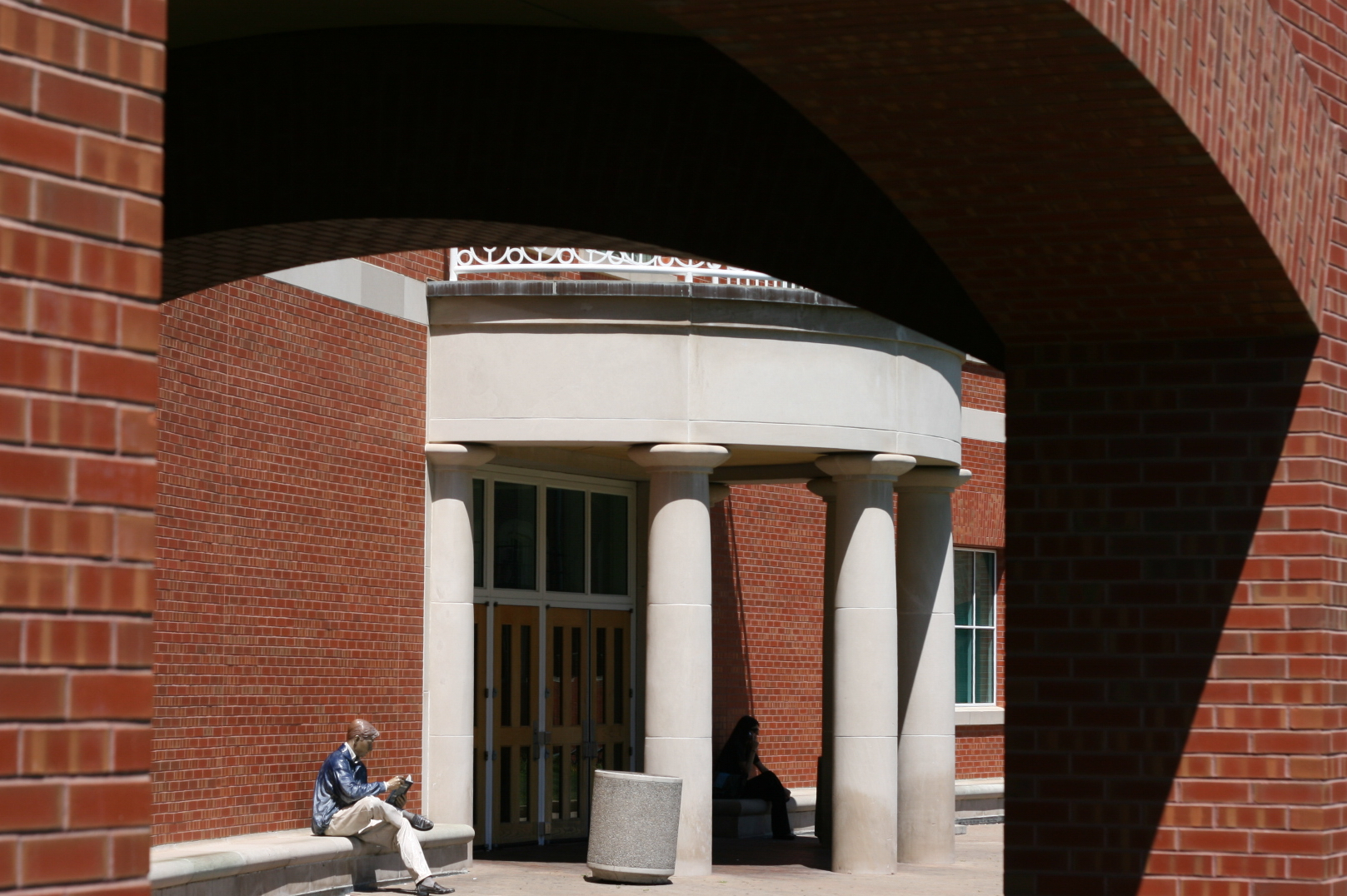
Computing a Future statue by John Seward Johnson II at south entrance

== Design and construction ==
=== Design ===
The library was designed by noted Indiana architect Evans Woollen III and his firm, Woollen, Molzan and Partners, based in Indianapolis. Academic libraries were one of the firm's design specialties.

=== Safety and precautionary steps ===
In building the library, the Construction Management and Design Team were asked to estimate the construction costs, the schedule of the project and the environmental impact on the surrounding areas. The environmental factors included noise, dust, water and debris control. In addition, contractors needed to control the amount of pollution they were ejecting into the atmosphere. The noise and dust risks were minimized through the use of muffled hammers and exhausts. The contractors were required to control the surface water in order to minimize damage to the project and adjacent buildings. They needed to provide and operate hydraulic equipment of adequate capacity to control the surface water.

=== Issues affecting the cost and schedule ===
The construction of the library was interrupted when the university experienced a flood. The project was on track and two months away from completion when the flood brought 7 to 8 feet (2.4 m) of water into the basement. The water flushed through the steam tunnels and eventually made its way to Grainger's basement. There was worry that the water's weight could have strained the building structural integrity but since the stress was spread so evenly, the building was not critically damaged. Nevertheless, the basement had to be redone and the project was delayed three months.

The initial plan in the construction of Grainger did not include a north entrance. It was deemed too expensive to have a second entrance because of the security risk. In addition to metal detectors and such, both doors must be worked during operating hours of the library. Even so, due to the number of request from faculties and students coming in from the north side, a second entrance was built. Due to the above issues, the project was over budget and was behind schedule by approximately two months.

=== Personnel involved ===
There were three university clients involved Capital Programs, Operation and Maintenance, and the Engineering school. The project was done with a construction manager, P.K. DeMars. In addition, there were 28 subcontractor contracts (not including the 20 or so for furniture). Some consultants hired on the project were an acoustician and a lighting specialist.

- Architect: Woollen, Molzan and Partners
- Structural engineer: Lemessurier Consultants
- Mechanical-electrical engineer: Henneman, Raufeisen & Associates
- University's project manager: Tim Kerestes
- Lighting specialist: Bill Lam
