= Roland Hobart =

Austrian artist (1940–2020)

Roland O. Hobart
- Born: December 25, 1940; Innsbruck, Austria
- Died: October 29, 2020 (aged 79); Indiana, United States
- Education: Akademie der bildenden Künste Wien
- Known for: Printmaking, painting, drawing
- Notable work: Untitled (Urban Wall) (1973)

Roland Hobart (25 December 1940 – 29 October 2020) was an Austrian artist who arrived in the United States in 1966 to participate in the L. S. Ayres "Import Fair" and later became a leading mural artist in Downtown Indianapolis, a well-known screen printing artist, and educator.

== Biography ==
=== Early life and education ===
Roland O. Hobart was a native of Innsbruck, where he studied mural painting at an early age. He then toured for a year in Europe working at different galleries before enrolling in the Akademie der bildenden Künste Wien and opening a printing business.

=== Shelbyville ===
Hobart moved to Shelbyville, Indiana, in 1966 from Austria and lived on the 21-acre (8.5 ha) property of Richard and Thelma ('Tee') Fleming, who helped arrange for him to stay and sponsored his art production. In Shelbyville, Hobart set up a studio just off one of the city's main streets in 1972 where he printed his own arts and also reproduced arts for many artists nationwide until the 1980s. He was well known in Shelbyville for his work with children, famously designing an 80-by-15-foot (24.4 m × 4.6 m) sculpture for a number of Shelbyville Senior High School proms in the early 1970s.

In 1972, Hobart designed the Shelby County flag as part of the 1972 Shelby County Sesquicentennial celebration. The green and blue flag featured "Indiana symbols for Shelby County's famous cornfields, two bears symbolizing 'The Bears of Blue River,' and a diagonal blue stripe symbolizing the waters of Big Blue River which cut through the county".

=== Indianapolis ===
==== Indianapolis Sesquicentennial work ====
While Hobart worked as an artist for L.S. Ayres, his first significant commissioned came in 1970 from the Indianapolis Sesquicentennial Commission, when he was asked to create five original prints for the celebration of the Indianapolis Sesquicentennial (1971). Each of the five prints, which were unveiled in May 1971 represent an important aspect of the city.

- The first print is a five-point star encompassed by a circle representing the city's progress and its plans for the future.
- The second print features a sequence of consecutive diamond and circle shapes enclosed in a larger circle, "echoes a feeling of sound waves" to symbolized the social progress of both the city and its surrounding environment.
- The third print is a representation of the Indianapolis 500, a monumental event for Indianapolis communities.
- The fourth print depicts two stars within a large "I", enclosed by a circle. The number "150" crosses the middle of the print. This work represents the patriotism of Indianapolis and the 150 years the sesquicentennial honors.
- The fifth print depicts converging arrows within a circle, signifying Indianapolis as the "Crossroads of America." All five prints simultaneously represent downtown Indianapolis's Monument Circle, both a local and national identifier of the city. The prints were originally for sale and on view at L. S. Ayres and Jaycees office in downtown Indianapolis.

At the same time as the Sesquicentennial prints, Hobart also produced an original work for the International Conferences on Cities, a conference held in May 1971 and organized by J. Irwin Miller and Richard Lugar. This print depicts a view of the world from space, centered in a large "I" for Indianapolis. Hobart chose this design to represent all the nations present at the Conference on Cities.

==== Urban Walls ====
In August 1973 Hobart was selected as the first winner of the Urban Walls design contest, which was sponsored by National Endowment for the Arts and American Fletcher National Bank. The contest was judged by Carl Solway of Solway Galleries in Cincinnati, sponsor of the Urban Walls project there, Benjamin deBrie Taylor of the Herron School of Art, and Sylvia Zazas of Indianapolis.

==== Other projects ====
In the summer of 1973, Hobart's silk screen prints were displayed at the L.S. Ayres & Company Auditorium in downtown Indianapolis as part of a two-artist show. The prints displayed were created using his own unique silk screening process which entails using the squeegee like a paint brush to apply texture to the print.

In 1975, Hobart created a mural for the Great Hall of the Phi Kapp Psi fraternity on the campus of Wabash College. That same year he also served as the Visual Artist-in-Residence for the Indiana Boys' School to produce murals on the interior of the building with a grant from the Indiana Arts Commission and provide instructions in silk screen printing to allow the boys to create their own T-shirt designs. Hobart continued helping youth in Indianapolis create murals as part of the Urban Walls through 1976.

From 1976 to 1977 he taught at the Herron School for Art and Design as an adjunct professor.

In 1979, Hobart created two graphics of President Jimmy Carter, one sweating and one shivering. The graphics were made into thermostats: if the temperature on the thermostat rose above 78 degrees, Carter would begin to sweat, below 65 he would shiver. The thermostats were meant to encourage citizens to stay in the temperature regulations during the natural gas crisis of the late 1970s.

Hobart created the logo for the Indiana General Assembly in the 1970s, a design that is still in use today.

=== Bloomington ===
Hobart moved to Bloomington, Indiana, in the 1980s, where he continued his artistic career and began consulting for a variety of corporations, including Dynamesh, a company that supplies high quality mesh, screens, and screen printing supplies. Hobart also had a BMX freestyle team called Currents Designs. It included Wes Dausch and Dan Duncan from Bloomington and Jason Deckard from Ellettsville. Hobart also designed the Bloomington Indiana fish logo that can be seen on the roof the old courthouse on the square.
