= Color Fuses =

Mural by Milton Glaser in Indianapolis, Indiana

- Artist: Milton Glaser
- Year: 1975
- Type: Mural
- Location: Indianapolis, Indiana, United States
- Owner: General Services Administration

Color Fuses is an outdoor mural by the designer Milton Glaser that wraps around the entire ground floor of the Minton-Capehart Federal Building in downtown Indianapolis, Indiana, USA. While the building opened in 1975, the mural was finished in late 1974 and occupies the 672 feet around the entire portico of the building, rising 27 feet high, and showcasing 35 different colors in panels that vary in width between 6 and 36 feet. Originally, there was a programmed light system that pulsated light on the mural in a dynamic affect. Due to initial complaints, this system was dismantled shortly after it was installed, but completely re-installed and recreated when the mural was restored in 2012.

== Description ==
Stretching 672 feet, the mural contains 35 different colors that are blended together to create a sense of openness and a new sense of government. At the time, Glaser said, "The Colors really seemed like the right solution." The commissioning of the mural was a collaboration between the architect Evans Woollen, Glaser and the GSA's Art in Architecture program at a cost of $75,000. "The idea for the colored band at the base of the federal building did indeed come out of conversations I had with Evans Woollen." In response, Woollen refers to the mural as a "continuous Mark Rothko painting".

Painting for the mural was completed by Kite Inc. The work was technically difficult and required that a special blending technique be learned and employed. Work was completed from a small paper model that Glaser made for the project. Paint matching was completed by Devoe Paints stores of Indianapolis; exterior acrylic paint was originally used.

The original lighting system was designed to pulse on a two-minute cycle from a low light to full illumination and then back to low light.

== Historical information ==
While the artwork was frequently listed as a "Point of Interest" in local city guides in the 1980s, the artwork languished until funds were made available to modernize the building in 2011. The American Recovery and Reinvestment Act of 2009 allocated $50 million for the modernization of the interior and the complete restoration of "Color Fuses". Experts, including professional conservator-restorers, were engaged to oversee the re-painting, which was completed by Thomas Moore Studios of Baltimore, Maryland.

The lighting program was completely recreated with LED lights by Fisher Marantz Stone in a way that better created Glaser's original intentions with the design.

== Condition ==
The artwork was completely restored in 2012 to critical acclaim, and a short documentary film created by the GSA.

== See also ==
- Untitled (Urban Wall)
- The Runners (Urban Wall)
- Untitled (Hoosier mural)
