= Untitled (Urban Wall) =

Mural by Roland Hobart in Indianapolis, Indiana

Coordinates: 39°46′4.45″N 86°9′17.23″W

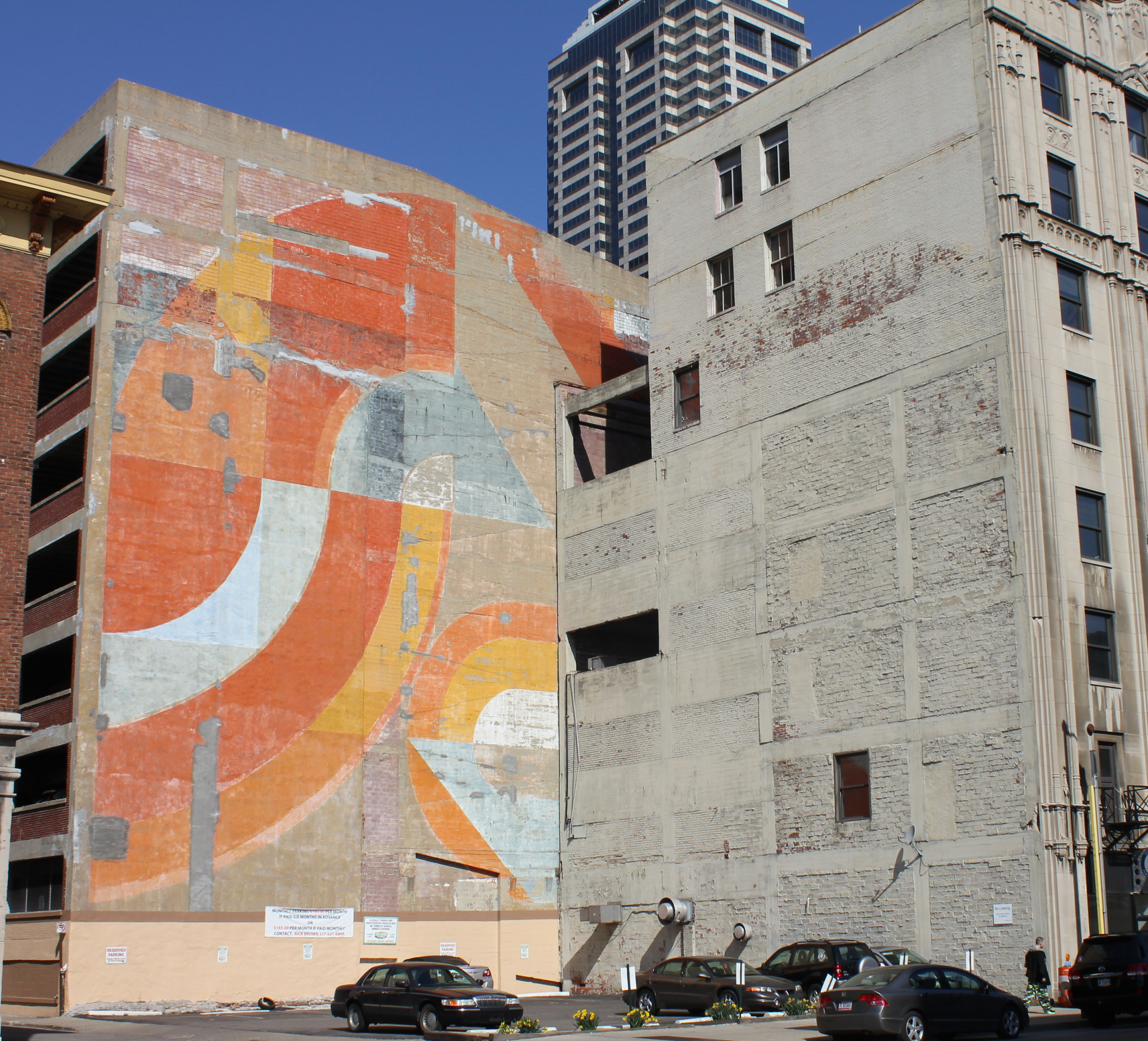
- Artist: Roland Hobart
- Year: 1973
- Type: Mural
- Location: Indianapolis, Indiana, United States
- Owner: City of Indianapolis

Untitled (Urban Wall) is an outdoor mural by Austrian artist Roland Hobart located at 32 North Delaware Street in downtown Indianapolis, Indiana. The mural originally occupied two exterior walls of two four-story commercial buildings at this site. The mural was commissioned by the City of Indianapolis for the Indianapolis Urban Walls Project in 1973. Fabrication of the mural began in September 1973 and finished by the end of the year.

== Description ==
When the mural was completed, Marion Simon Garmel described Untitled (Urban Wall) as “a complex puzzle of rectangles, pie-shaped wedges, quarter arcs and S curves in bold but earthy colors”. "Urban Wall" in Untitled refers to the Indianapolis Urban Walls Project, a region wide call to artists by the Indianapolis Department of Parks and Recreation to develop outdoor mural designs toward the beautification of downtown Indianapolis in hopes of drawing interest back downtown during the 1970s suburban flight.

Hobart's graphic mural is composed of bold geometric shapes of bright colors; mostly reds, yellows, and oranges with pops of blue, black, and white intermixed. Curved rectangular forms morph together to create color-blocked waves that cross the wall. Each larger curved shape is made from smaller rectangles, triangles and trapezoids.

== Historical information ==
The City of Indianapolis and the American Fletcher National Bank sponsored the development of Untitled (Urban Wall) as part of the 1973 Urban Walls Project. The National Endowment for the Arts matched a $3,500 contribution from the American Fletcher National Bank, all together providing $7,000 to fund the installation of the winning mural. Deputy Mayor Michael DeFabis named Hobart's mural the winner over four other finalists. Hobart received $700 for his winning design. His piece was the first of what was expected to be multiyear “Urban Walls Project" with many future installations. During the fabrication of Untitled (Urban Wall), which was completed by Naegele Outdoor Advertising under Hobart's supervision, Indianapolis was home to multiple other exterior murals, but Untitled (Urban Wall) was the first to be sponsored by the city. The Urban Walls Project utilized painting services of the city's unemployed and youth to complete the selected murals.

The mural was dedicated in the fall of 1973 by Richard Lugar and attended by Hobart and other city officials. Recently the mural has been getting more attention from Indianapolis residents and has begun to spark interest in having the work restored. In a 2016 interview Hobart responded to this interest by saying "I think today it would be even more appreciated, people are more cultured."

The cost of the project was about $10,000 and was intended to be part of an ongoing effort to produce Urban Walls throughout the city.

== Ownership history ==
Untitled (Urban Wall) was installed at its current location in 1973 and has been there since. During time of installation, Steven R. Skirvin and Thomas A. Moyahan owned the two buildings on which the mural was installed. Skirvin owned the Indiana Parking Company garage, which sits at 145. E. Market Street. and Moynahan the Union Title Building, which sits at 155 E. Market Street. Both company owners agreed to fund the preparation of the area for mural painting and installation and as well as any future maintenance.

Currently, the Indiana Parking Garage Association owns Skirvin's old Indiana Parking Company building. Moyahan's Union Title Building is now owned by Crown Barrister, LLC. The parking lot which fills the space between the two buildings is owned by Richard L. Brown Jr.

== Condition ==
Since it was created in 1973, the mural has never been repainted and the north section has been completely painted over. By 1977 the north wall of the mural had suffered damage from a water leak in the building which resulted in a call for its restoration, which never occurred.

Visible on the remaining section are concrete patches in the brick wall. Also visible at the bottom are parking signs and a large section of white paint.

== See also ==
- The Runners (Urban Wall)
- Color Fuses
- Untitled (Hoosier mural)
