= John M. Johansen =

American architect (1916–2012)

- Born: June 29, 1916; New York, New York, U.S.
- Died: October 26, 2012 (aged 96)

John MacLane Johansen (June 29, 1916 – October 26, 2012) was an American architect and a member of the Harvard Five. Johansen took an active role in the modern movement.

== Early life ==
Johansen was born to two accomplished painters, John Christen Johansen and M. Jean McLane, in New York City in 1916. Growing up in an artful family, Johansen said that his childhood was filled with spaces and enclosures, and his childhood fantasies are present in many of the designs he created during his adult years.

He went to Harvard University and was taught the fundamentals of modern architecture by Walter Gropius, the founder of the Bauhaus. While at Harvard, Johansen played for the Harvard Crimson men's soccer team as a striker. There, he earned first-team All-American honors in 1939. In 1939, he graduated the Harvard Graduate School of Design with a Masters in Architecture.

After World War II, Harvard graduates were highly sought after, and like many of his colleagues, Johansen was offered a job right on the spot. He proceeded to follow his career path starting out as a draftsman for Marcel Breuer. He then became a researcher for the National Housing Agency in Washington, D.C., and later joined the architect firm Skidmore, Owings and Merrill in New York. In 1948, Johansen settled down and established his practice in New Canaan, Connecticut, to accompany four of his other colleagues, Marcel Breuer, Philip Johnson, Landis Gores, and Eliot Noyes, collectively known as the Harvard Five. From 1955 to 1960, he was an adjunct professor at Yale School of Architecture, which had become a vigorous center for modernism.

At the time of his death, he was married to Ati Gropius Johansen, a noted art educator and adopted daughter of Walter Gropius and Gropius' second wife, Ilse, whose orphaned niece Ati was. They lived in Wellfleet, Massachusetts.

== Career ==
Johansen's designs stressed function over form, and focused on social, urban, and anthropological conditions, and strived to avoid creating overpowering megastructures. He started exploring the “box,” the single style to accompany the modern movement. Not only was the box economical, it was also easy to build, a stabilizer organizationally and aesthetically coherent. This investigation into such a structure led to the creation of Johansen House #1 in 1950, which was included in the Museum of Modern Art exhibit “Built in the U.S.A.” In 1955, his second box was built, this time a glass box; the McNiff House. In some of his houses, Johansen utilized Palladian elements such as the grotto, the classic cross plan, and the Palladian prototype of the central pavilion linked by low bridges to flanking pavilions. The Palladian prototype is most noticeably present in Villa Ponte, or the Warner House, built in 1957 in New Canaan, Connecticut. In 1969, he was elected into the National Academy of Design as an Associate member and became a full Academician in 1994.

== Works ==
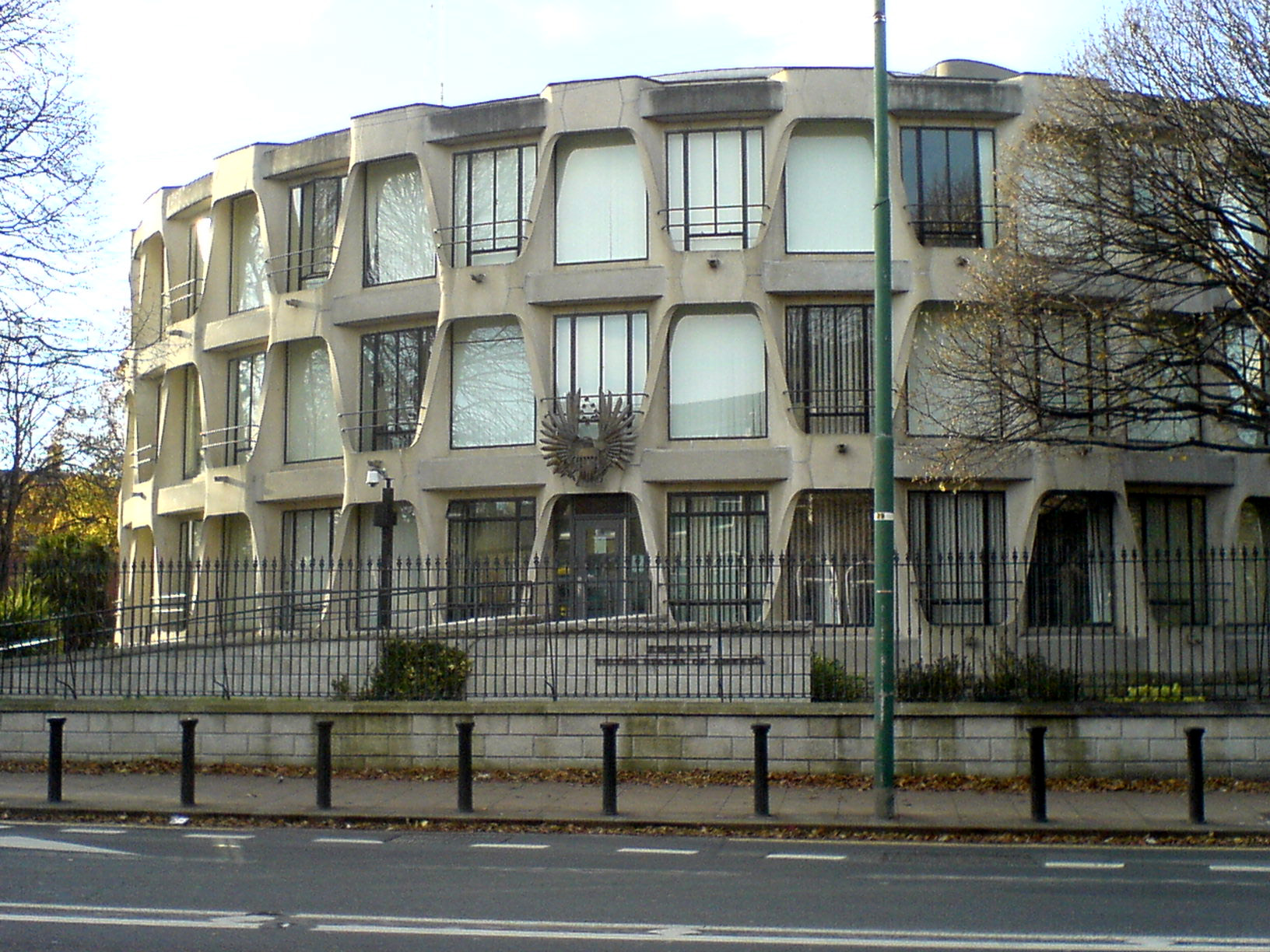
U.S. Embassy, Dublin

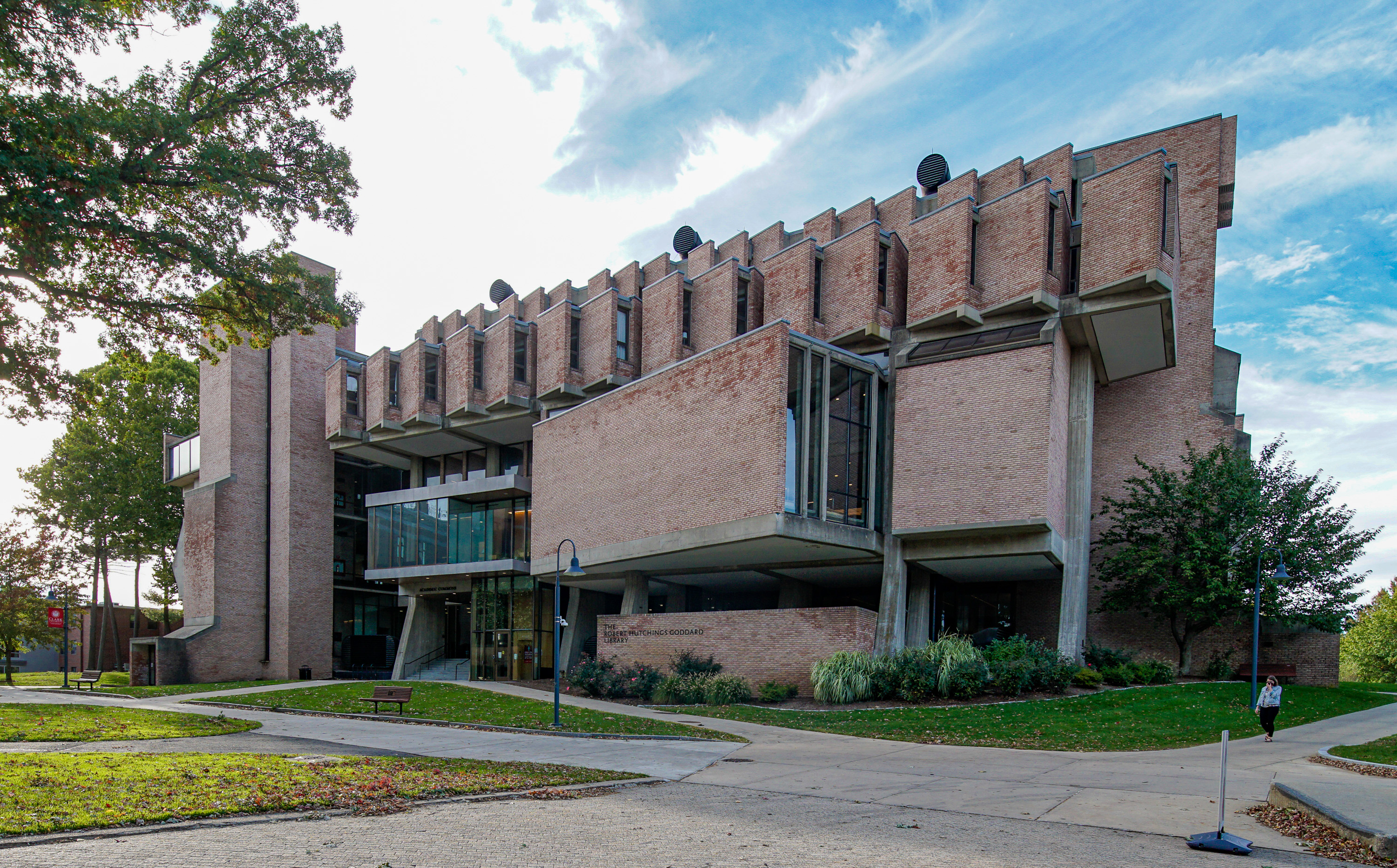
Robert H. Goddard Library, Clark University, Worcester, Massachusetts (1969)

Other notable residences include the Goodyear House (1955), an early example of the Palladian style employed by Johansen; the Bridge House (1957); the Telephone Pole House (1968) made from 104 forty-foot poles that brace the house into the side of a steep ravine; the Labyrinth House (1966) that has no windows but instead glass enclosures between one wall and another; and the Plastic Tent House (1975), made of translucent plastic.

Johansen was also known for his modern commercial buildings. The Morris A. Mechanic Theatre in Baltimore (1967) was characterized as “a highly sculptural centerpiece among more reserved office buildings.” It was the beginning of a series of buildings that stressed and embraced the functional parts of the buildings, allowing them to emerge while being increasingly identified and emphasized. The facility, unused since 2004 and deemed unsuitable for a theater, saw demolition activities commenced in 2014. It had been considered for landmark status and adaptive reuse, while its owners proposed redeveloping the site with residential and retail development. Celebrated by some and criticized by others for its Brutalist-style architecture, the building was listed on VirtualTourist's 2009 list of the "World's Top Ten Ugliest Buildings". Demolition was proposed in 2012, delayed, and commenced in September 2014.

The Robert H. Goddard Library (1969) at Clark University is one of Johansen's experiments and among his best-known designs. While creating this structure, he said, “I moved toward a more articulated design by emphasizing the distinction between the ponderous structural frame and other elements that appear to be less firmly attached conceivably detachable or interchangeable parts."

Another of his best-known buildings is the Mummers Theater in Oklahoma City (1970), an aggregation of fragmented units connected by walkways and tubes. It received an AIA award in 1972. The theater, more recently called Stage Center, was demolished in 2014 after years of maintenance costs, and a June 2010 flood led to its closure and consideration of alternative uses or demolition. In 2013 its owners declined a listing on the National Register of Historic Places. In July 2013, it was reported that the building would be sold, demolished, and replaced by a new 20 story tower; on January 16, 2014, the city's Downtown Design Review Committee voted 3–2 to approve demolition and make way for a new headquarters building for OGE Energy Corp. and a second building. Demolition began in July and was completed by October 2014. No tower was built.

Johansen co-designed with Indianapolis architect Evans Woollen III, one of his former students, the $3.5 million, 24,000-square-foot (2,200 m^{2}) Clowes Memorial Hall, a performing arts facility that opened in 1963 and is still in use on the campus of Butler University in Indianapolis. The Brutalist-style design was initially controversial, but after its opening the architectural community praised the facility's bold design. He was also the designer of the Discovery Museum And Planetarium in Bridgeport, CT.
