= White River Gardens =

Botanical gardens in Indianapolis, Indiana, US

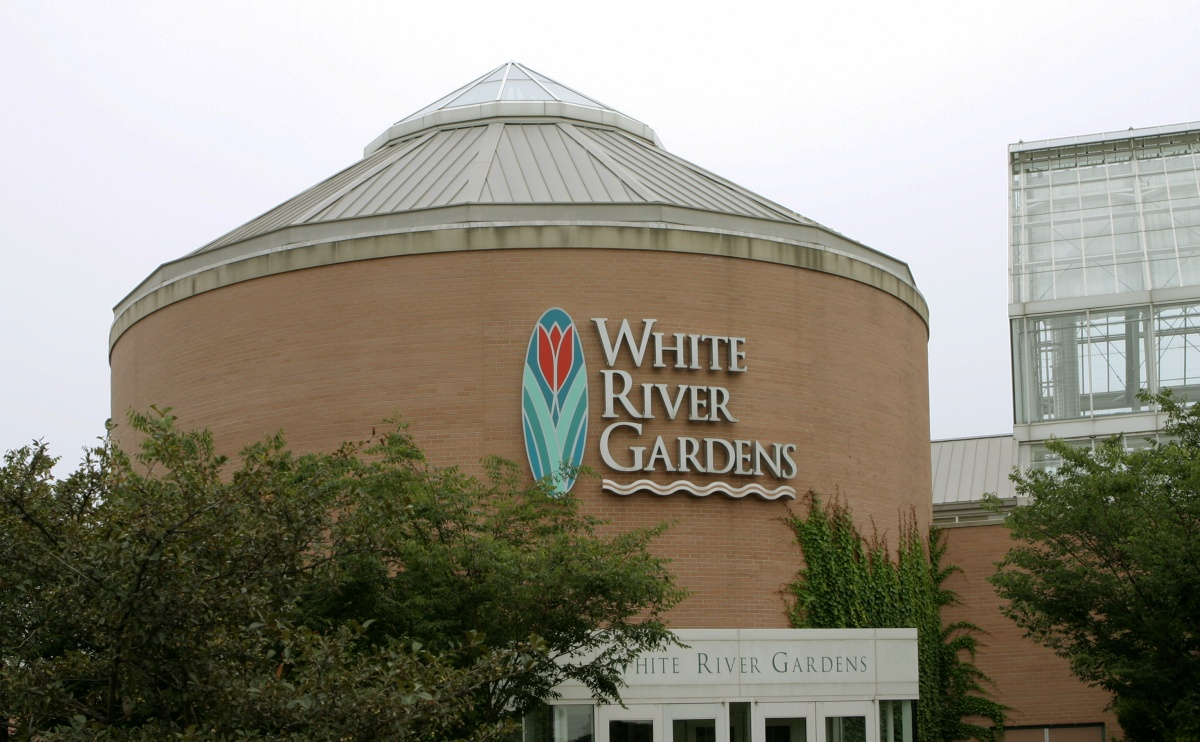
- White River Gardens in 2007
- Type: Botanical garden
- Location: White River State Park; Indianapolis, Indiana, U.S.
- Coordinates: 39.766°N 86.176°W
- Area: 3.3 acres (1.3 ha)
- Opened: June 13, 1999; 27 years ago
- Designer: Woollen, Molzan and Partners; Rundell Ernstberger Associates
- Owner: Indianapolis Zoological Society
- Operator: Indianapolis Zoo
- Open: Daily, seasonal hours vary
- Status: Open all year
- Paths: 1.5 miles (2.4 km)
- Plants: 47,233
- Species: 3,055
- Public transit: 8
- Cost: US$15 million
- Facilities: Hilbert Conservatory
- Website: Official website

White River Gardens is a botanical garden located at White River State Park in Indianapolis, Indiana, United States. Established in 1999, the gardens are managed and operated by the Indianapolis Zoo. In 2021, White River Gardens' 3.3 acres (1.3 ha) was home to nearly 50,000 plants of more than 3,000 species.

The complex includes a conservatory, fountains and water features, outdoor gardens, a dining and event facility, and 1.5 miles (2.4 km) of paths. The gardens are situated to the east of the zoo's entry plaza on the western bank of the White River overlooking downtown Indianapolis.

== History ==
White River Gardens, circa 1999

White River Gardens' beginnings date to the early-1990s as Indianapolis Zoo officials sought to bring more public attention to the interdependence of plant and animal habitats. The inaugural Bloomfest, hosted in the spring of 1992, was among the zoo's first efforts to heighten awareness. Hired as the zoo's new president and chief executive officer in January 1993, Jeffrey Bonner envisioned several additions to the zoo, including a botanical garden.

In October 1996, the Indianapolis Zoo received accreditation as a botanical garden from the American Association of Museums. Plans for White River Gardens were announced in December 1996 with a $5 million gift from the Lilly Endowment. In April 1997, Stephen and Tomisue Hilbert pledged $3 million to support construction.

In October 1997, the Indianapolis Zoological Society oversaw the groundbreaking of White River Gardens on the site of a surface parking lot. The project was the first major expansion since the opening of the Indianapolis Zoo at White River State Park in 1988. The $15 million design borrowed inspiration from Indiana's agricultural landscape.

White River Gardens opened to the public on June 13, 1999.

Originally opened as a standalone attraction, admission and membership to the gardens were maintained separately from the neighboring Indianapolis Zoo. However, in 2007, the zoo introduced a streamlined fee structure that incorporated White River Gardens into the zoo's single-visit admission and annual membership rates. The gardens' Dick Crum Resource Center closed in 2010.

Since September 2021, White River Gardens has been closed to allow for the construction of a new entry plaza to the zoo and gardens, scheduled for completion in spring 2023.

== Features ==
=== Hilbert Conservatory ===
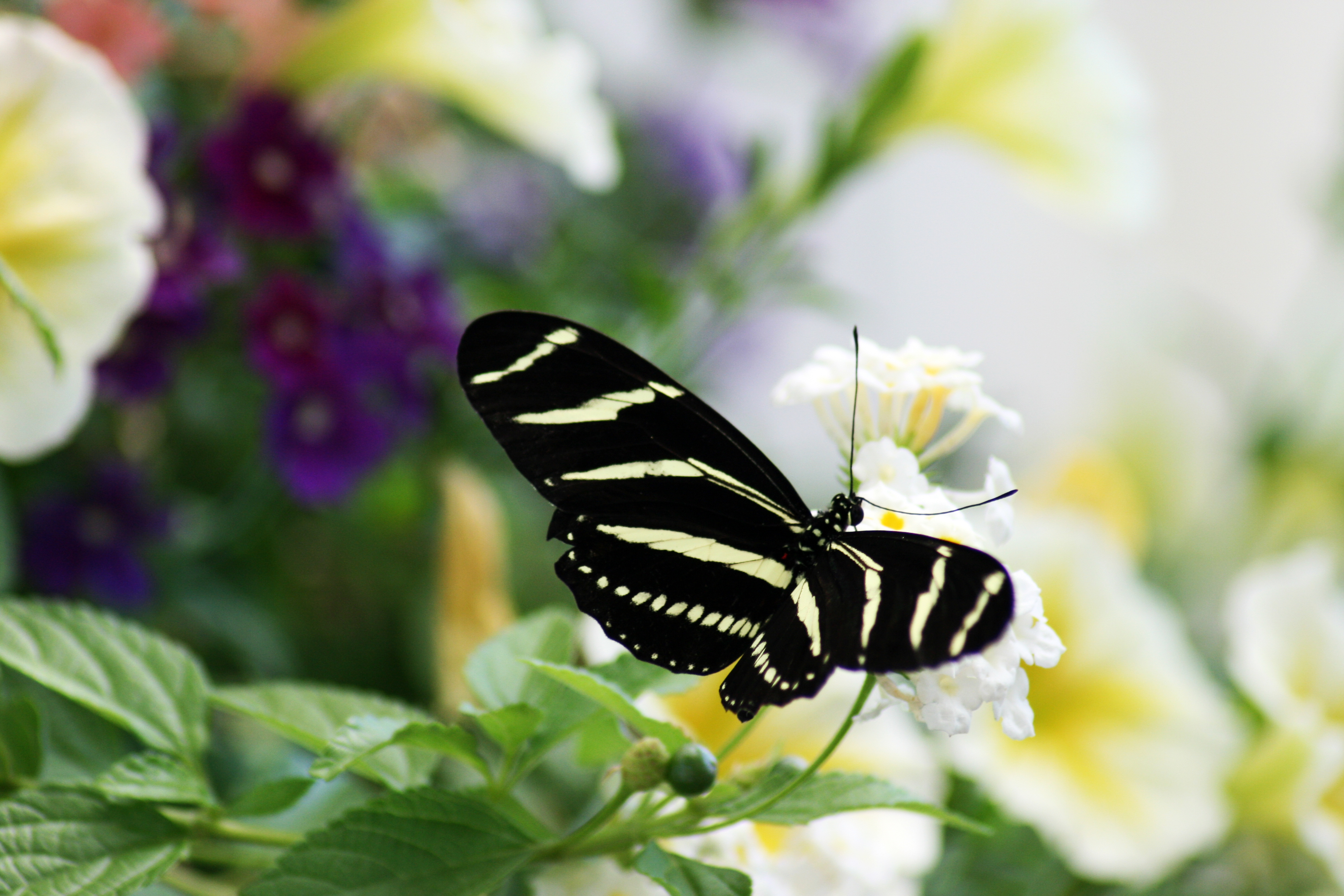
"Butterfly Kaleidoscope" at Hilbert Conservatory in 2009

Hilbert Conservatory was designed by Indianapolis architectural firm Woollen, Molzan and Partners. The glass-enclosed conservatory contains a 65-foot (20 m) ceiling and totals 5,000 square feet (460 m^{2}) in size.

Hilbert Conservatory hosts "Butterfly Kaleidoscope," an annual exhibit that features over 13,000 butterflies from over 40 different species found throughout the world.

=== Outdoor gardens ===
One of the missions of the garden is to provide inspiration and ideas to gardeners on how to design their own gardens through design and traditional methods. Indianapolis-based Rundell Ernstberger Associates served as the landscape architect for the project, designing the outdoor gardens.

The Christel DeHaan Family Foundation Tiergarten contains nine themed gardens:

- Allen W. Clowes Water Garden – water garden
- Dan and Lori Efroymson Wedding Garden – garden room
- Indianapolis Garden Club Heritage Garden
- Indianapolis Zoological Guild Hedge Garden
- Knot Garden – knot garden
- Ornamental Allée
- Polly Horton Hix Design Garden
- Shade Garden – shade garden
- Sun Garden

=== Public art ===
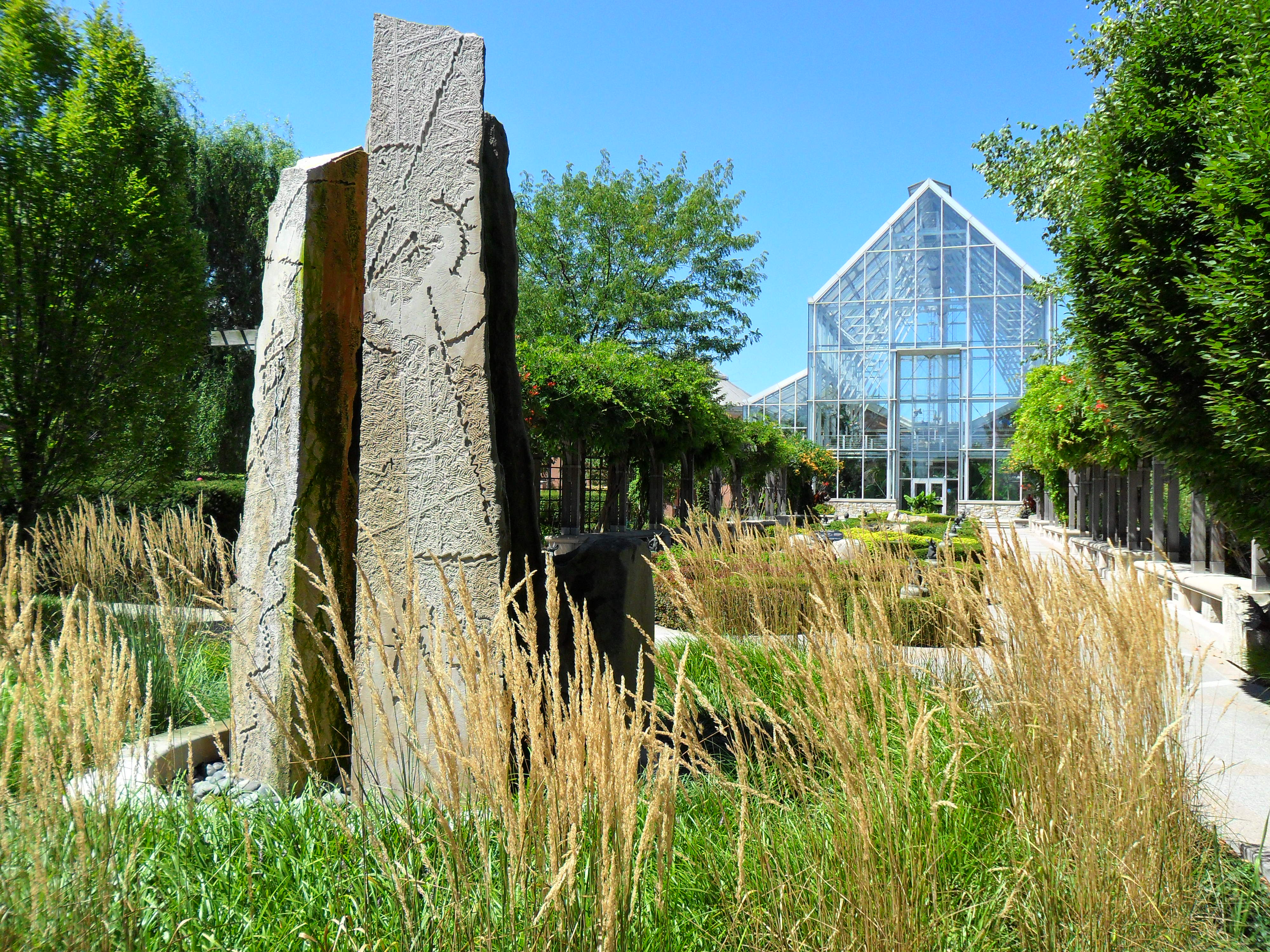
Dale Enochs' Earth Stone in the DeHaan Tiergarten

Several pieces of art were commissioned as part of White River Gardens. Andrew Reid's Midwestern Panorama, a cylindrical 3,000-square-foot (280 m^{2}) mural located inside the Bud Schaefer Rotunda, depicts native Indiana flora and fauna cycling through the four seasons.

Glass artist Dave McLary's Capital Campaign Donors Recognition Window consists of four 22-foot (6.7 m)-by-6-foot (1.8 m) panels etched with springtime scenes emblematic of Indiana.

Dale Enochs contributed several pieces, including seven water tables, 40 sculptural stones, and 100 individual limestone bricks. Enochs' Earth Stone, a 12-foot (3.7 m)-tall limestone sculpture, serves as a focal point in the outdoor gardens.

Sculptor Jan Martin produced 49 bronze anthropomorphic animals "to bring humor and whimsy to the Gardens". Martin also fabricated four 24-foot (7.3 m)-tall trellises and five 14-foot (4.3 m)-tall vining leaf sculptures of stainless steel.

Amy Brier's interactive Spring, Summer, Fall, and Winter are four individual limestone spheres situated in urns of sand atop pedestals. Each sphere's carvings depict native flora corresponding to its season.

== See also ==
- List of botanical gardens and arboretums in Indiana
- List of attractions and events in Indianapolis
- List of parks in Indianapolis
