= Minton–Capehart Federal Building =

Historic government building in Indianapolis, Indiana, U.S.

- Minton–Capehart Federal Building in 2019

General information
- Status: Completed
- Type: Government offices
- Architectural style: Brutalism
- Location: 575 N. Pennsylvania St., Indianapolis, Indiana, U.S.
- Coordinates: 39°46′29″N 86°9′19″W
- Construction started: November 6, 1972; 54 years ago
- Opening: 1975
- Cost: US$20 million ($145 million in 2025 dollars)

Technical details
- Floor count: 6
- Floor area: 406,872 sq ft (37,799.6 m^{2})

Design and construction
- Architect: Woollen, Molzan and Partners
- Developer: U.S. General Services Administration

The Minton–Capehart Federal Building is a United States federal building in Indianapolis, Indiana, United States, that is named in honor of former U.S. Senator and U.S. Supreme Court Justice Sherman Minton and former U.S. Senator Homer E. Capehart.

The building was designed by Indianapolis architect Evans Woollen III, the principal and founder of Woollen, Molzan and Partners. Completed in 1975, the structure is notable for its exposed concrete slabs, which are typical of the Brutalist architecture style. Some have called the $20 million project a "pigeon coop" and "the ugliest building in Indianapolis." Boston City Hall, completed in 1968, is similar in design and may have served as inspiration for Woollen.

Built to fill in the east side of the Indiana World War Memorial Plaza, the block-long, six-story structure is raised 24 feet (7.3 m) above grade on large columns. The concrete building includes 290,000 square feet (27,000 m^{2}) of flexible office on five floors and a parking garage level for 500 cars. Its distinctive, horizontal façade tilts outward as the square footage of each upper floor increases, forming an inverted ziggurat.

Graphic designer Milton Glaser, designer of the stylized I Love New York heart logo, designed the building's graphic rainbow mural, Color Fuses, another notable feature of the building. The colorful mural wraps around the exterior's base. Many local residents disliked the colorful mural, which has faded over time, as well as the building's stark design, but architects have considered it one of the city's few "cutting-edge designs from the 1970s."

The building was listed on the National Register of Historic Places in 2021.

== See also ==
- National Register of Historic Places listings in Center Township, Marion County, Indiana
