= Majestic Building (Indianapolis, Indiana) =

- U.S. National Register of Historic Places
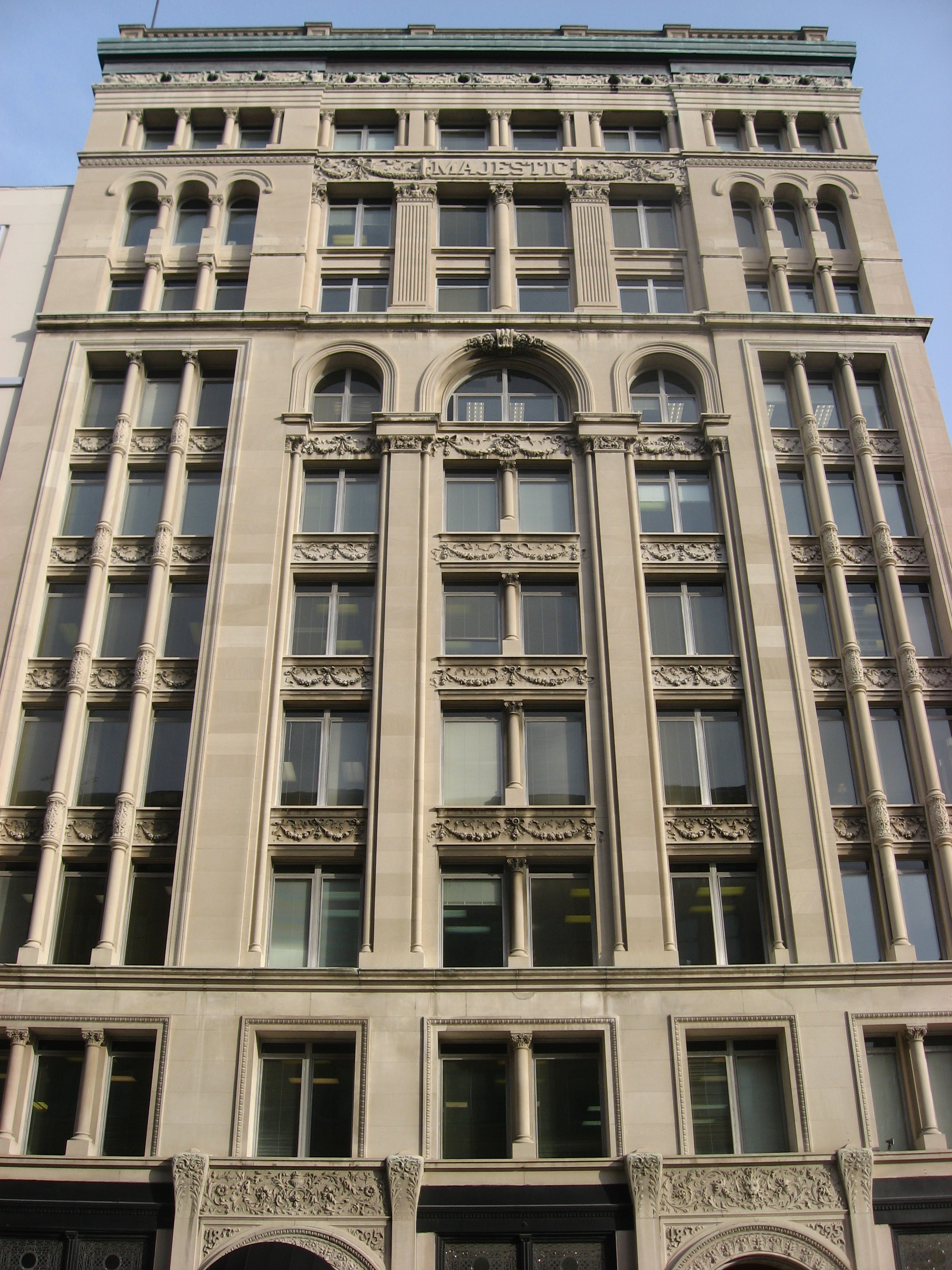
- Majestic Building, January 2010

- Location within Indianapolis Location within Indianapolis Location within Indiana Location within the United States
- Location: 47 S. Pennsylvania St., Indianapolis, Indiana
- Coordinates: 39°45′56″N 86°9′22″W
- Area: less than one acre
- Built: 1895-1896
- Built by: Jungclaus, William
- Architect: Bohlen, D. A. & Son
- NRHP reference No.: 80000059
- Added to NRHP: November 20, 1980

Majestic Building, also known as the Indiana Farm Bureau Co-op Building, is a historic commercial building located at Indianapolis, Indiana. It was built in 1895–1896, and is a large ten-story, U-shaped, brick and limestone building. It features semi-circular and voussoir arched openings.

Citizens Gas & Coke Utility leased four floors for its headquarters until 1956.

It was listed on the National Register of Historic Places in 1980.

== See also ==
- National Register of Historic Places listings in Center Township, Marion County, Indiana
