= Indiana Theatre (Indianapolis) =

Historic theater in Indianapolis, Indiana, US

- U.S. National Register of Historic Places
- U.S. Historic district – Contributing property
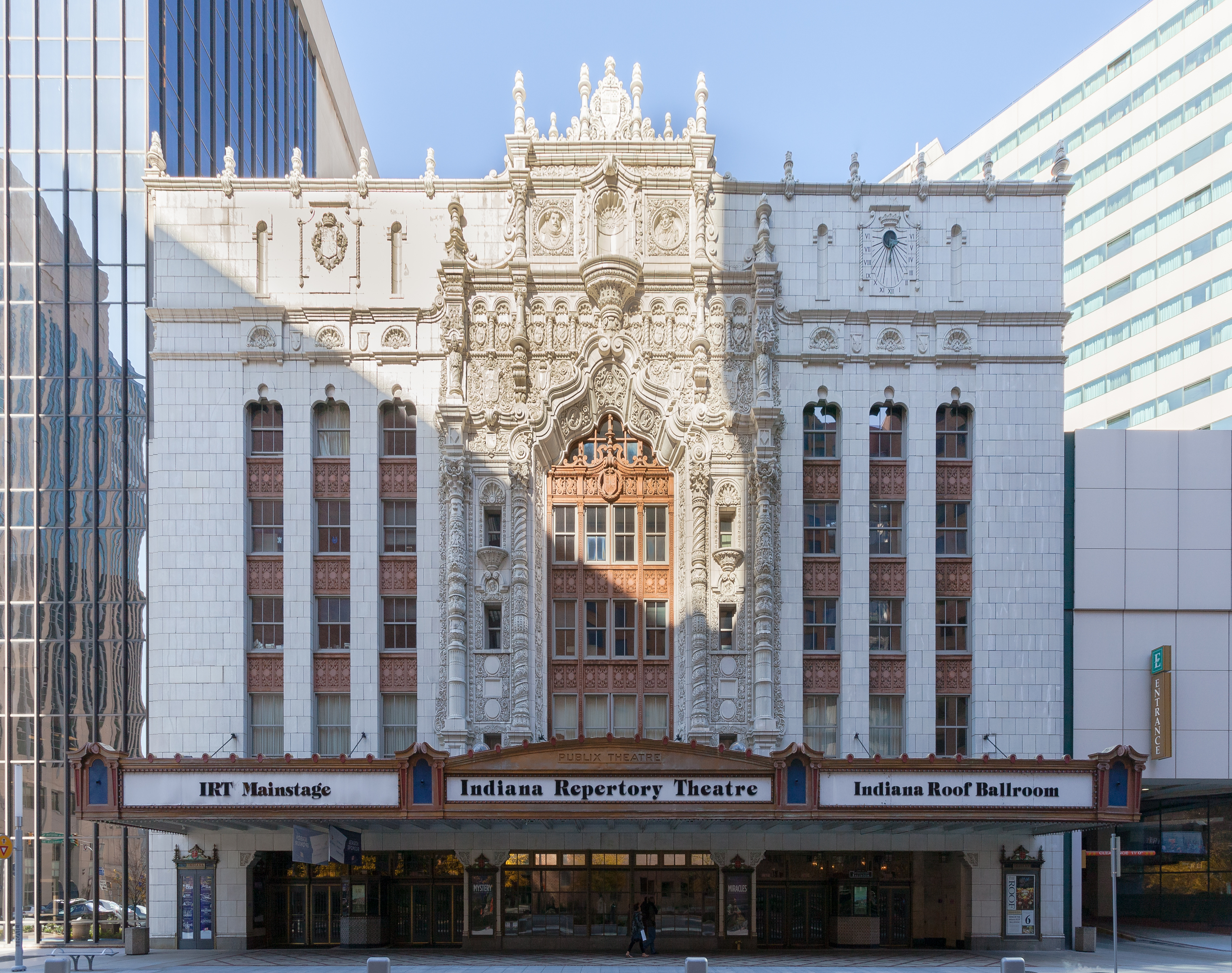
- Indiana Theatre in 2012

- Location within Indiana Location within the United States
- Location: 140 W. Washington St., Indianapolis, Indiana, U.S.
- Coordinates: 39°46′2″N 86°9′39″W
- Area: 1 acre (0.40 ha)
- Built: 1927
- Architects: Rubush and Hunter; William P. Jungclaus Company, Inc.
- Architectural style: Spanish Baroque
- NRHP reference No.: 79000035
- Added to NRHP: January 29, 1979

The Indiana Theatre is a multiple use performing arts venue located at 140 W. Washington Street in Indianapolis, Indiana, United States. It was built as a movie palace and ballroom in 1927 and today is the home of the Indiana Repertory Theatre. It was added to the U.S. National Register of Historic Places in 1979. It is located in the Washington Street-Monument Circle Historic District.

== Description ==
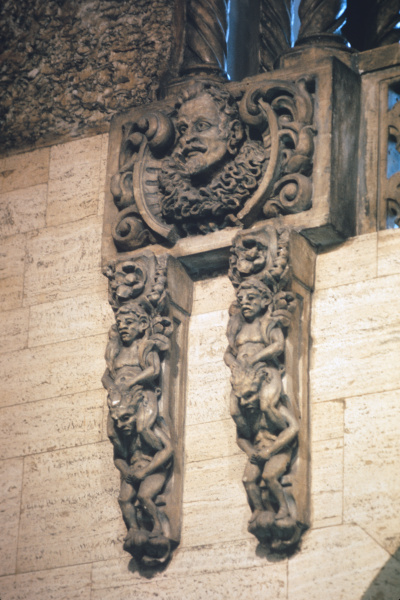
Indiana Theatre Detail

The building is six stories and is of concrete frame construction. The front of the building is sheathed in white terra cotta. The main feature of the facade is the curving triangular arch with churrigueresque framing that fills the central bay above the marquee. The original marquee is still in place. The basement originally contained bowling alleys and billiard rooms. Upper floors were divided between office space and theater space. The interior included an entrance lobby, 2 1/2-story main lobby and a 3,200-seat auditorium. The auditorium was distinguished by elaborate plaster ornamentation based on Spanish Baroque motifs. The building is topped by the Indiana Roof Ballroom, a large atmospheric ballroom decorated to resemble a square surrounded by buildings with a stage at one end. The ballroom has an elliptical dome with sky effects. The theater is a major example of the American motion picture palace. The building was restored and the auditorium was extensively remodeled in 1979–80 to accommodate the needs of the Indiana Repertory Theatre.

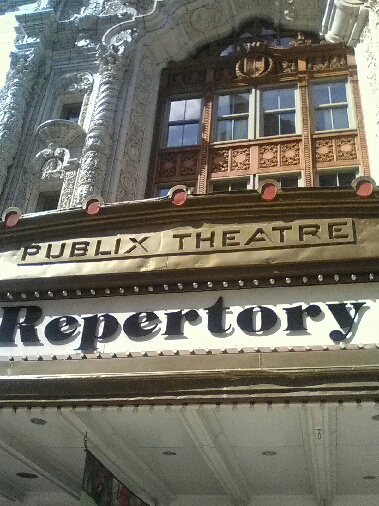
Detail of Publix Theatre logo

== See also ==
- List of attractions and events in Indianapolis
- National Register of Historic Places listings in Center Township, Marion County, Indiana
