= Chinese guardian lions =

Chinese statues of lion-like creatures

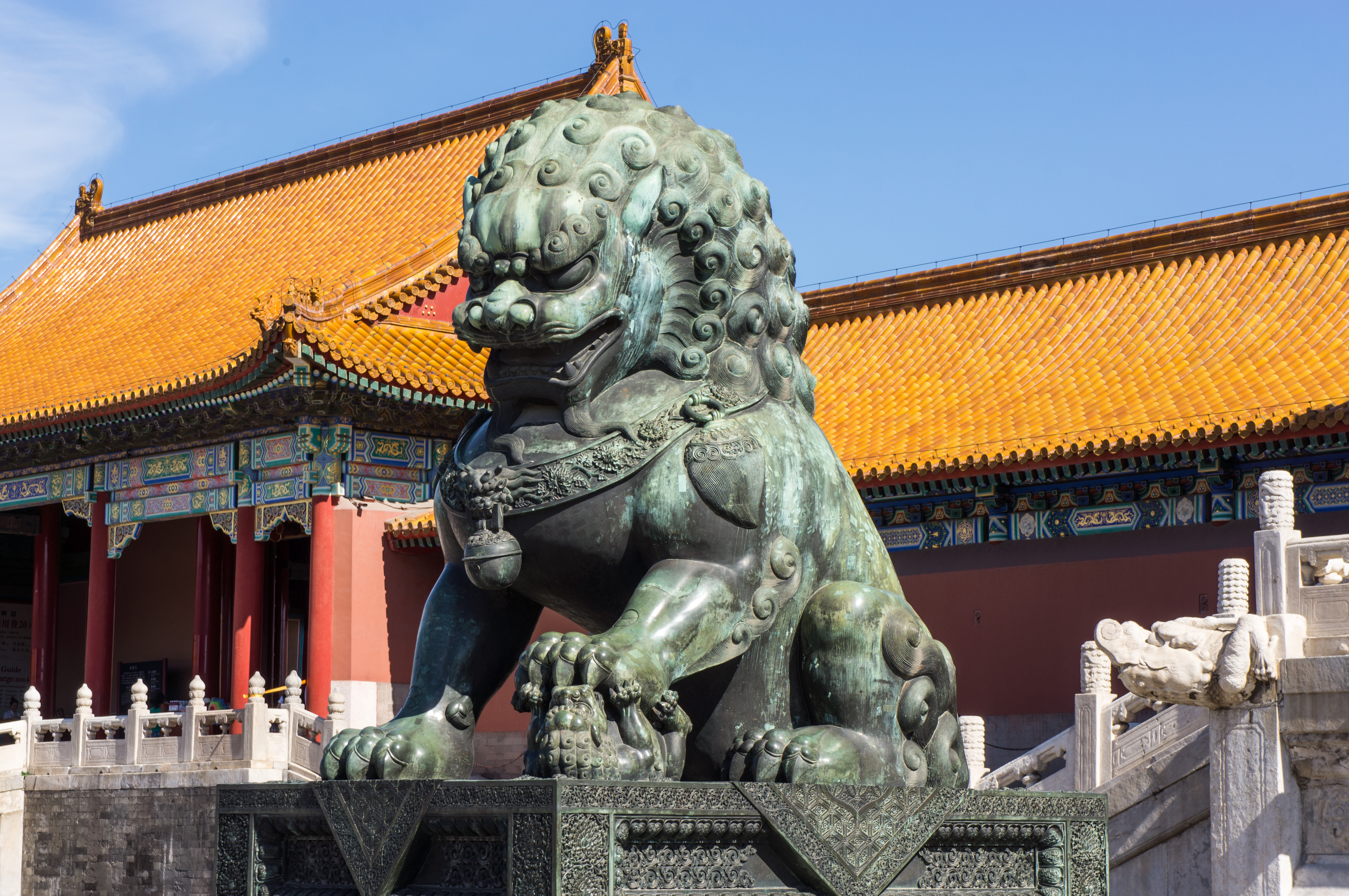
- A guardian lion in the Forbidden City

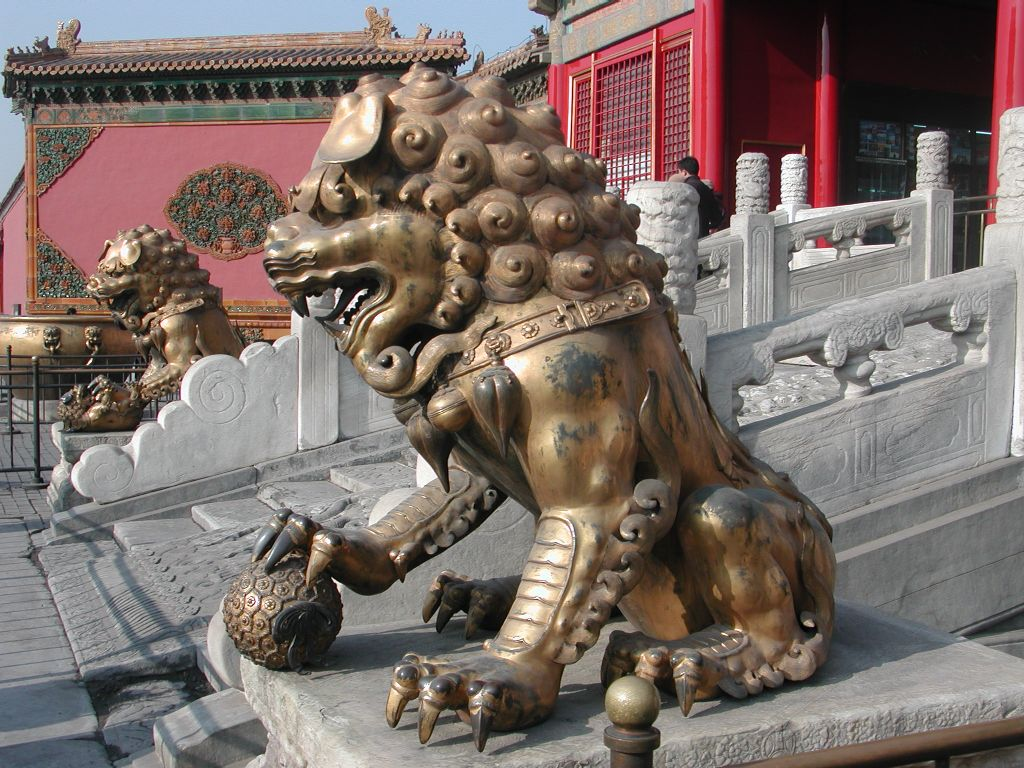
- A guardian lion pair in the Forbidden City. Note the different appearance of the face and details in the decorative items, compared to the earlier Ming version.

Chinese name
- Traditional Chinese: 獅(子)
- Simplified Chinese: 狮(子)
- Literal meaning: lion
Transcriptions
Standard Mandarin
- Hanyu Pinyin: shī(zi)
- Wade–Giles: shi(-tzu)

Alternative Chinese name
- Traditional Chinese: 石獅(子)
- Simplified Chinese: 石狮(子)
- Literal meaning: stone lion
Transcriptions
Standard Mandarin
- Hanyu Pinyin: shíshī(zi)
- Bopomofo: ㄕˊ ㄕ (ㄗ˙)
- Wade–Giles: shih^{2}-shih^{1}(-tzu)

Khmer name
- Khmer: សឹង្ហ singha

Tamil name
- Tamil: சிங்கம் singham

Thai name
- Thai: สิงห์ sǐng

Sinhala name
- Sinhala: සිංහ siṁha

Sanskrit name
- Sanskrit: सिंहः sinha

Burmese name
- Burmese: ခြင်္သေ့ chinthe

Tibetan name
- Tibetan: གངས་སེང་གེ gangs-seng-ge

Chinese guardian lions, or imperial guardian lions, are a traditional Chinese architectural ornament. Typically made of stone, they are also known as stone lions or shishi (石獅; shíshī). They are known in colloquial English as lion dogs, foo dogs, or fu dogs. The concept, which originated and became popular in Chinese Buddhism, features a pair of Asiatic lions — often one male with a ball that represents the material elements and one female with a cub that represents the element of spirit — that were thought to protect the building from harmful spiritual influences and harmful people that might be a threat. Used in imperial Chinese palaces and tombs, the lions subsequently spread to other parts of Asia including Japan (see komainu), Okinawa, Korea, Mongolia, the Philippines, Tibet, Thailand, Myanmar, Vietnam, Sri Lanka, India, Nepal, Cambodia, Laos, Singapore, and Malaysia.

== Description ==
Statues of guardian lions have traditionally stood in front of Chinese Imperial palaces, Imperial tombs, government offices, temples, and the homes of government officials and the wealthy, and were believed to have powerful mythic protective benefits. They are also used in other artistic contexts, for example on door-knockers, and in pottery. Pairs of guardian lion statues are still common and symbolic elements at the entrances to restaurants, hotels, supermarkets and other structures, with one sitting on each side of the entrance, in China and in other places around the world where the Chinese people have immigrated and settled, especially in local Chinatowns.

The lions are usually depicted in pairs. When used as statuary, the pair would consist of a male leaning his paw upon an embroidered ball (in imperial contexts, representing supremacy over the world) and a female restraining a playful cub that is on its back (representing nurture).

== Etymology ==
Guardian lions are referred to in various ways depending on language and context. In Chinese, they are traditionally called simply shi (Chinese: 獅; pinyin: shī) meaning lion—the word shi itself is thought to be derived from the Persian word šer. Lions were first presented to the Han court by emissaries from Central Asia and Persia, and were already popularly depicted as guardian figures by the sixth century AD. Today, the guardian lions are more usually specified by reference to the medium or material, for example:

- Stone lion (石獅; Shíshī): for a stone sculpture; or
- Bronze lion (銅獅; Tóngshī): for a bronze sculpture.

and less commonly:

- Auspicious lion (瑞獅; Ruìshī): referring to the Tibetan Snow Lion or good fortune.

=== In other Asian cultures ===
- In Cambodia: known as Singha or Sing (សឹង្ហ)
- In India: known as Sher, Singha (शेर, সিংহ)
- In Nepal: known as Singha (सिंह, সিংহ)
- In Japan: the lion figures are known as Shishi (獅子, lion) or Komainu (狛犬, Korean dog)
- In Korea: known as Sanye (狻猊)
- In Myanmar and Laos: known as Chinthe, the namesake of the World War II Chindit soldiers
- In Okinawa: known as Shisa
- In Sri Lanka: known as Singha (සිංහ මූර්ති), or Singham (சிங்கம்)
- In Thailand: known as Singha or s̄ingh̄̒ (สิงห์)
- In Tibet: known as a Snow Lion or Gangs-seng-ge (གངས་སེང་གེ་)
- In Vietnam: known as Sư tử đá

=== Western names ===
In English and several Western languages, the guardian lions have often been referred by a multitude of names such as: "Fu Dogs", "Foo Dogs", "Fu Lions", "Fo Lions", and "Lion Dogs". The term "Fo" or "Fu" may be transliterations of 佛 (pinyin: fó) 'Buddha' or 福 (pinyin: fú) 'prosperity'. However, Chinese references to guardian lions are seldom prefixed with these words and are never referred to as "dogs".

Reference to guardian lions as dogs in Western cultures may be due to the Japanese reference to them as "Korean dogs" (狛犬・高麗犬) due to their transmission from China through Korea into Japan. It may also be due to the misidentification of the guardian lion figures as representing certain Chinese dog breeds such as the Chow Chow (鬆獅犬; sōngshī quǎn; 'puffy-lion dog') or Pekingese (獅子狗; Shīzi Gǒu; 'lion dog').

== Appearance ==
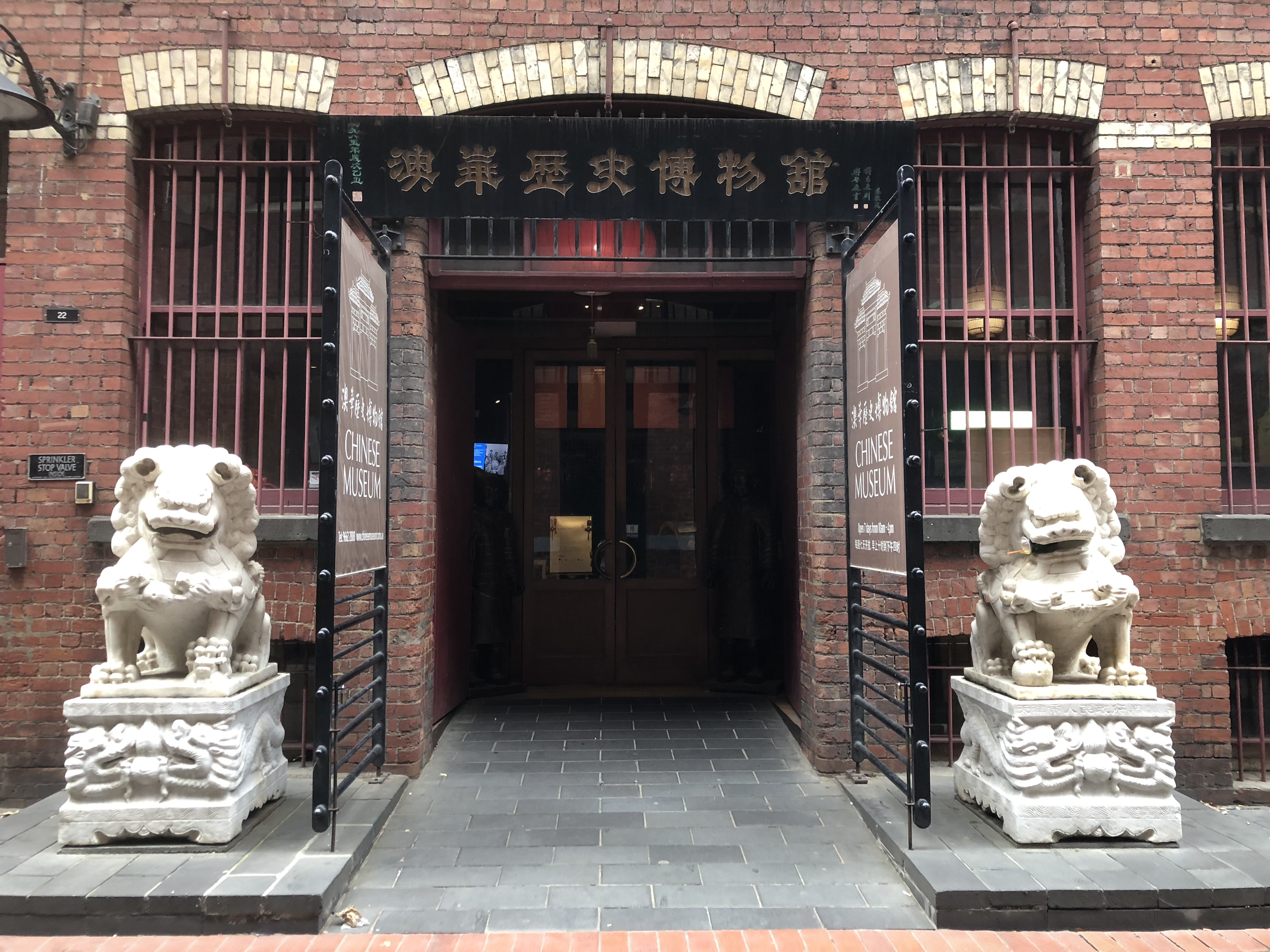
Guardian lions outside the Chinese Museum in Melbourne. In accordance with feng shui, the male lion, with the ball under his right paw, is on the right, and the female, with the cub under her left paw, is on the left.

The lions are traditionally carved from decorative stone, such as marble or granite, or cast in bronze or iron. Because of the high cost of these materials and the labor required to produce them, private use of guardian lions was traditionally reserved for wealthy or elite families. Indeed, a traditional symbol of a family's wealth or social status was the placement of guardian lions in front of the family home. However, in modern times less expensive lions, mass-produced in concrete and resin, have become available and their use is therefore no longer restricted to the elite.

The lions are always presented in pairs, a manifestation of yin and yang, the female representing yin and the male yang. The male lion has his right front paw on a type of cloth ball simply called an "embroidered ball" (繡球; xiù qiú), which is sometimes carved with a geometric pattern. The female is essentially identical, but has a cub under the left paw, representing the cycle of life. Symbolically, the female lion protects those dwelling inside (the living soul within), while the male guards the structure (the external material elements). Sometimes the female has her mouth closed, and the male open. This symbolizes the enunciation of the sacred word "om". However, Japanese adaptations state that the male is inhaling, representing life, while the female exhales, representing death. Other styles have both lions with a single large pearl in each of their partially opened mouths. The pearl is carved so that it can roll about in the lion's mouth but sized just large enough so that it can never be removed.

According to feng shui, correct placement of the lions is important to ensure their beneficial effect. When looking at the entrance from outside the building, facing the lions, the male lion with the ball is on the right, and the female with the cub is on the left. For Hindu and Buddhist temples in South Asia, the Vastu Shastra (the South Asian equivalent to Feng Shui) advises lion guardian statues to be placed at the entrance of temples to protect the sacred space from negative entities. These can be most prominently found in the Indian states of Tamil Nadu, Odisha, West Bengal, and Manipur. Each region has its distinctive style which the Samaragana Sutradhara categorizes into four types. Temple lions are sometimes depicted with a foot placed on top of a crouching elephant, or occasionally with the head of an elephant (gajasimha).

Chinese lions are intended to reflect the emotion of the animal as opposed to the reality of the lion. This is in distinct opposition to the traditional English lion which is a lifelike depiction of the animal. The claws, teeth and eyes of the Chinese lion represent power. Few if any muscles are visible in the Chinese lion whereas the English lion shows its power through its life-like characteristics rather than through stylized representation.

== History ==
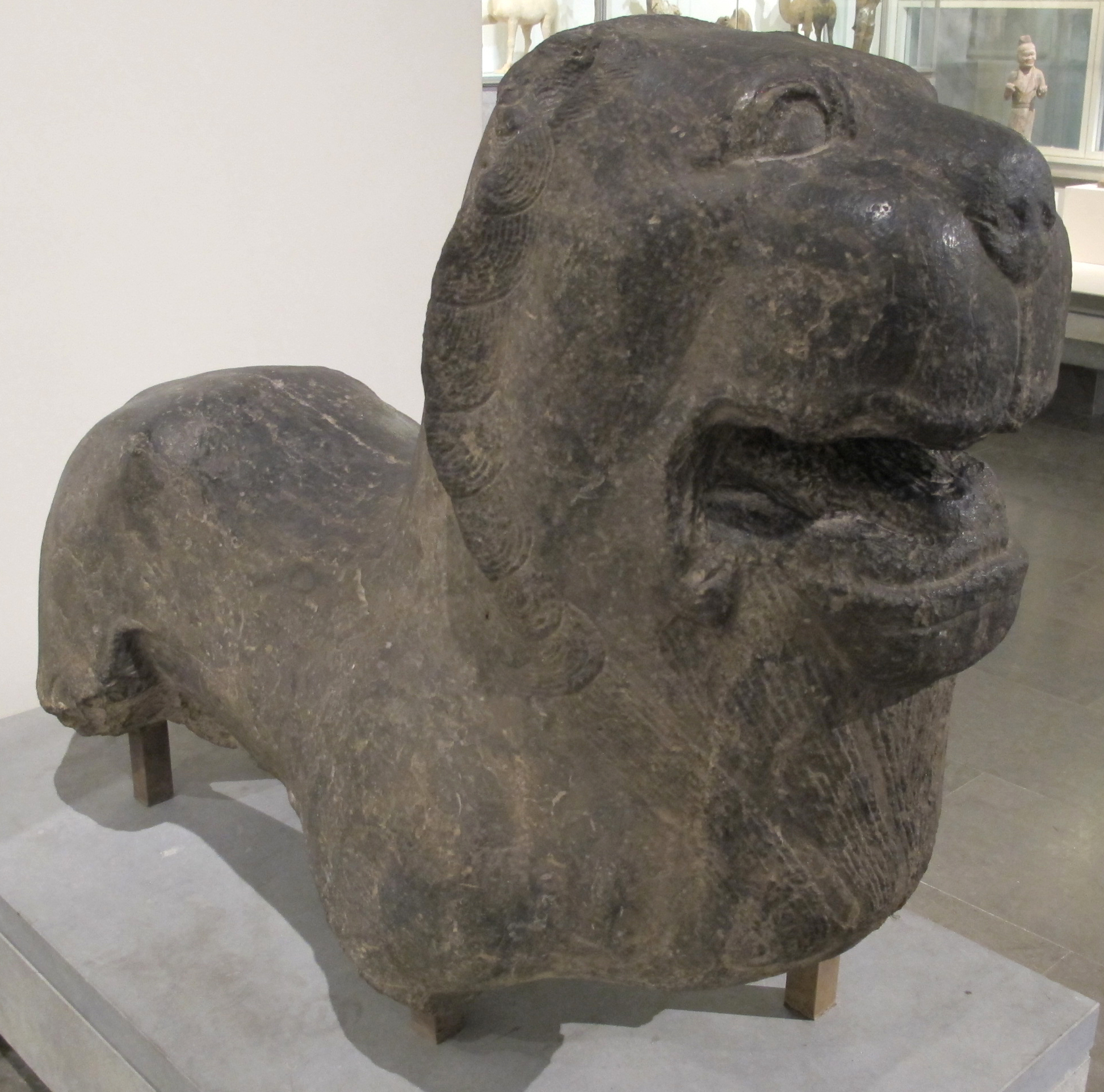
An example of Han dynasty stone-lion.

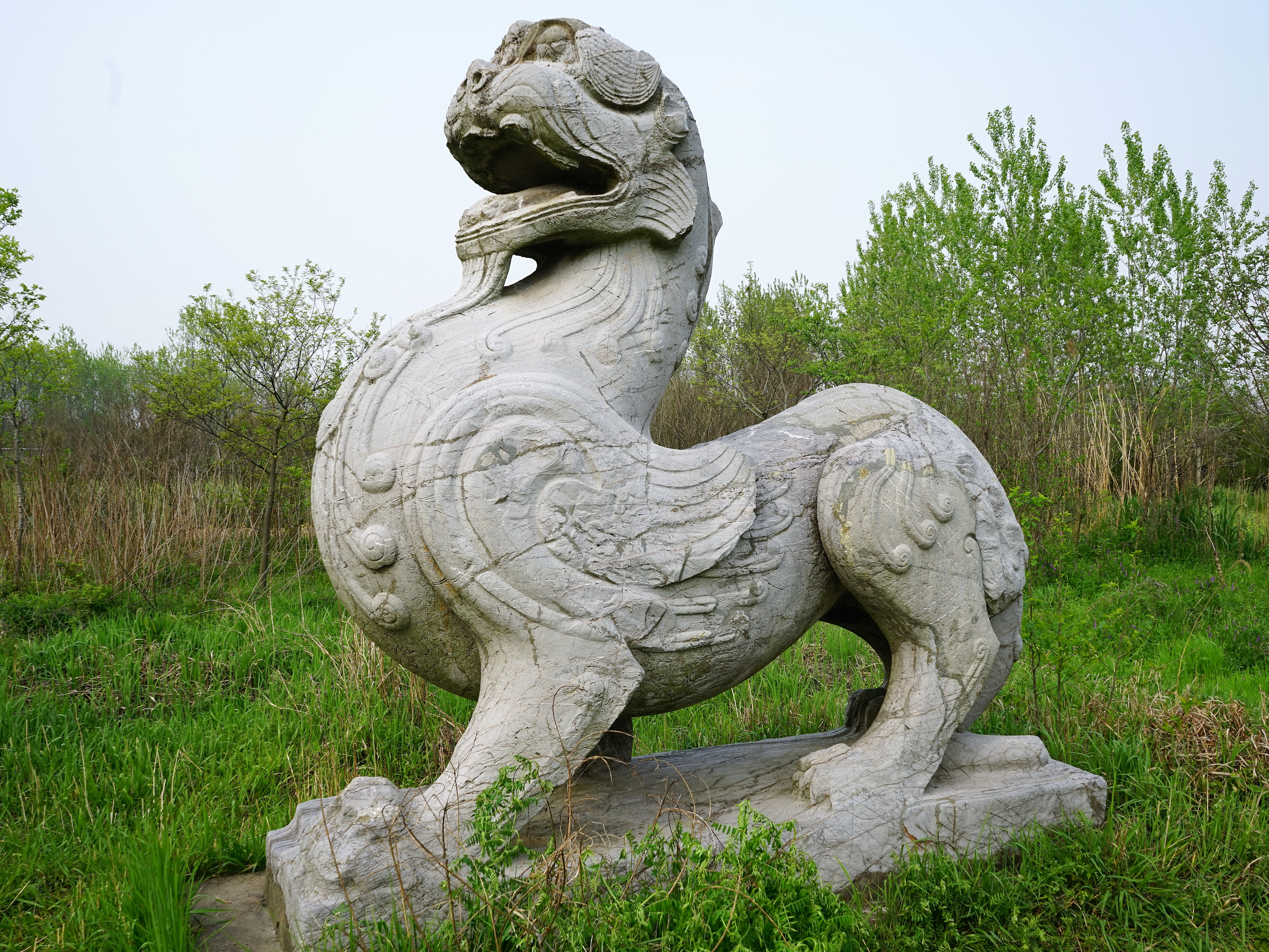
Northern Qi dynasty Pixiu statue, adorments similar to later stone-lions.

Asiatic lions are believed to be the ones depicted by the guardian lions in Chinese culture.

With increased trade during the Han dynasty and cultural exchanges through the Silk Road, lions were introduced into China from the ancient states of Central Asia by peoples of Sogdiana, Samarkand, and the Yuezhi (月氏) in the form of pelts and live tribute, along with stories about them from Buddhist priests and travelers of the time.

Several instances of lions as imperial tributes from Central Asia were recorded in the document Book of the Later Han (後漢書). On one particular event, on the eleventh lunar month of 87 CE, "... an envoy from Parthia offered as tribute a lion and an ostrich" to the Han court. Indeed, the lion was associated by the Han Chinese to earlier venerated creatures of the ancient Chinese, most notably by the monk Huilin (慧琳) who stated that "the mythic suan-ni (狻猊) is actually the lion, coming from the Western Regions" (狻猊即獅子也，出西域).

There are various styles of guardian lions reflecting influences from different time periods, imperial dynasties, and regions of China. These styles vary in their artistic detail and adornment as well as in the depiction of the lions from fierce to serene.

Although the form of the Chinese guardian lion was quite varied during its early history in China, the appearance, pose, and accessories of the lions eventually became standardized and formalized during the Ming and Qing dynasties into more or less its present form.

== Gallery ==
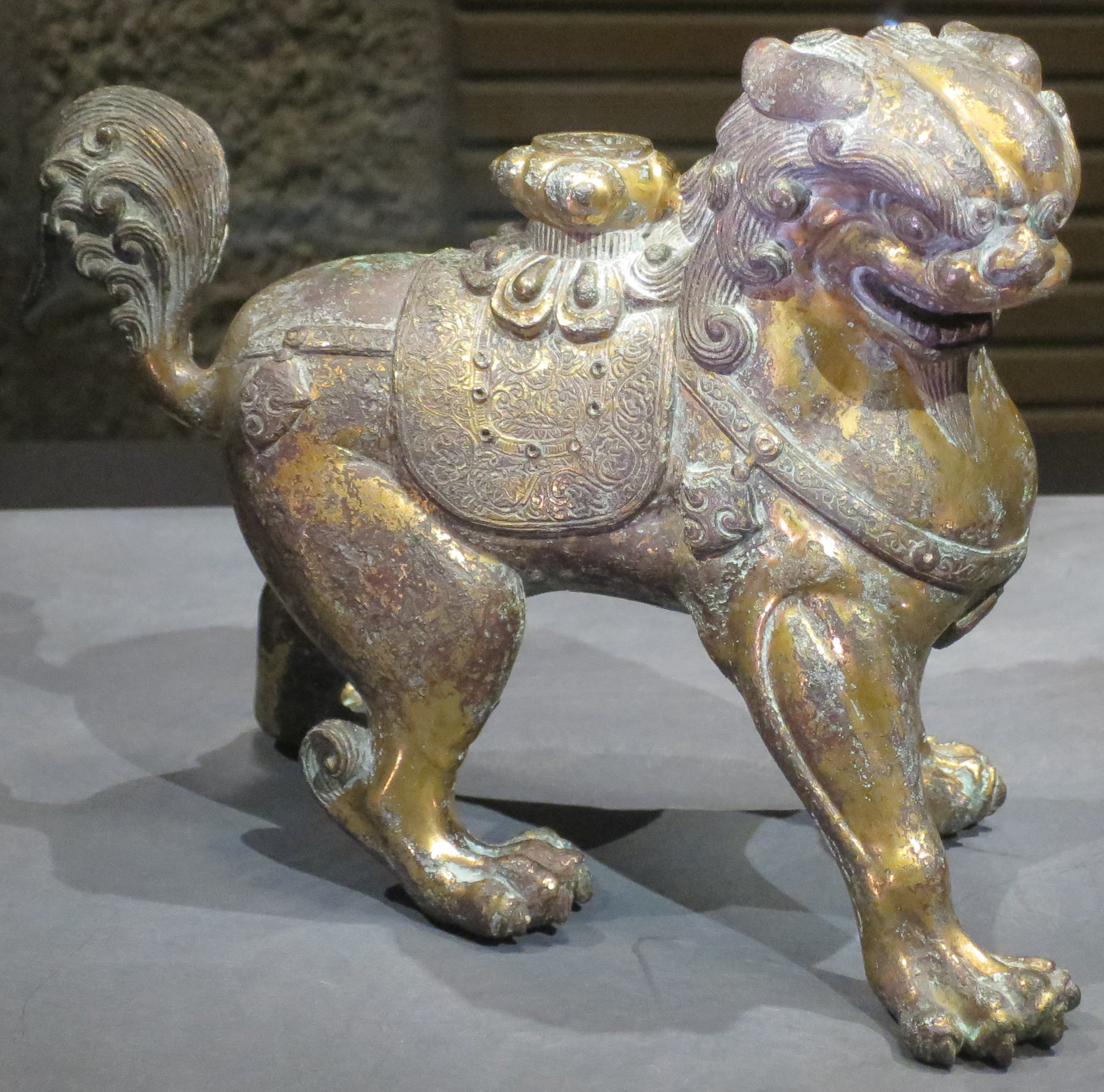
Bronze Chinese guardian lion

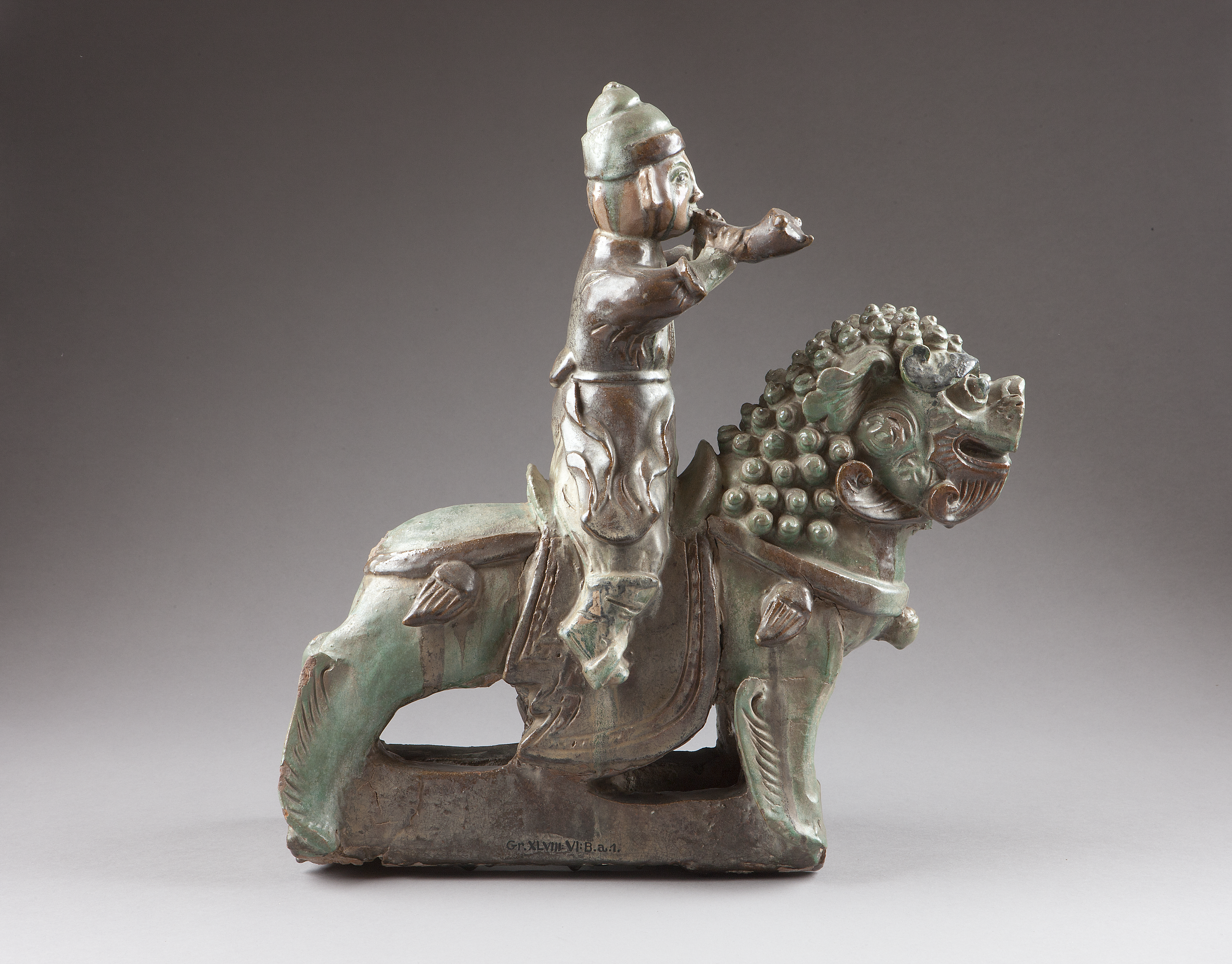
A horn blower riding a guardian lion, 17th century

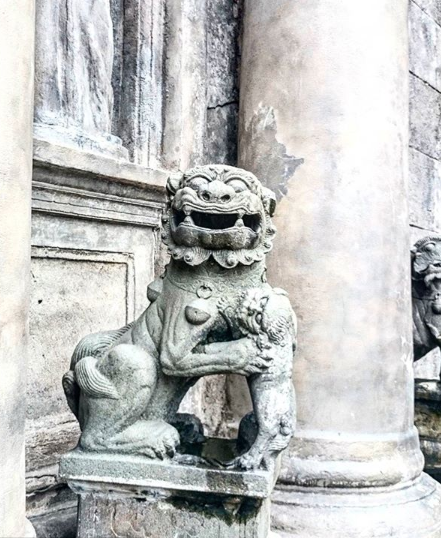
A female guardian lion, one of the many outside San Agustín Church (Manila) in the Philippines.

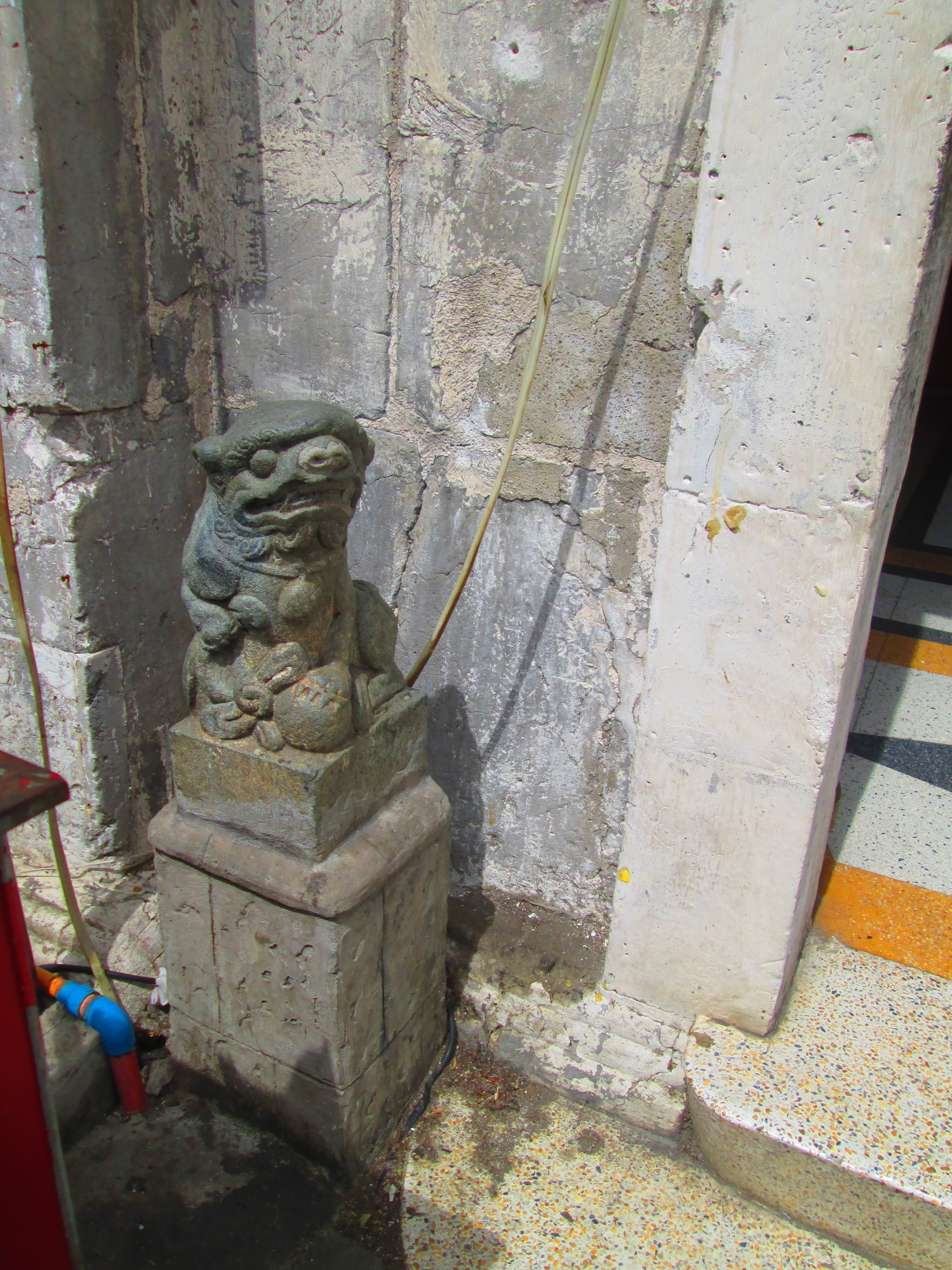
A guardian lion at Basilica del Santo Niño in Cebu, the Philippines. This pair are both male, similar to other churches in the islands.

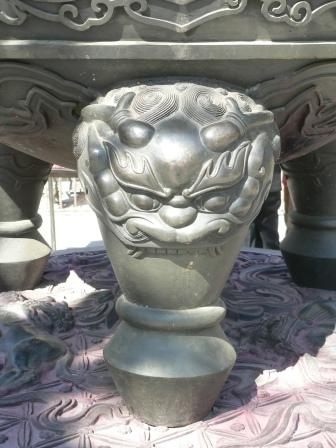
A lion-like suanni depicted on the leg of an incense burner

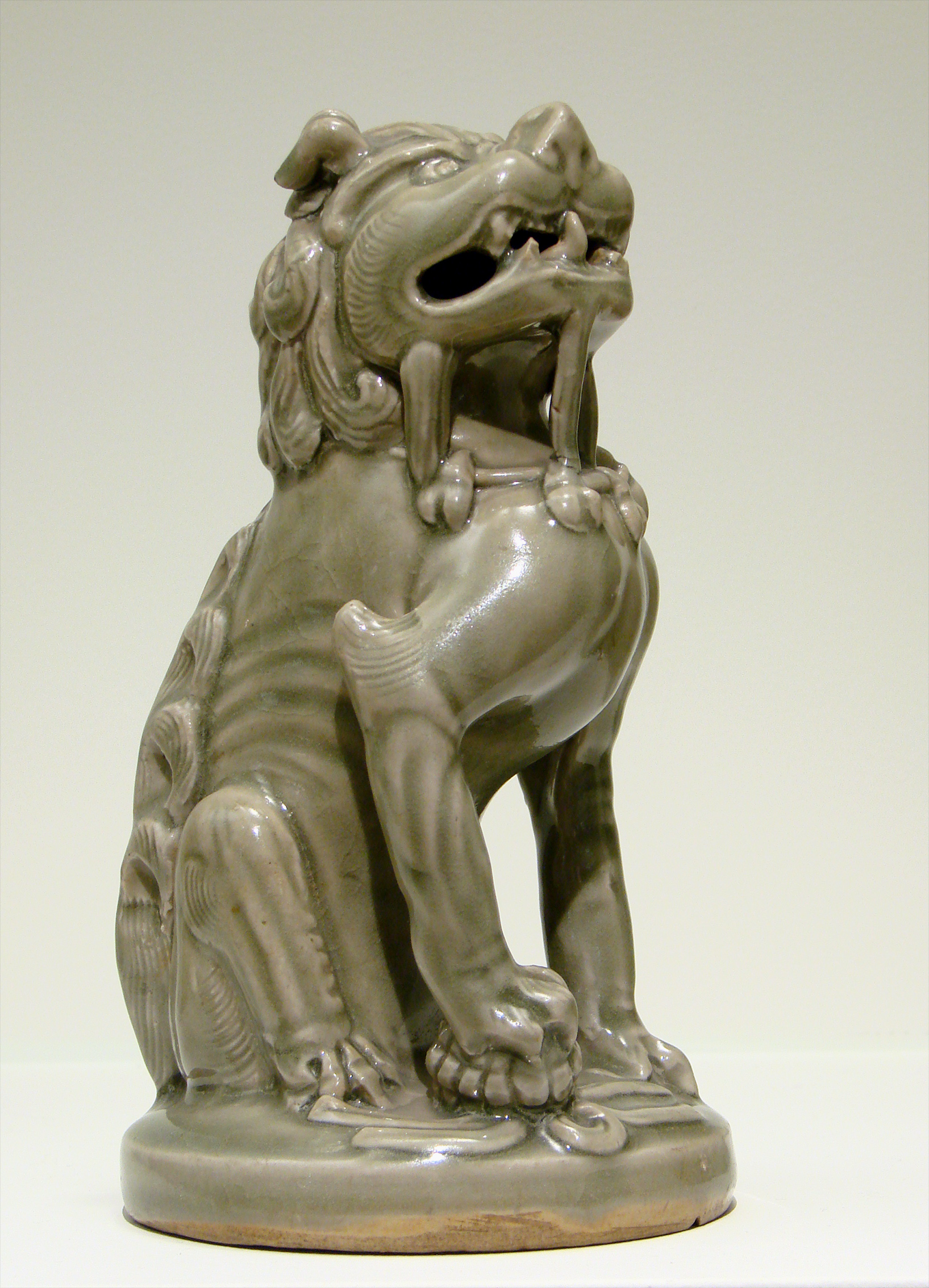
A sitting lion statue, celadon, 11th to 12th century

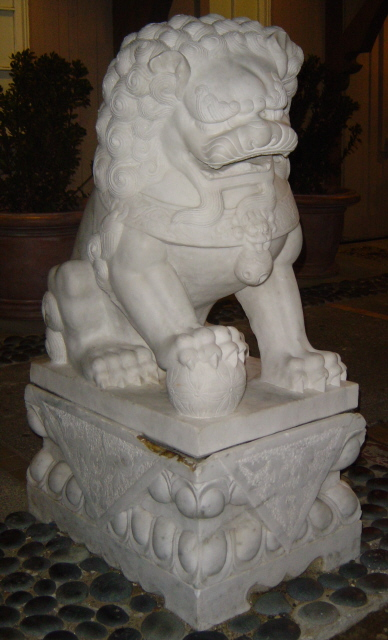
A white stone shi (male)

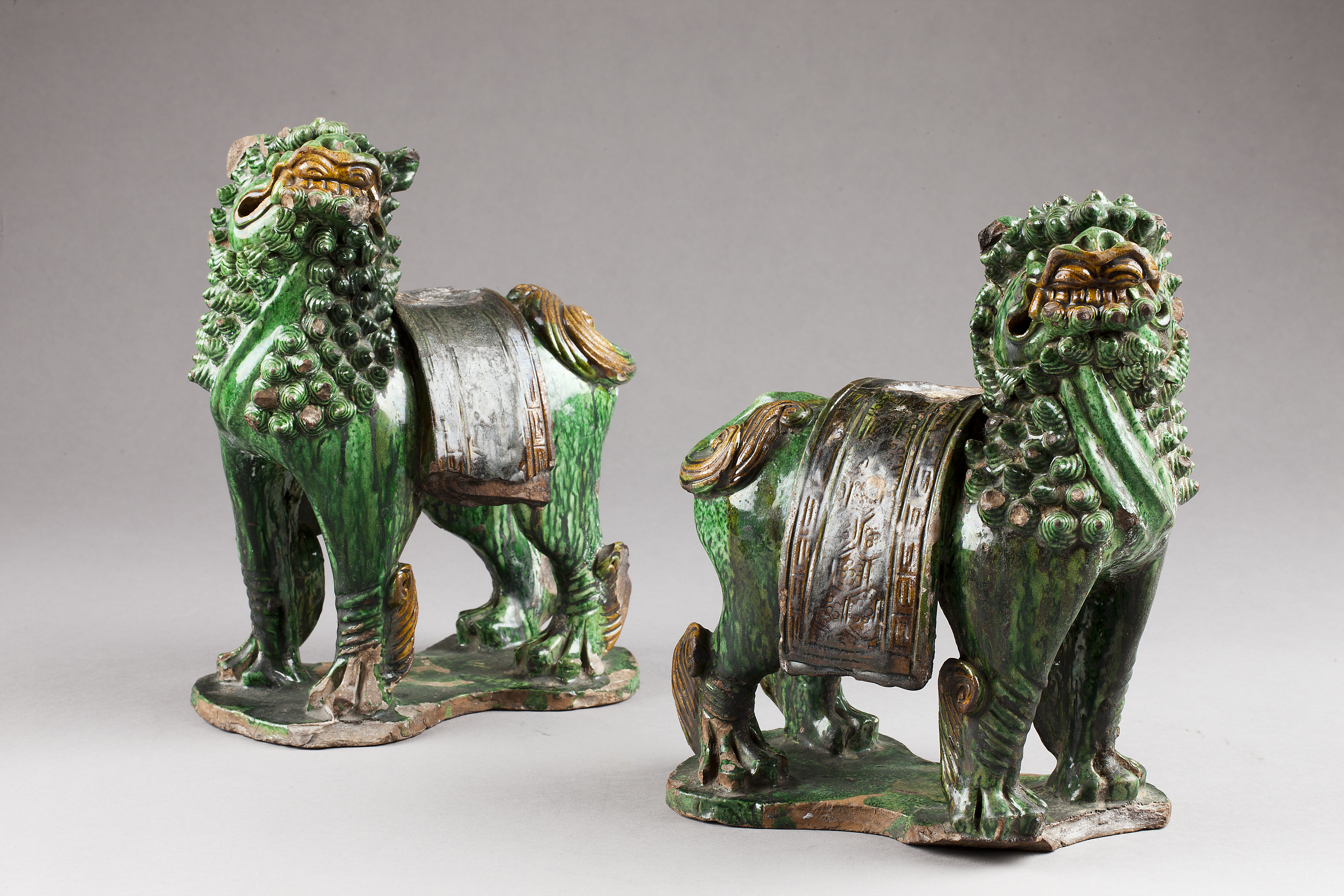
Green guardian lions,

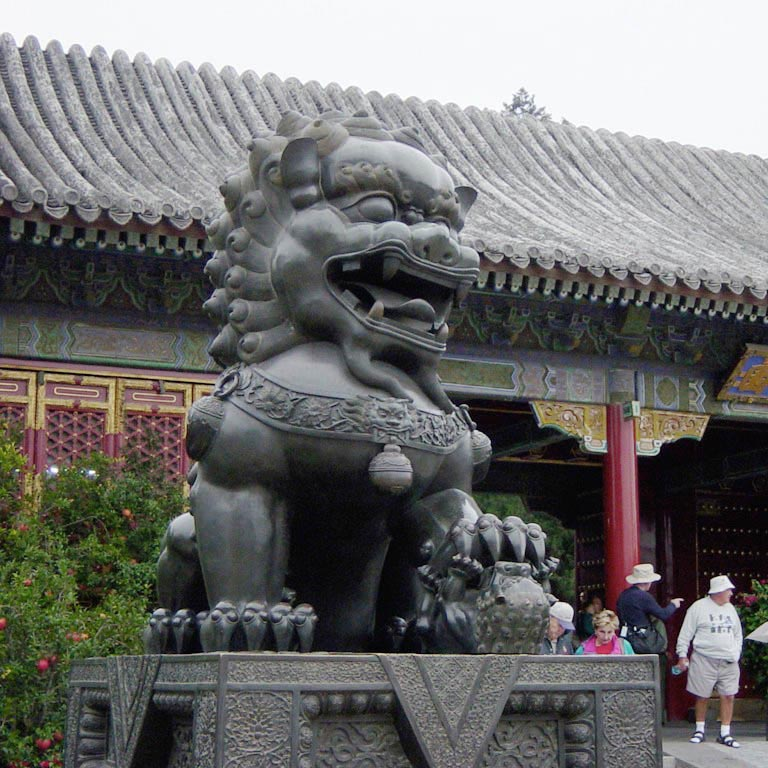
Female guardian lion with her cub at the Summer Palace of Beijing

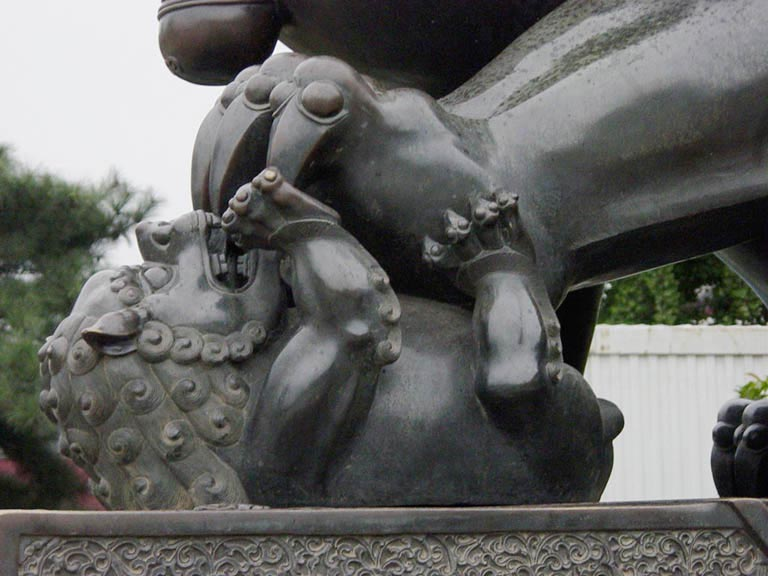
Cub detail

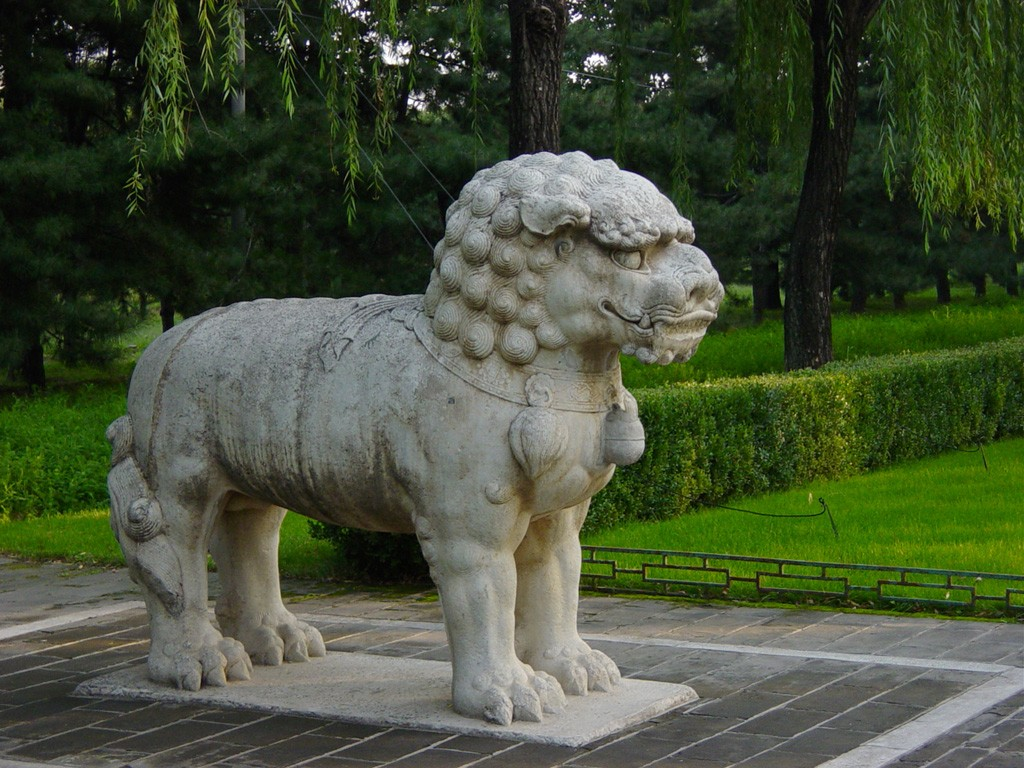
Standing lion at the Ming dynasty tombs Spirit Way

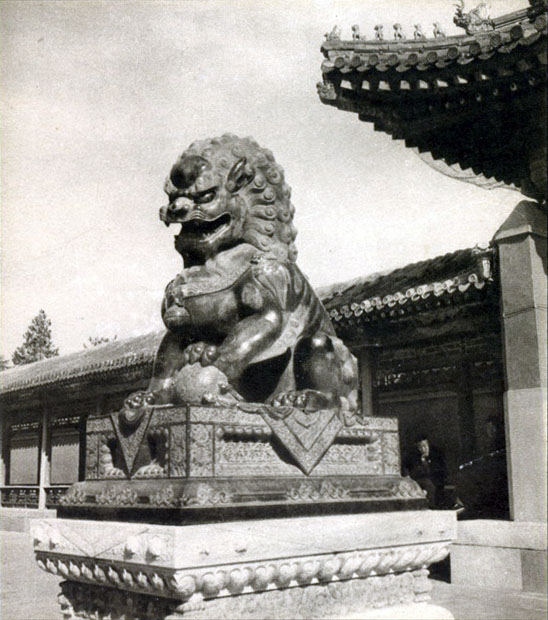
Statue of a mystical Chinese guardian lion in old Beijing, China

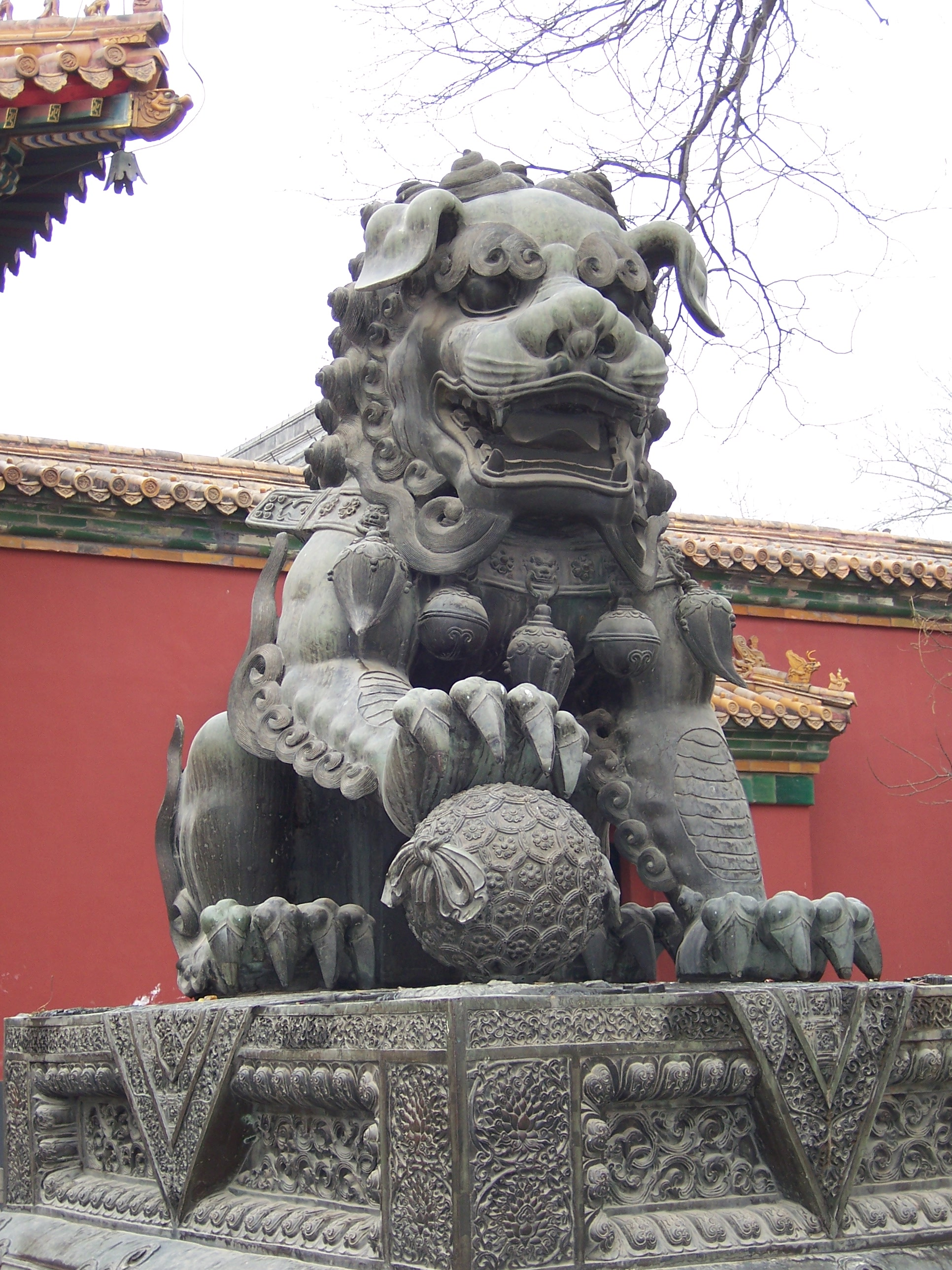
A guardian lion outside Yonghe Temple, Beijing

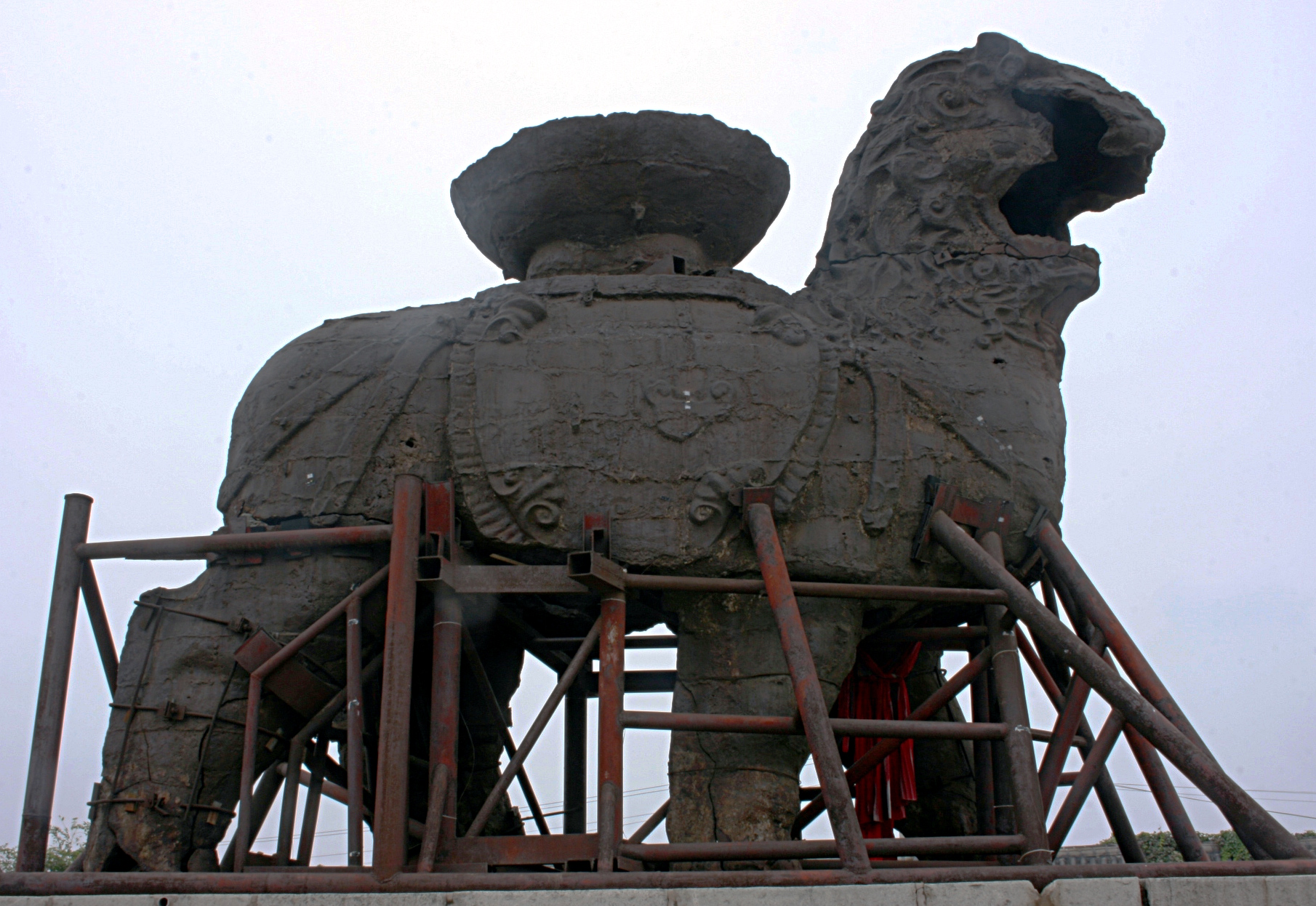
The Iron Lion of Cangzhou, cast in 953 AD, is the largest known and oldest surviving iron-cast artwork in China

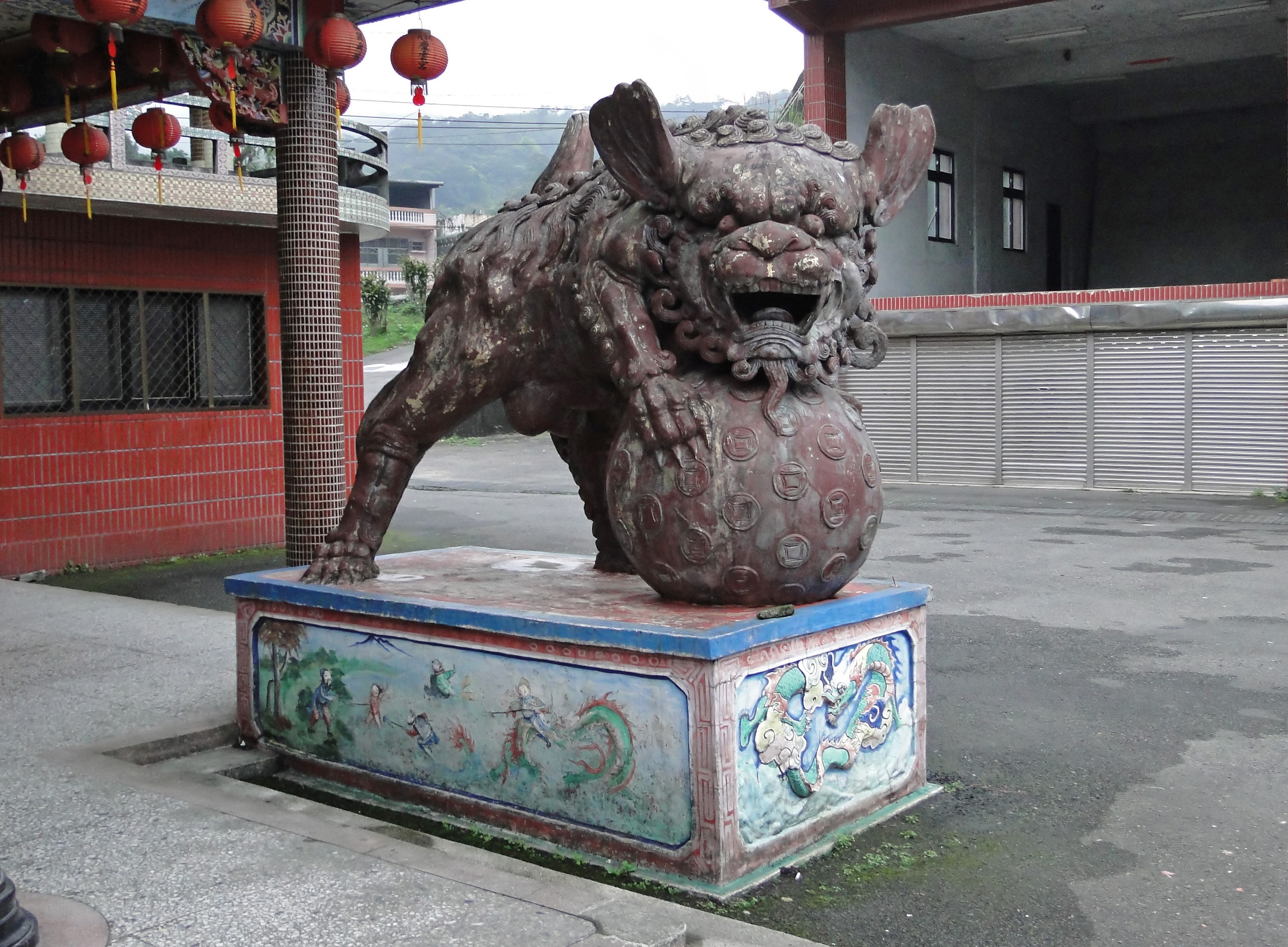
A guardian lion in Pingxi District, Taiwan

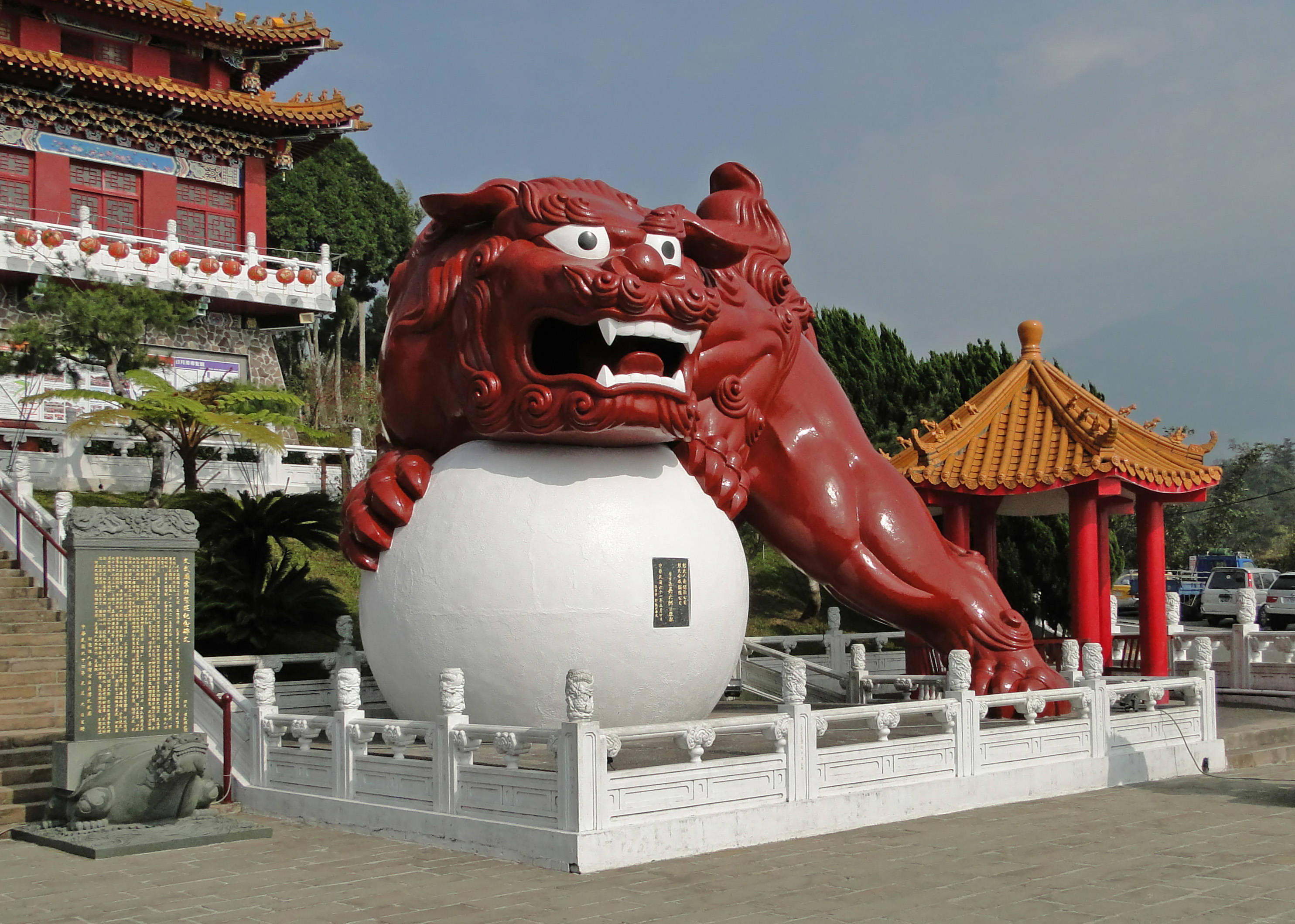
A guardian lion of Wen Wu Temple, Taiwan

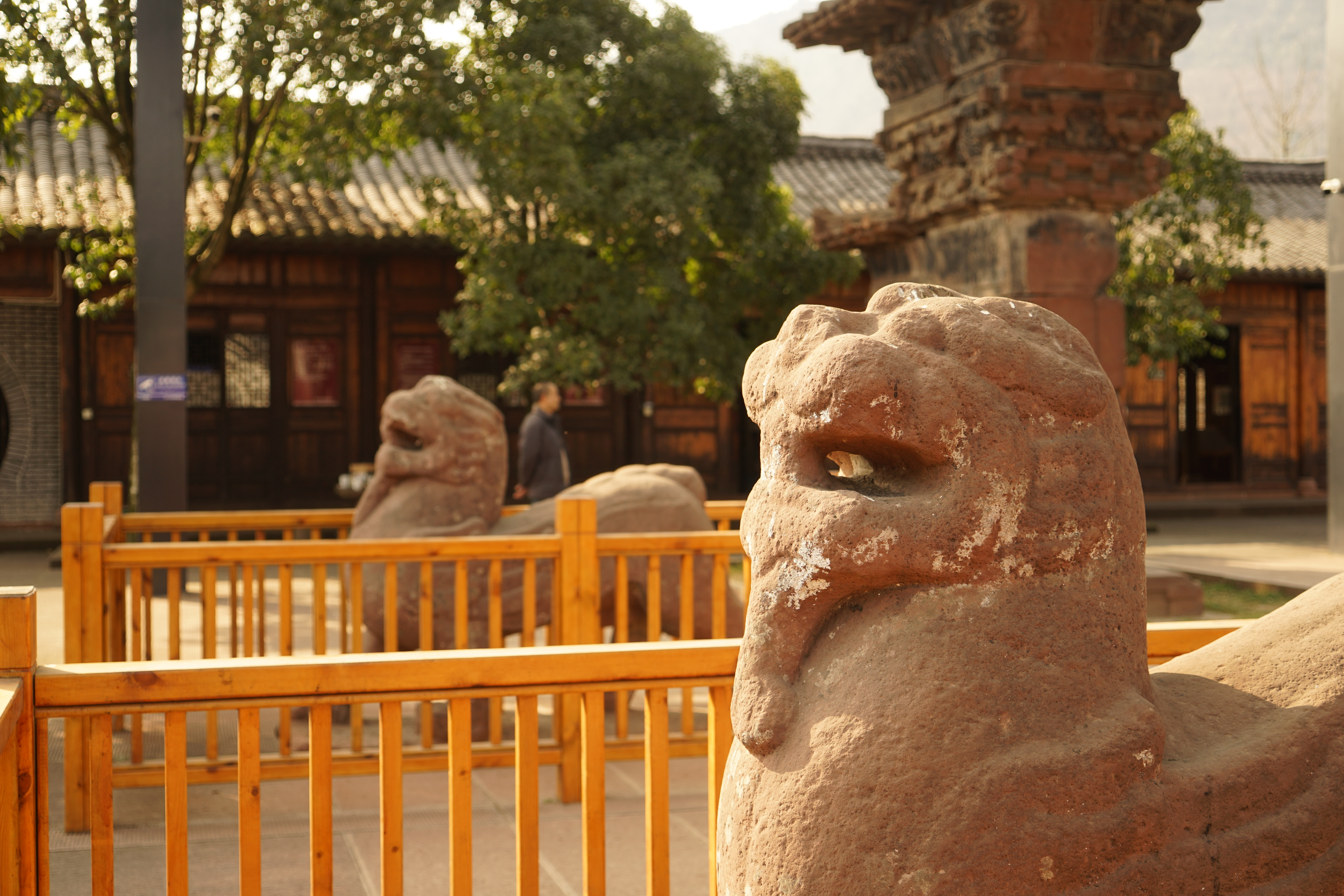
A pair of guardian lions of Gaoyi Que, 209 AD Han

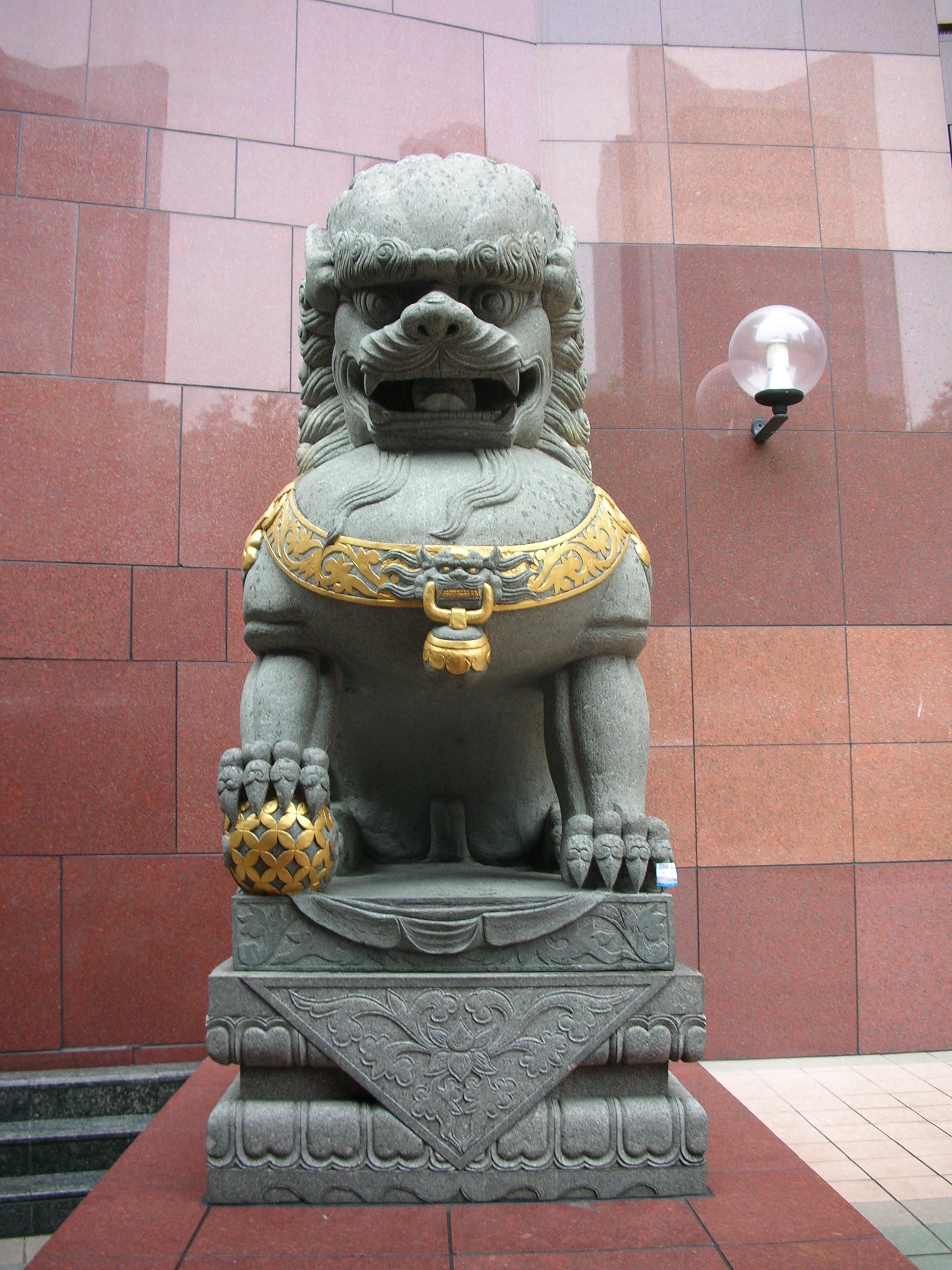
Imperial guardian lion outside Ngee Ann City in Singapore

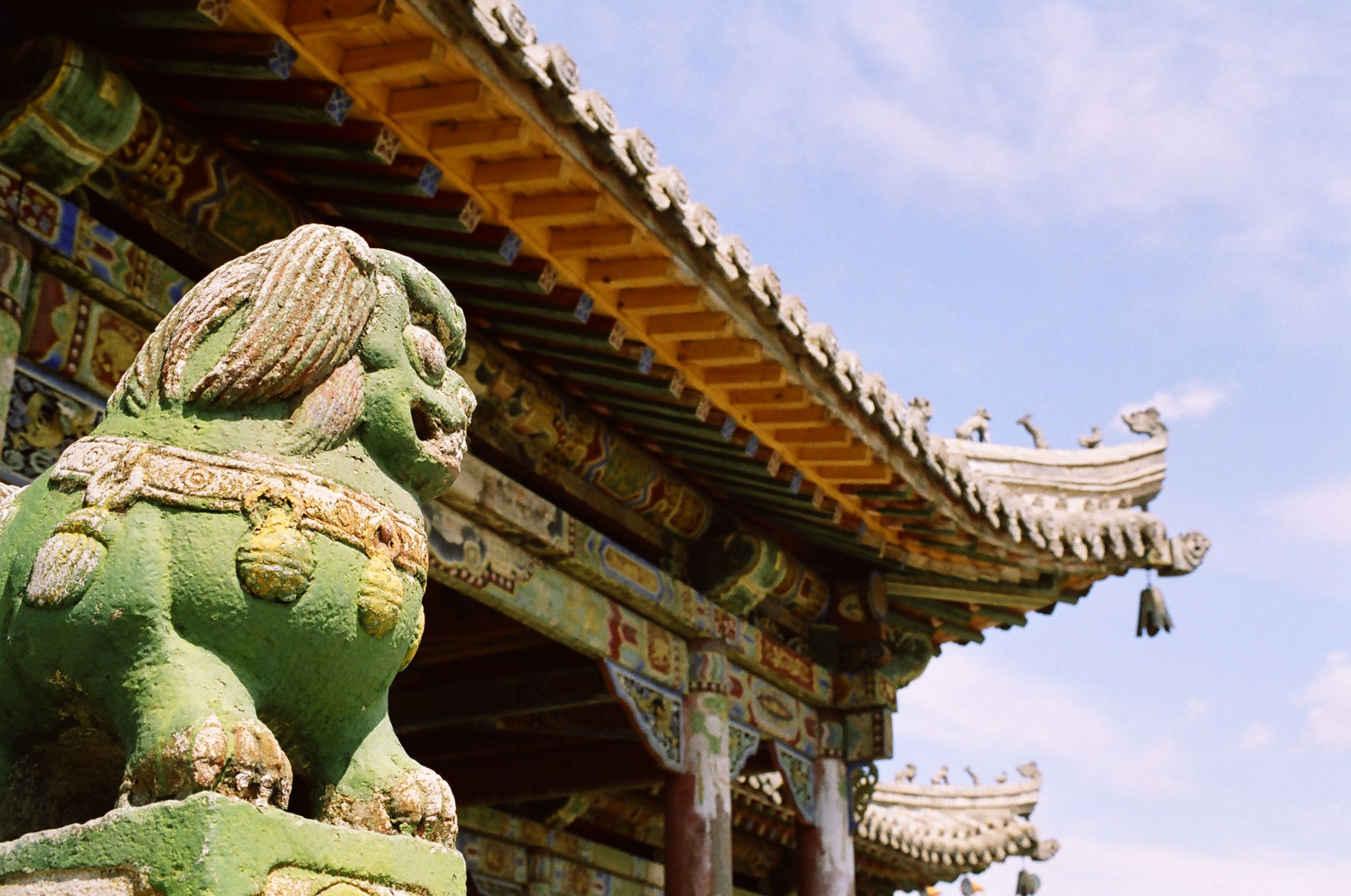
Guardian Lion outside the Green Palace, Ulaanbaatar, Mongolia

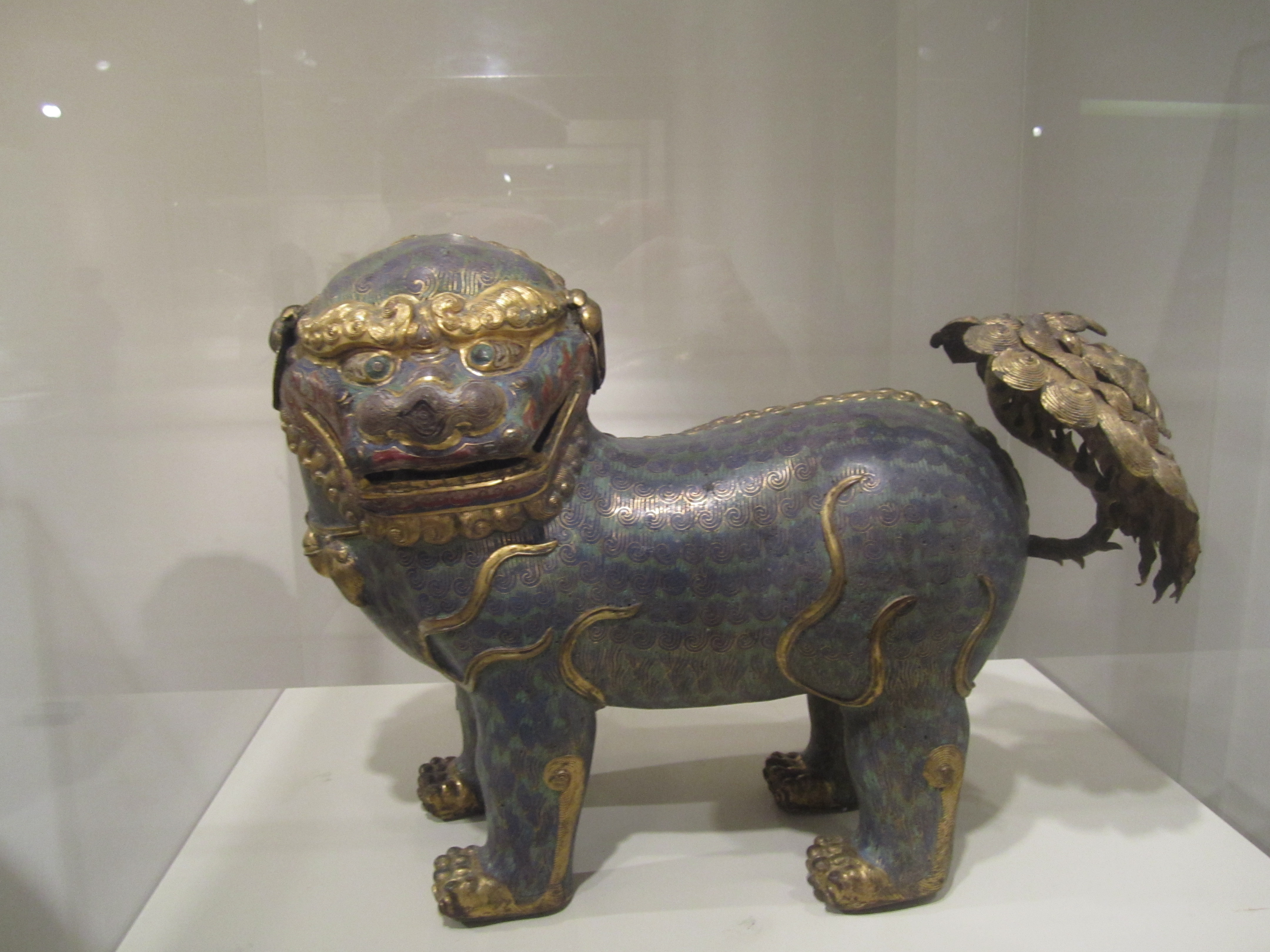
Guardian Lion, Brooklyn Museum, New York City

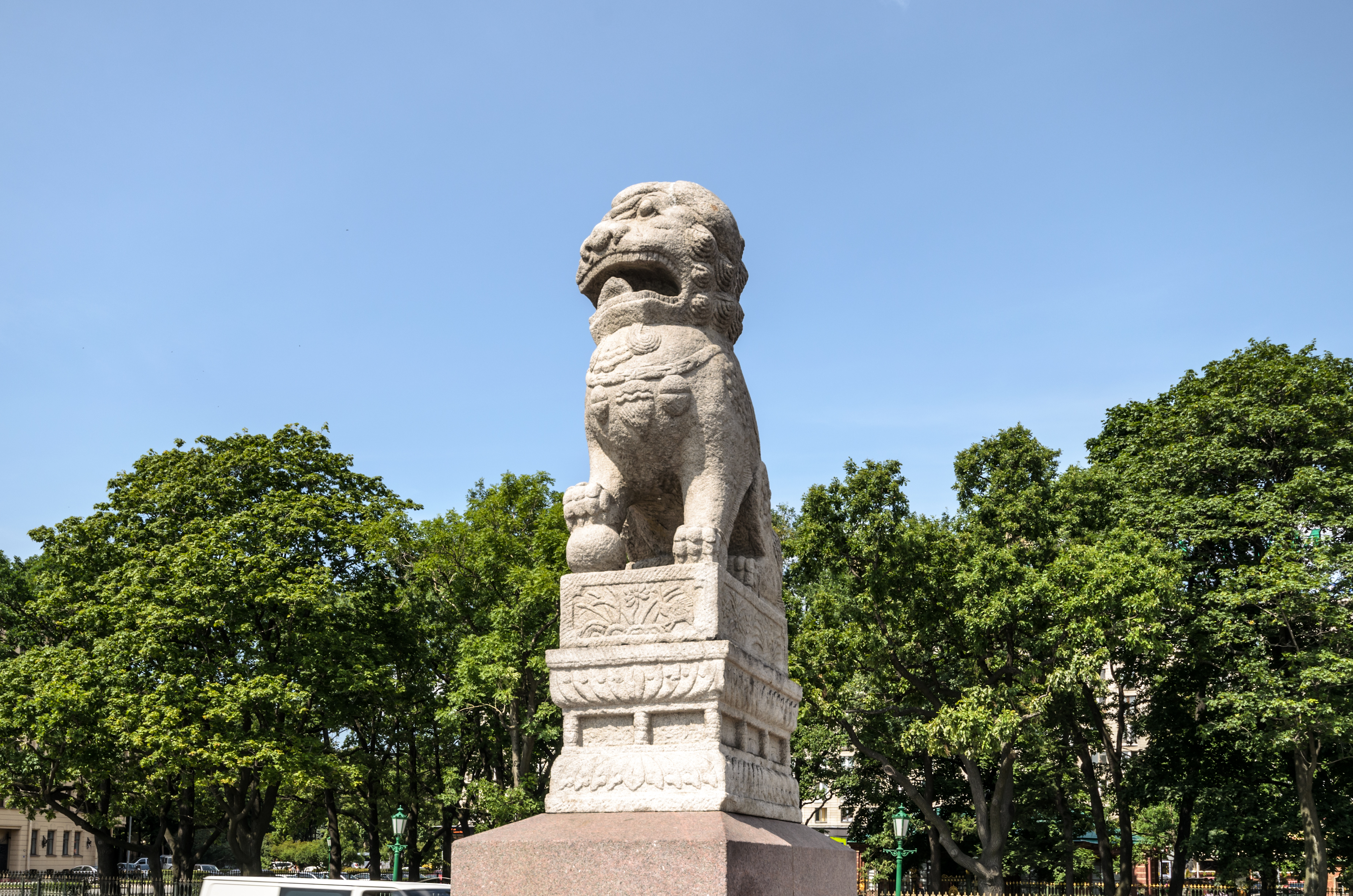
Guardian Lion in Saint Petersburg, Russia

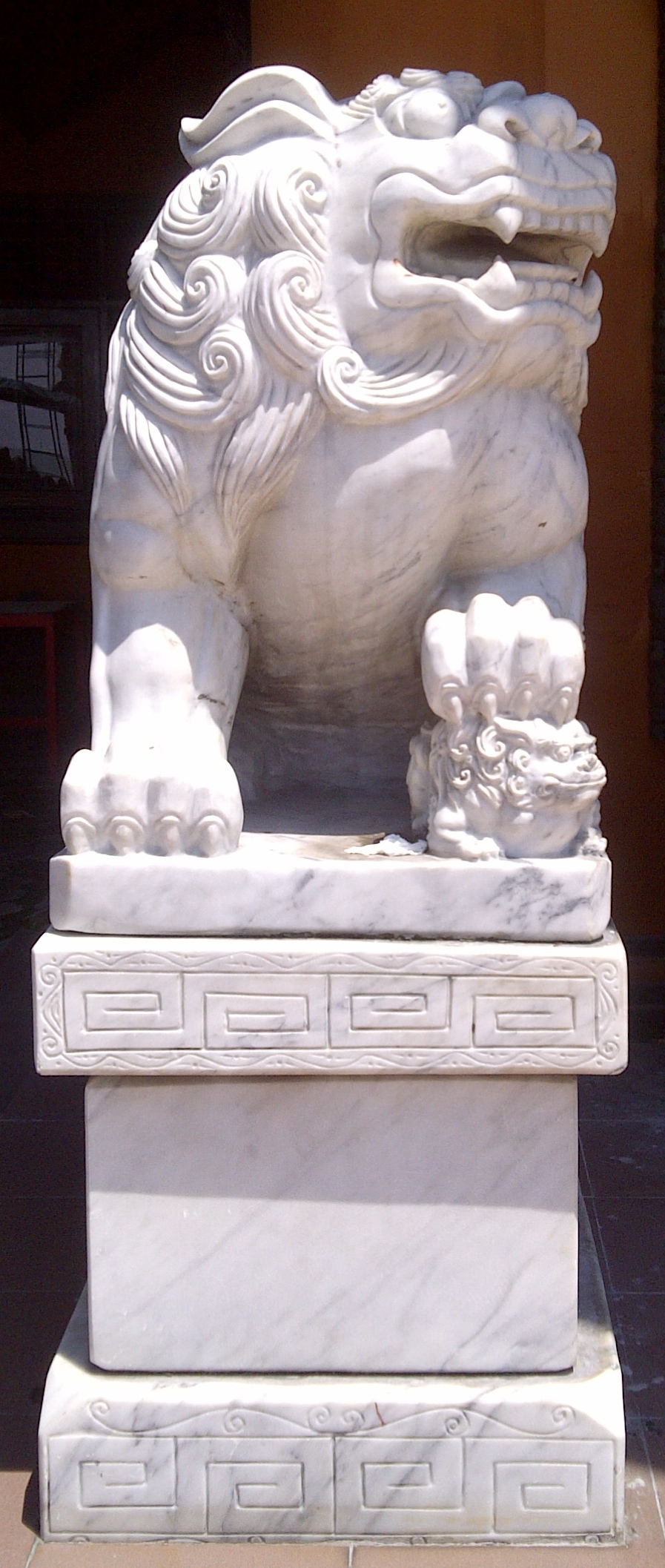
The left side statue represents Yin force, female, negative, take, carry a cub.

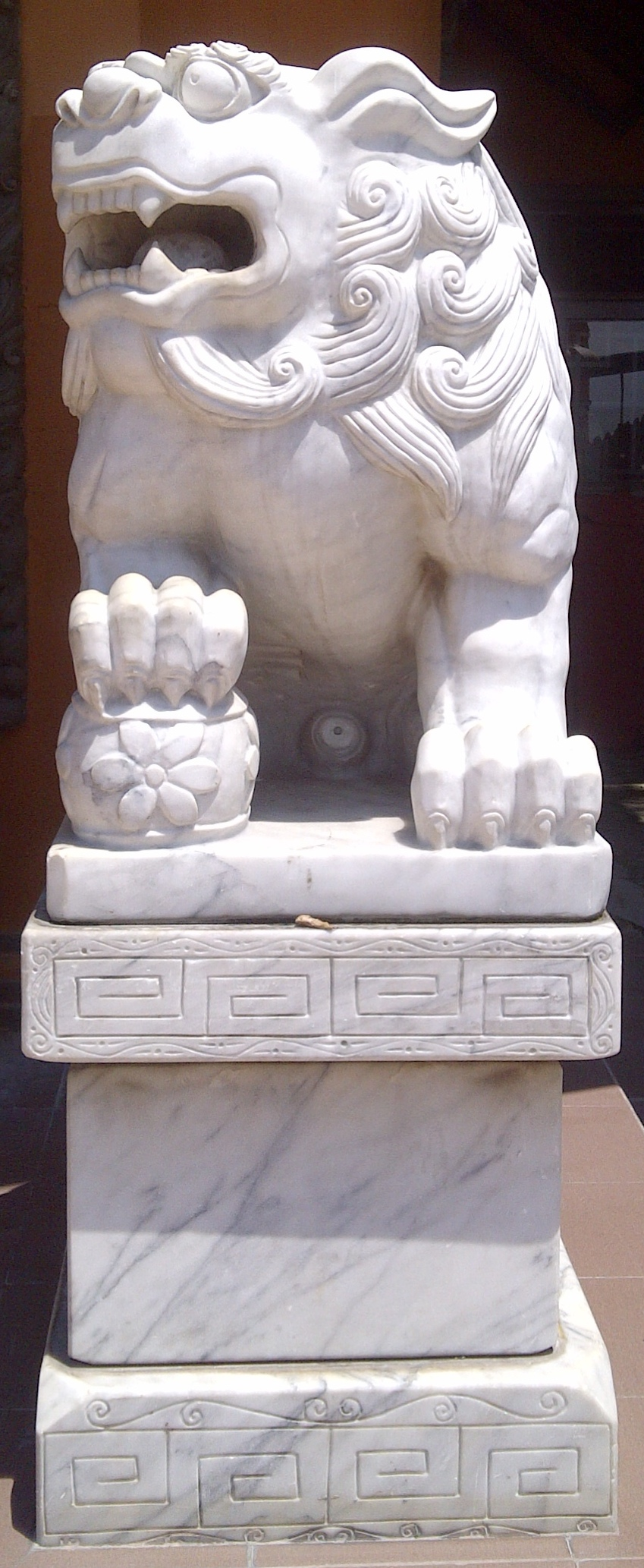
The right side statue represents Yang force, male, positive, bring, carry a ball.

== See also ==
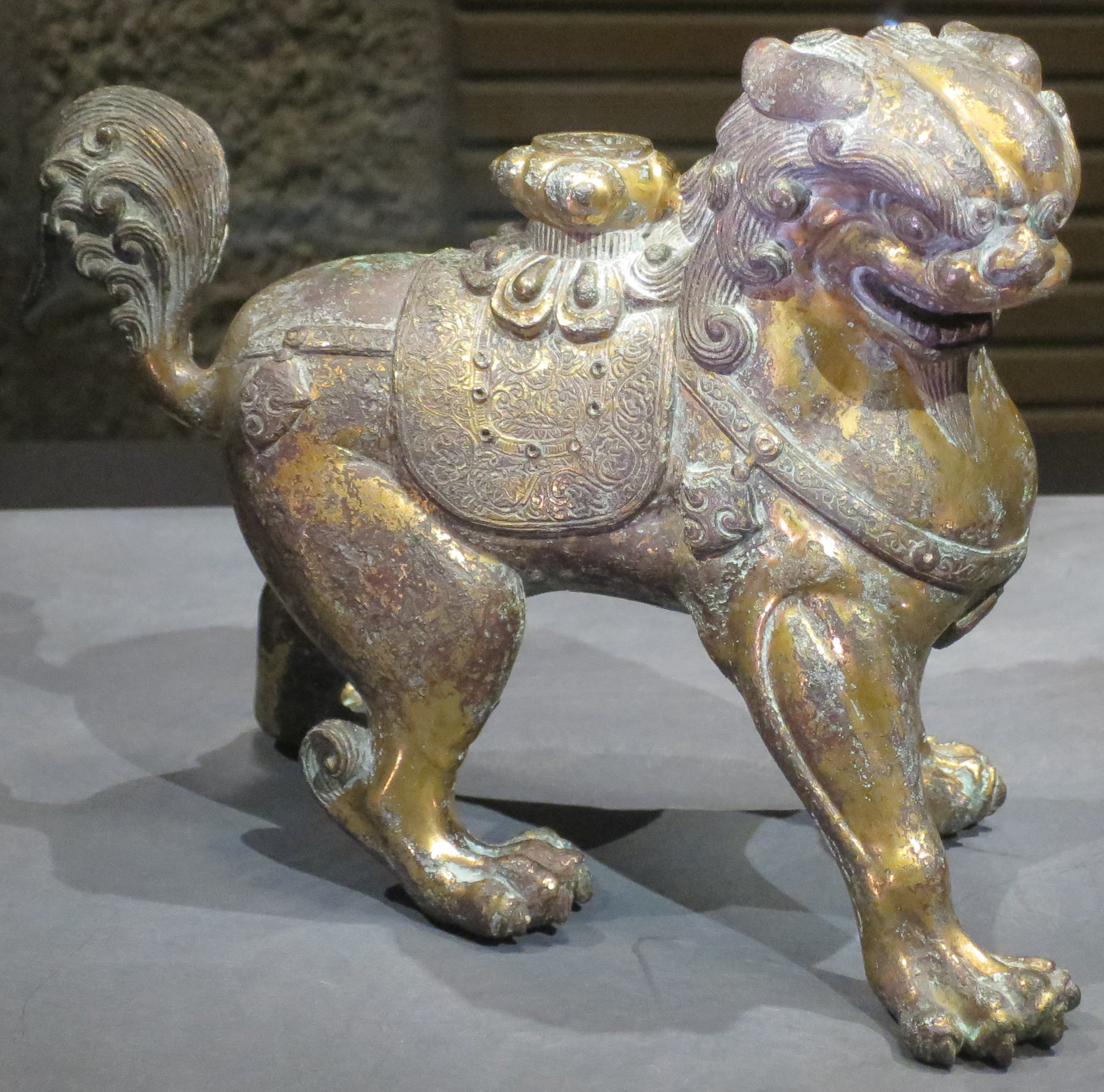
Bronze lion, 10th century

- Asiatic lions found in nearby India are the ones depicted in Chinese culture.
- Chimera
- Chinese culture
- Chinese dragon
- Chinese mythology
- Chinthe — similar lion statues in Burma, Laos and Cambodia
- Cultural depictions of lions
- Dvarapala
- Gargoyle
- Griffin
- Haetae to compare with similar lion-like statues in Korea
- Kanglā shā — a similar usage in Meitei culture
- Komainu to compare its use in Japanese culture
- Lamassu
- Lion dance — another use of lion imagery in costume and motion.
- Medici lions
- Menshen — also known as door gods
- Nghê — creatures with similar functions to Chinese guardian lions in Vietnamese culture
- Nian to compare with a similar, but horned (unicorn) mythical beast
- Piraeus Lion
- Pixiu to compare with a similar, but winged mythical beast
- Qilin — another mythical creature in Chinese culture
- Shisa — similar lion statues in the Ryukyu Islands
- Sphinx
- Tibetan Snow Lion
- Traditional Chinese Lions (Indianapolis Zoo)
- Xiezhi
