= Nghê =

Legendary creature in Vietnamese mythology

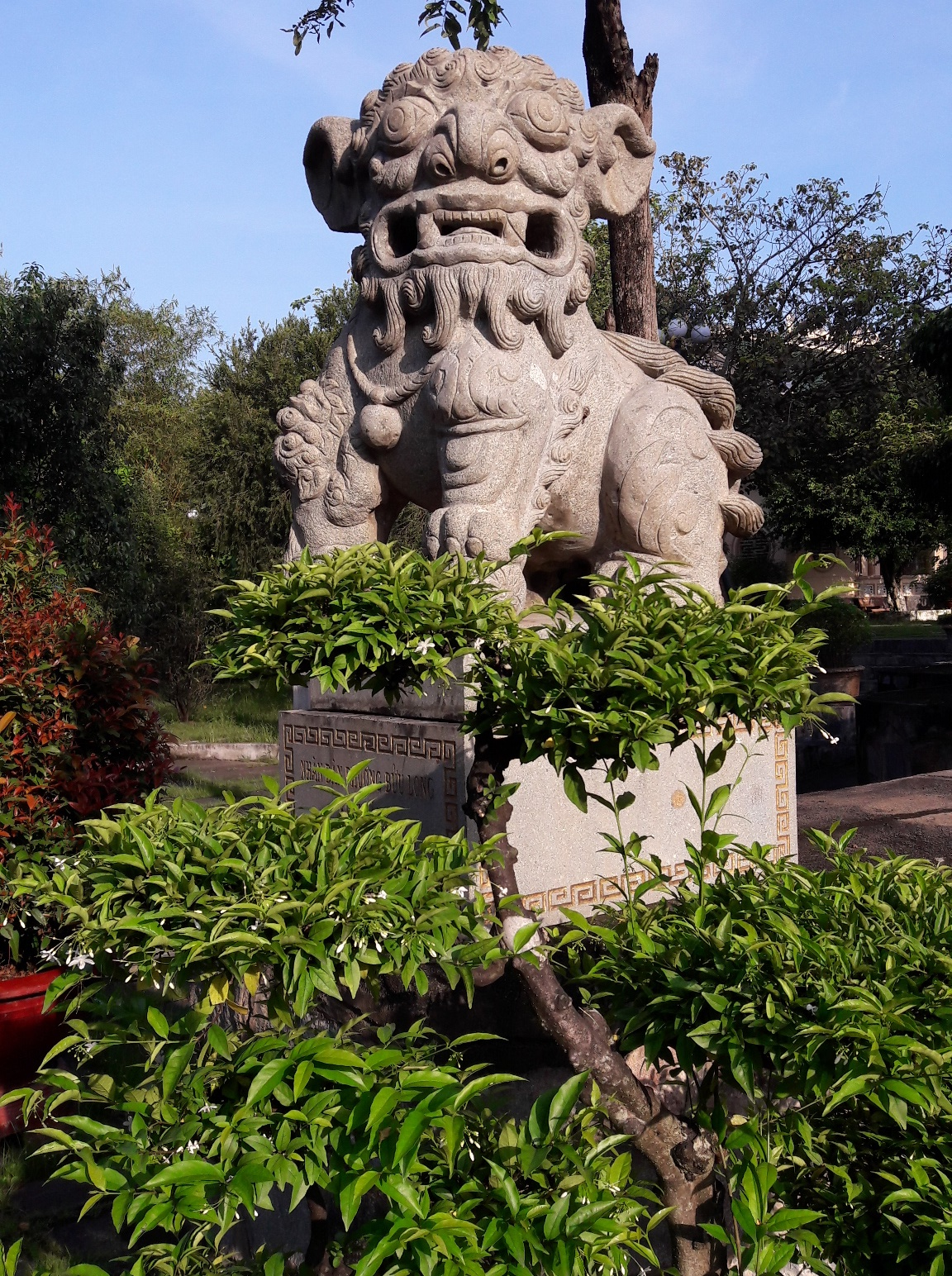
Big stone statue of Nghê at Trấn Biên Temple of Literature, Đồng Nai

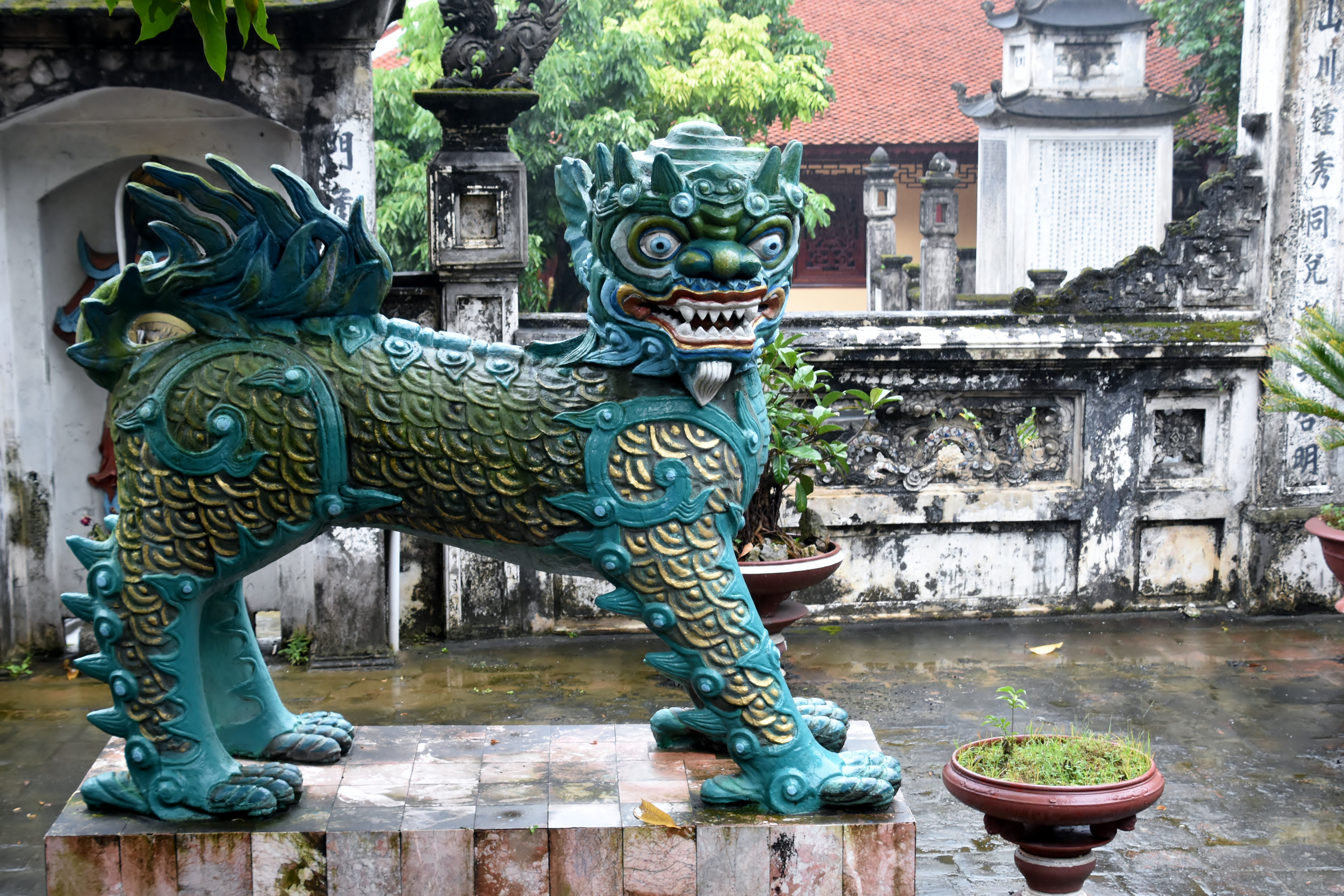
Nghê at Perfume Pagoda, Hanoi

Nghê (chữ Hán: 猊) is a mythical animal in Vietnamese culture, a combination of lion and dog, often used as a mascot in front of communal temples, temples, pagodas, shrines in Vietnam.

== Origin ==
The word nghê is derived from Sino-Vietnamese toan nghê (狻猊, Old Chinese *swar ŋe), meaning "lion", which itself was possibly loaned from a Central Asian languages. Nghê share the same origin with Chinese guardian lions, and just like its Chinese counterpart, since lions are not indigenous to Vietnam, depictions of nghê became more and more stylistic over times, incorporating features of local animals such as dogs.

Nghê is a popular element in ancient Vietnamese architecture. In rural countryside, stone statues of nghê are often found in front of the village gate, or the gate of the village communal temple. Individual houses may have a small stone nghê figure or a ceramic one instead.

At the Imperial City of Huế, two pairs of stone nghê stand guard in front of the Gate of Hiển Nhơn and the temple of Emperor Gia Long. Different from the typical village nghê in the northern Red River Delta, these two pairs are more grandiose, with elaborate carvings in the shapes of twisted feathers at the head, ears and tail, as well as flames on legs and spine. Imperial thrones from Nguyễn dynasty period had a couple of nghê under them. These thrones were placed at Thái Hoà Hall, the emperor's main reception hall used for court audiences and state ceremonies, demonstrating the symbolic significance of nghê.

== Artifacts ==
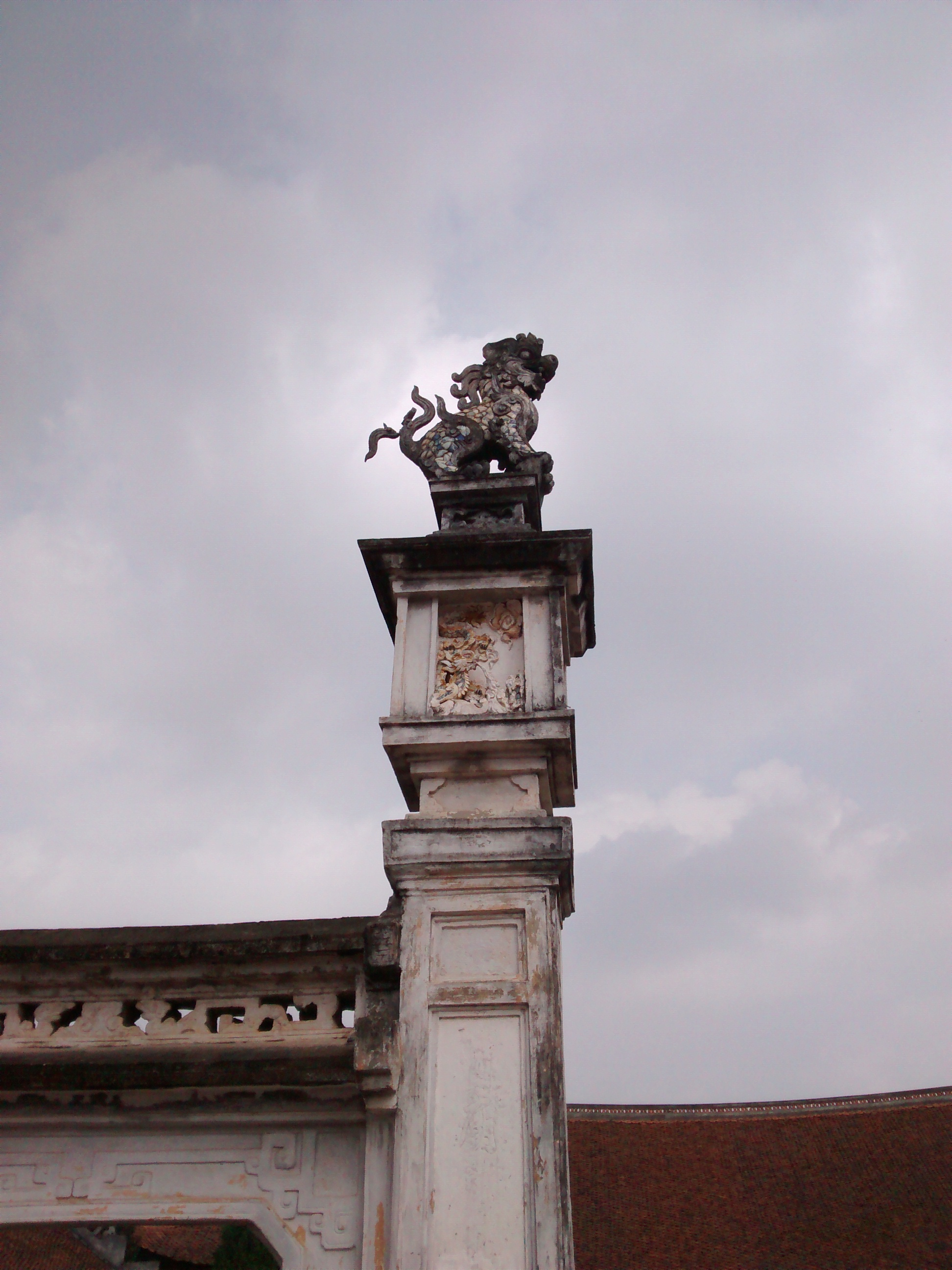
Nghê at the gate Mông Phụ communal temple, the old village Đường Lâm, Sơn Tây, Hanoi

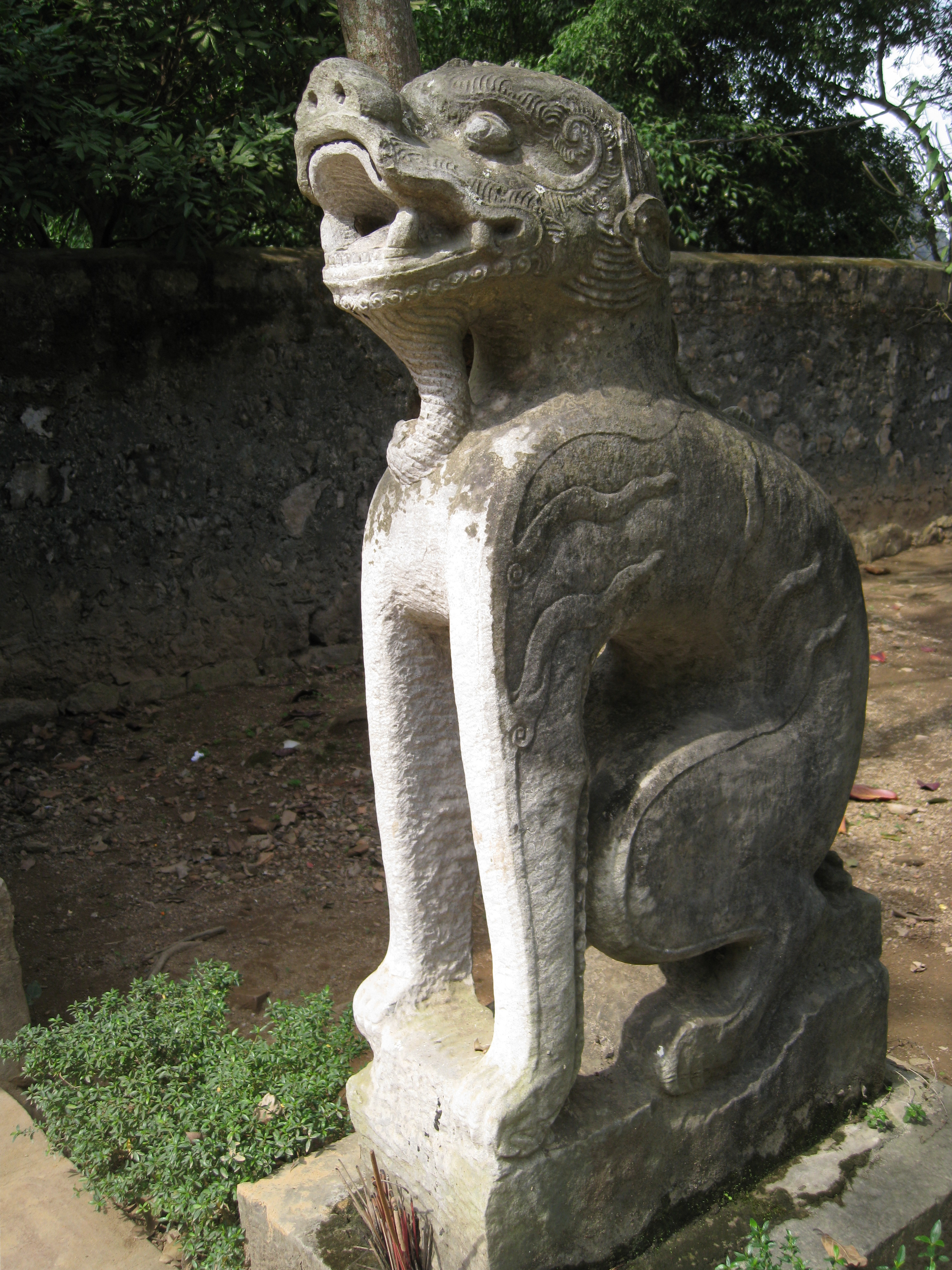
The stone nghê at Temple of Đinh Tiên Hoàng, Ninh Bình

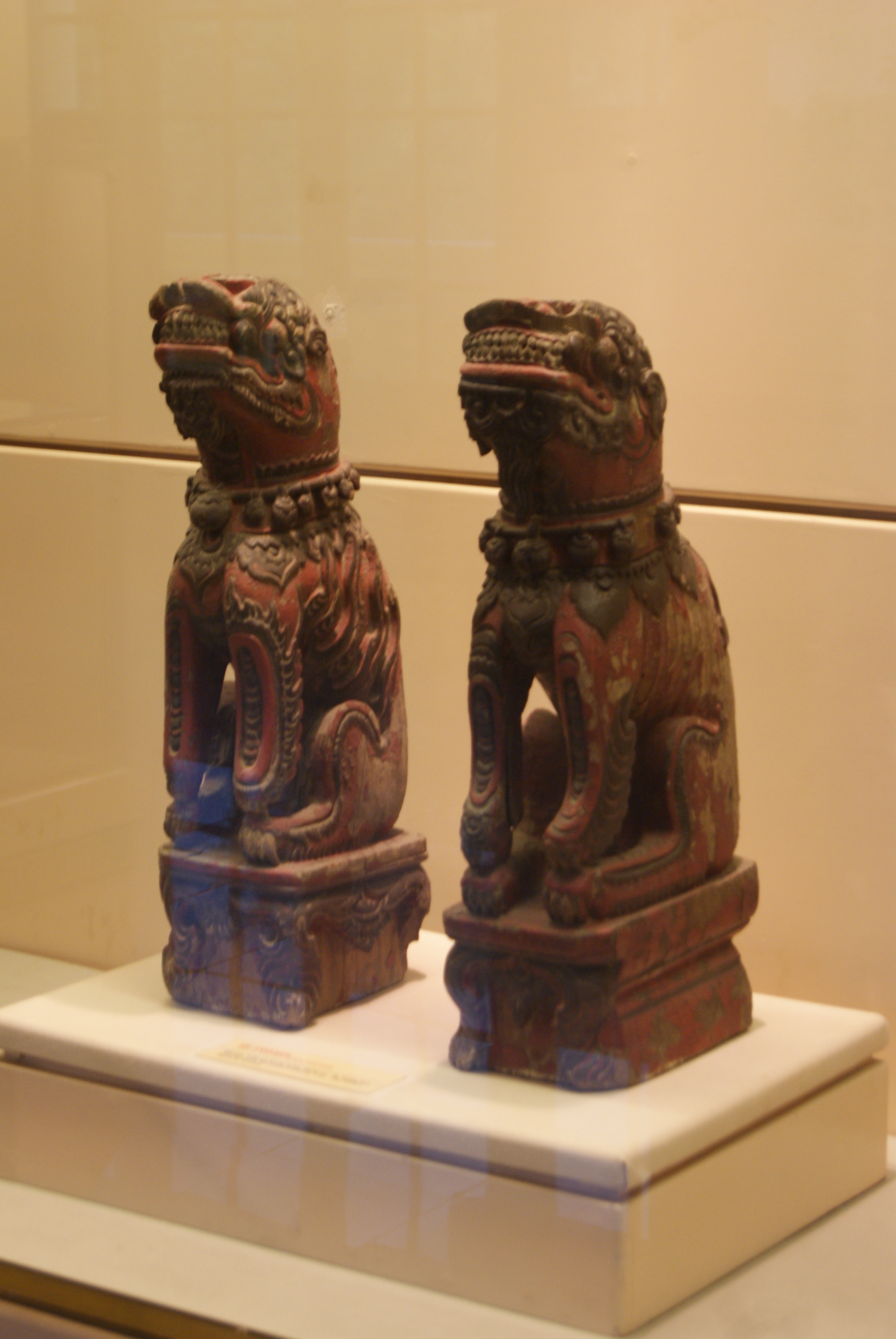
Nghê artifacts in the museum

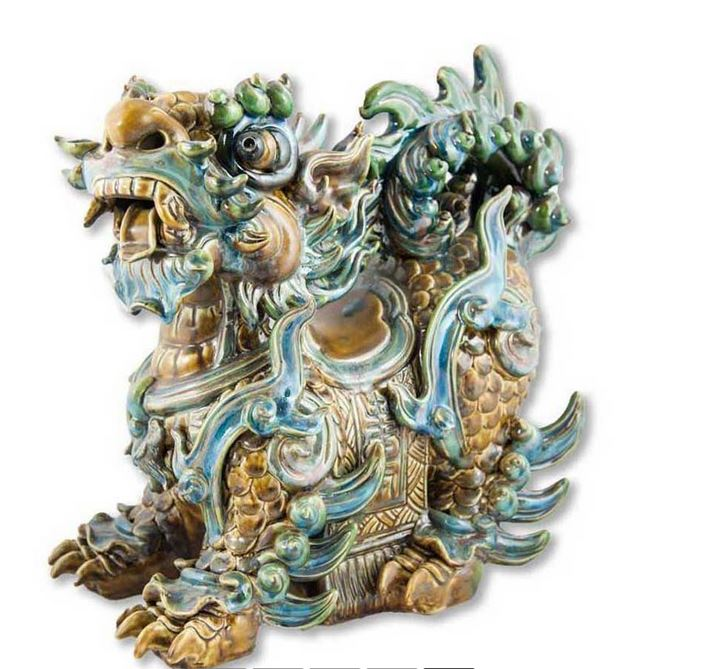
Nghê ancient, tail spread, Thanh Hải ceramic village, Vietnam

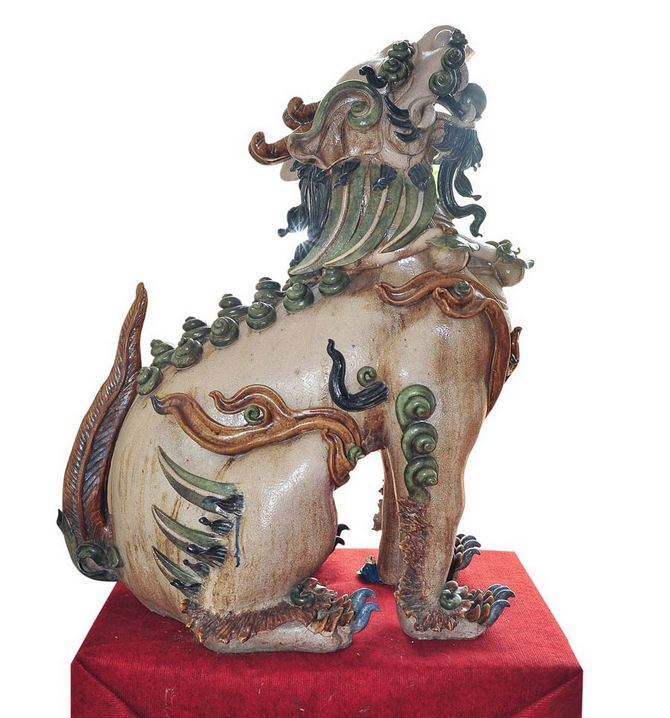
Nghê ancient, Thanh Hải Ceramic Village, Vietnam

Nghê-shaped antiques of Guimet Museum (Paris)

- The lampstand has an nghê statue, with the sign that it was made in 1637 in Bát Tràng.
- Nghê drawing disc, produced for the Middle East market and Muslim countries.

Nghê-shaped artifacts of Vietnam History Museum (Hanoi):

- The top has a cap, white and gray enamel cracks. Revival Lê dynasty, April of Vĩnh Hựu year 2 (1736). The top has a dome-shaped lid, the top is a statue of a nghê playing with jade, around the bagua, a flat edge of the mouth, a bulging body, 3 animal legs embossed with tigers, 2 dragon-shaped straps. Embossed with ribbons of flip-flops, T-verses, cardinal leaves and dragons in the clouds. Minh Văn engraved on the base. Vĩnh Hựu vạn niên chi nhị, tứ nguyệt nhật cung tác). Gray white stretch enamel.
- Nậm Wine, colorful enamel. Mạc – Revival Lê dynasty, 16th–17th centuries. Nậm has a cylindrical high neck, a standing mouth, a divided body with 6 floating petals shaped like petals, embossed with nghê and flowers, and a brown base border. Ivory and moss green enamel.
- Nghê statue, ivory white enamel and moss green. Revival Lê dynasty, 17th century. Statue of Nghê on a rectangular pedestal, sitting in adoration, 2 front legs propped up, 2 hind legs bent, head raised, neck wearing a string of floating music. Around the body and legs touch the clouds. Rectangular base carved with clouds, lotus flowers and anise. Ivory white and moss green enamel.
- The jar has a lid, glaze and blue. Nguyễn dynasty, Gia Long era (1802–1819). The dome-shaped lid with the top is a statue of a nghê playing with jade, drawing clouds around. The hat has a curved mouth edge, a short neck, bulging shoulders, a high body, and a wide base. Embossed shoulders with 4 lion heads in a circle. Draw the theme of landscapes, houses, trees, people wearing umbrellas, people rowing boats. Minh Văn writes in enamel on the bottom. "Gia Long Niên Chế" (Made in the Gia Long era).
- The jar has a lid, white and blue enamel. Nguyễn dynasty, Gia Long era (1802–1819). The cap has a crown in the shape of a jade playing with jade, drawing flowers and leaves of blue enamel. The jar has a flat rim, a short neck, bulging shoulders, and a concave bottom. On the shoulder are embossed 4 lion heads with rings. Around the body are painted lam tiêu – tượng, mã – liễu, tùng – lộc. Minh Văn wrote 4 letters. "Gia Long Niên tạo" (Made in the Gia Long era). Brown, white and blue enamel.
- The altar has a lid, enamel, and ivory. Revival Lê dynasty, 18th century. The altar has 2 parts, the mouth is oval, the lid is decorated with the nghê's knob, the leaf ribbon is flipped, mai – cúc – trúc – tùng, "vạn" character, hổ phù. Men stretch ivory.
- Nghê statue, made of clay. Lê – Nguyễn dynasties, 18th–19th centuries Nghê stands on a rectangular pedestal, around the body embossed with clouds. Brown red.
- Nghê statue, made of clay. Lê – Nguyễn dynasties, 18th–19th centuries. Elephant kneels on a rectangular pedestal, tail twisted, body embossed with clouds. Brown red.

== See also ==
- Chinese guardian lions
- Komainu
- Chinthe
- Kitsune
- Nio
- Xiezhi
