= Warriner =

Wariner or Warriner is a surname. Notable people with the name include:

== Sportspeople ==
- Alan Warriner-Little (born 1962), né Warriner, English professional darts player
- Ed Warinner (born 1961), American football coach and former player
- Jeremy Wariner (born 1984), American track athlete
- Leroy Warriner (1919–2003), American racing driver
- Michael Warriner (1908–1986), English rower
- Samantha Warriner (born 1971), English-born New Zealander triathlete
- Steve Warriner, English former footballer
- Todd Warriner (born 1974), Canadian ice-hockey forward

== Others ==
- David Dortch Warriner (1929–1986), United States federal judge
- Doreen Warriner, (1904–1974), British academic and refugee worker in Czechoslovakia in 1938-1939
- E. C. Warriner (1866–1945), American educator
- Frederic Warriner (1916–1992), American stage actor
- Frederick Warriner (1884–1966), mayor of Winnipeg in 1937
- John E. Warriner (c. 1907–1987), author of the textbook series Warriner's English Grammar and Composition
- Steve Wariner (born 1954), American country-music singer-songwriter
- Tony Warriner (born 1968), English video game designer
- Virginia Warriner, New Zealand professor of business
