= Historical Library (disambiguation) =

Historical library may refer to:

- Bibliotheca historica, a work of universal history by Diodorus Siculus
- Bentley Historical Library
- Clarke Historical Library
- Seeley Historical Library
- Illinois State Historical Library, housed in the Abraham Lincoln Presidential Library and Museum
- Naval Historical Library, managed by the Naval Historical Branch
