= Charles V. Park =

American librarian

Charles V. Park

Charles V. Park (January 19, 1885 – September 11, 1982) was a librarian after whom the Charles V. Park Library at Central Michigan University is named after.

== Career ==
Park graduated with an A.B. degree from Stanford University in 1909. He received a library certificate from the New York Public Library in 1915. He was an assistant librarian at Stanford University from 1910 to 1930. He was the Director of the Central Michigan University library from 1930 until his retirement in 1957. The library building at Central Michigan University was named after him in 1968. He died in 1982 at the age of 97.

In his memoir “A Country Boy’s Road to College” Park writes “J.E. Goodwin, Assistant Librarian in charge of services to the public decided to try to find two or three students who would be interested in working full time in the library – seven hours per day – while they carried a part-time schedule of graduate work." This proposal from J.E. Goodwin at Stanford came to Park during his senior year of studies in economics at the institution. Two years later, Park's economics professor, while accepting a new position at Cornell, offered Park the opportunity to study for his Ph.D. as his assistant. At the same time, Park was offered the assistant librarian position at Stanford as the aforementioned J.E. Goodwin resigned his position.

In 1931 Park accepted a new position as the head of libraries at Central State Teacher’s College now known as Central Michigan University. In his first year there, the school's newsletter reported his improvements to the library, which included moving the service desk away from quiet reading areas and purchasing several volumes at reduced cost and great value to the small-budgeted library. Later, when asked why he chose to move from Stanford (with a larger budget) to Central Michigan, Park (quoting Caesar) stated “I’d rather be first in a Siberian village than second in Rome." Park helped to “enlarge and enrich the book collection, assemble a professional staff, establish a library science department and build a new building." Park's decision to use a ‘modular’ building because it was inexpensive and allowed for simpler additions. The new library building opened to users in 1969.

Another of Park's goals for the CMU library was to begin a department to instruct future college librarians. Park began a library sciences program at CMU. Outside of the university library, there are records of Park's activity serving in the professional organization of College and Research librarians, particularly as they involve the education of new librarians. He was secretary of the organization during the years 1944-1945, and published in their journal in June 1945 in an edition of the journal devoted to the education of librarians. Park's contribution, entitled “Degrees as They Affect Teachers’ College Librarians” asks for the professional librarian to be on par with the professional teacher/professor – in pay scale and in required amount of coursework to get there.

== Personal life ==
Park was born in Hill City, Kansas. His parents were Abraham and Lovina Park. He married Frances Odenheimer on September 1, 1917 in Los Angeles, California. They had a son and daughter together, James "Ted" and Mrs. Ray (Persis) Rynberg.
