= Clarke Historical Library =

Part of Central Michigan University

The Clarke Historical Library is part of Central Michigan University in Mount Pleasant, Michigan, United States. It is located within the Charles V. Park Library on the campus. The library was founded in 1954 by Norman E. Clarke Sr., who gave his library and collections to the college, which he had attended as a young man. The library began with the 1,500 books, 60 groups of manuscripts, 150 maps, 400 visual items and 50 broadsides, including a few early papers. His collections included numerous memoirs, works of scholarships, treasures, opinion pieces, and works of fiction.

The Michigan Historical Review is a peer-reviewed, academic journal of Michigan history that was published semiannually by the Clarke Historical Library and the History Department at Central Michigan University between 1974 and 2021. It is currently published by the Historical Society of Michigan. The Clarke also houses a variety of Ernest Hemingway publications, a well-known 20th-century writer born and partially raised in Michigan. The collection includes Hemingway's papers, and photographs from his cottage on Walloon Lake in northern Michigan. Clarke Historical Library encourages individuals, groups, and organizations to use its materials to conduct research and undergraduate study. The library created a website in 1996.

The Clarke is a repository of Central Michigan University's archives and documents related to Michigan's history and literature. Its collections include a children's literature section and archives of EC Warriner, the fourth president of the university. The Clarke offers public programs, such as exhibits and speakers, twice a year.
