= Central Michigan University Libraries =

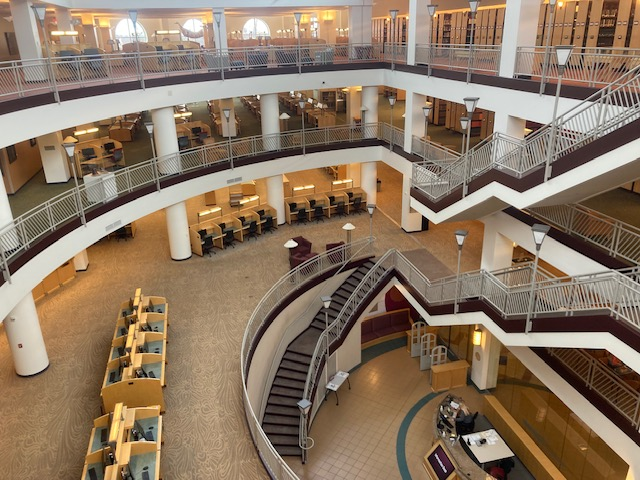
- 43.58934°N 84.77429°W
- Location: Central Michigan University; Mount Pleasant, Michigan, United States
- Type: Academic library
- Established: 1893

Other information
- Website: library.cmich.edu

The Central Michigan University Libraries consists of the two libraries (the University Library and the Clarke Historical Library) which support Central Michigan University, a public university in Mount Pleasant, Michigan. The CMU Libraries meets the research, information, and study needs of the students, faculty, and staff of the university, as well as researchers outside the university community. The library building is named after Charles V. Park, who was the library director at CMU from 1931 through 1957.

== History ==
Central Michigan University was founded in 1892, and from 1893 until 1925 the library was housed in “Old Main,” which was the first building constructed on campus. By the 1920s, the library's collection had outgrown the space available in Old Main and plans for a new library building were drafted.

On December 7, 1925, however, Old Main burned to the ground and the library collection was destroyed. The university built Warriner Hall in its place and the east wing of the new building was given to the library. Upon opening, the two-story reading room could accommodate 250 students and 10,000 volumes. An adjoining room housed additional books. By 1933, the print collection had grown to more than 30,000 volumes and the need for additional shelf space, as well as student study space, became apparent.

A separate library building (the current Ronan Hall) was built and opened to students in February 1956. The new library had space for the library’s 90,000 volumes and seating for 750 students. It also included a special library and rare books area to accommodate the volumes recently donated by Dr. Norman Clarke Sr.

The library’s collections had grown to 170,000 items by 1965, and plans were drawn up for another, larger library. The new building, the 173,500 square foot Charles V. Park Library, opened to students in 1969 and featured seating for more than 2,000 users.

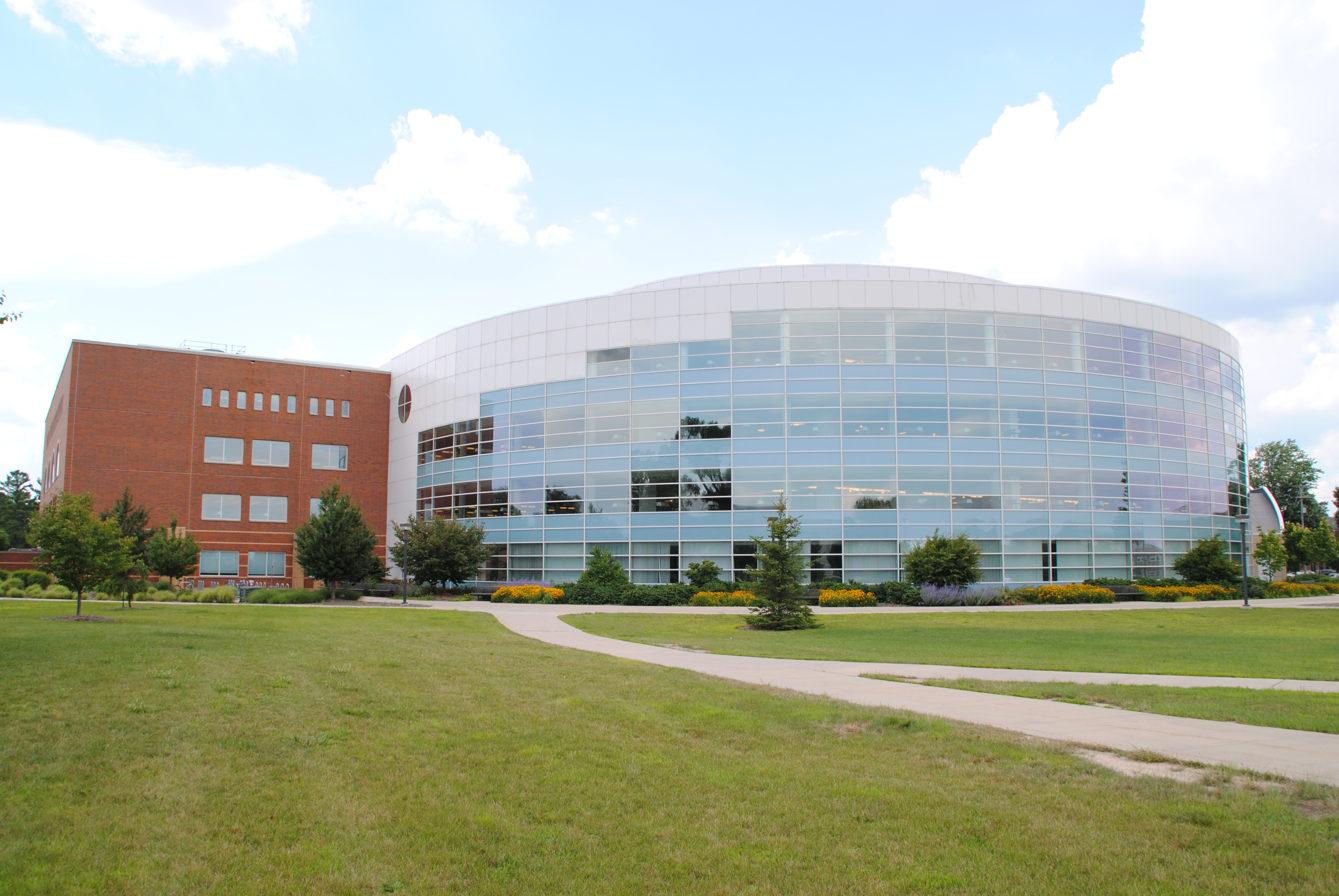
Charles V. Park Library at Central Michigan University

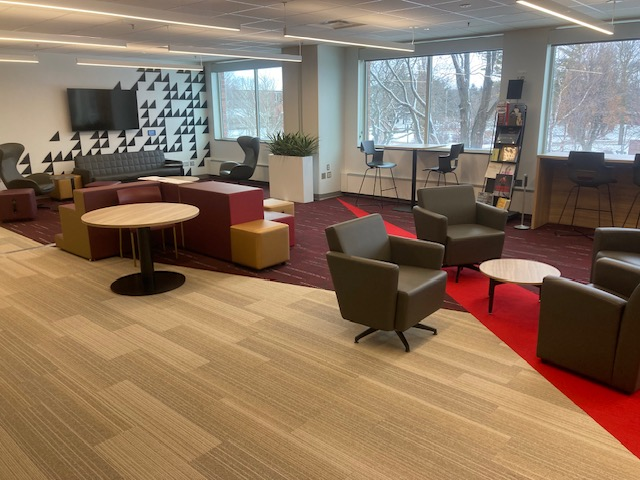
The Adobe Digital Lounge in the Park Library

The Park Library was renovated and enlarged from 1999-2001 and opened to the public in January 2002. The current building offers more than 300,000 square feet of space and seating for more than 2,500 users. The University Library offers more than 250 public computer workstations and wifi connectivity, as well as full scanning and printing capabilities. A number of academic support units, such as the CMU Writing Center, the Mathematics Assistance Center, the Presentation Skills Center, the Certified Testing Center, and the Statistical Consulting Center are also located in the building. The Park Library also houses the Office of Information Technology Help Desk on the 1st floor and the Curriculum and Instruction Support unit on the 4th floor. In the Fall of 2021, the Adobe Digital Lounge opened on the 2nd floor of the library. It provides training and support to CMU students, faculty, and staff in the use of Adobe products.

The Sarah and Daniel Opperman Auditorium, a 129-seat auditorium used for library and campus speakers and events, is located on the 1st floor of the building.

The Clarke Historical Library is located on the 1st floor of the Park Library. It houses an extensive collection of special, rare, and archival materials, as well as exhibit spaces and a reading room.

== Services ==
The library has more than 250 computers available for public use, some of which are PCs and some Macintoshes. Wifi is also available in the building for users who bring their own laptops and devices. Printing and scanning are available. Laptops, digital cameras, power cords, and other technologies are available for checkout at the Library Services Desk on the 2nd floor.

CMU students, faculty, and staff have a wide range of library services available to them, whether they take classes on campus in Mount Pleasant or participate in one of the university's online or distance programs. These services include Ask a Librarian online research help, research consultations, literature searching and the creation of systematic reviews, interlibrary loan and document delivery, course reserves, and assistance with scholarly communication matters such as copyright, publishing, and author rights. CMU librarians also provide information literacy instruction to classes upon request from faculty members.

A variety of study spaces are available, including quiet individual study rooms, group study rooms, collaborative space, and general library seating. The library's 1 North Study Room is a swipe access space available on a 24/7 basis throughout the year.

== Global Campus Library Services ==
The Global Campus Library Services (GCLS) department was established in 1976 as a partnership between the university’s adult and online learning unit and the CMU Libraries. GCLS delivered a full range of library materials and services to the more than 7,500 students and faculty studying and teaching at remote centers across Michigan, the United States, Canada, and Mexico. Later, the unit also served the university’s online classes and programs. The GCLS unit ceased to exist in 2018 when it was combined with the library’s main Reference Department.

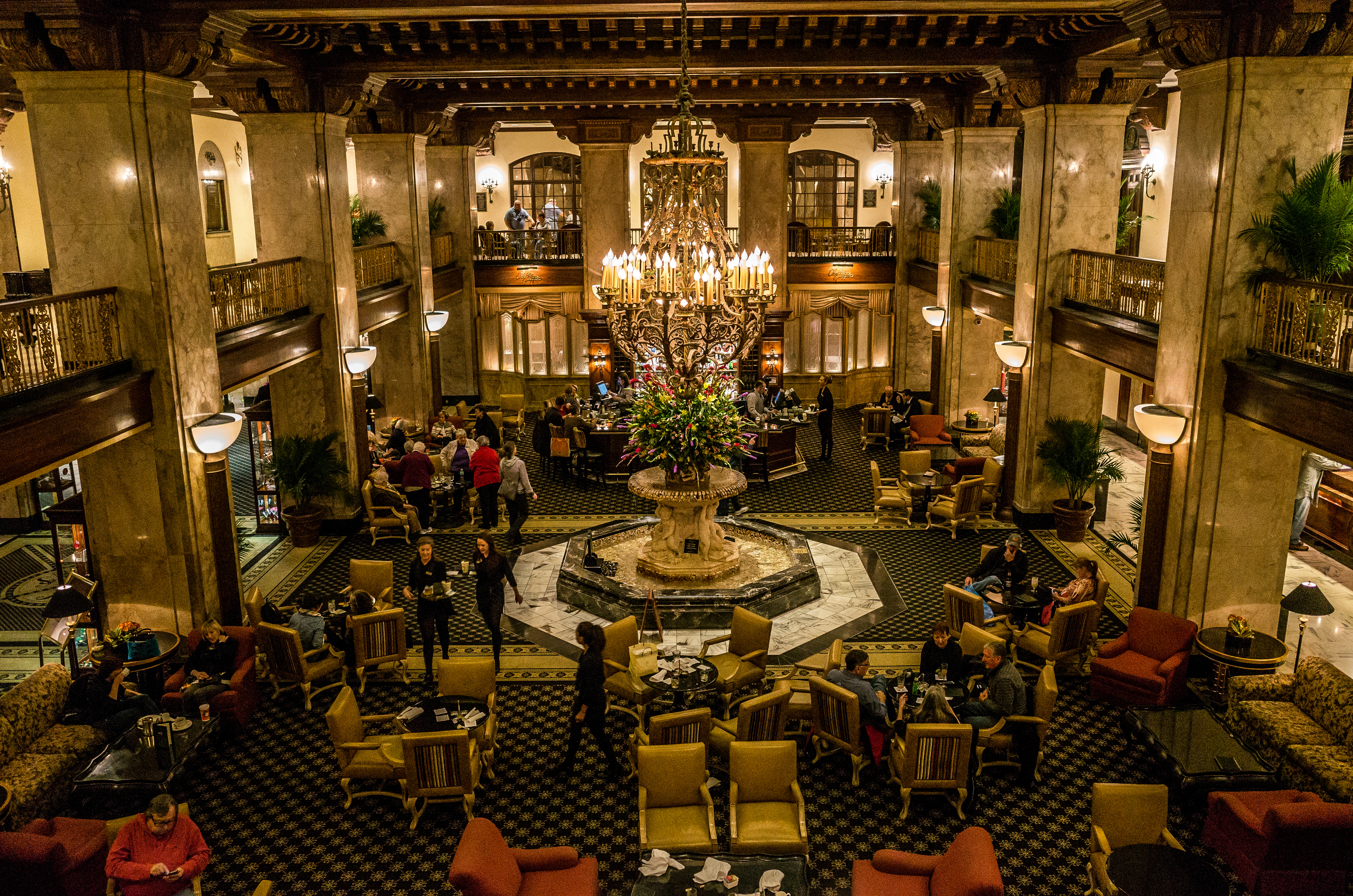
The Peabody Hotel in Memphis was the site of the 2012 Distance Library Services Conference

GCLS also planned, administered, and hosted the biennial Distance Library Services Conference from 1982 to 2018. The conference was an opportunity for librarians to discuss and champion the practice of distance librarianship. Conference proceedings are published and openly available to all interested researchers.

== Collections ==
The CMU Libraries' collections include print books, e-books, print and electronic journals, multimedia, microform, musical recordings, and government documents. The library has been a selective government documents depository since 1958. Most of the library's collections are available for checkout to individuals affiliated with the university, as well as being available for interlibrary loan to other institutions.

The Libraries also offers the Betty A. McDonald Children's Literature Collection, which consists of more than 25,000 picture books, fiction, and nonfiction books for children and young adults. Many of the collection's books have been awarded prestigious children’s literature prizes such as the Caldecott, Newbery, and Coretta Scott King awards.

The library's special collections and archival materials are housed in the Clarke Historical Library.

== Clarke Historical Library ==
The Clarke Historical Library is home to CMU’s distinctive, historical special collections that document many aspects of life in Michigan and the Old Northwest Territory. The Clarke has also developed several other special collections, including the Lucile Clarke Memorial Children’s Library, one of the finest collections of children’s literature in the country; a large collection of Native American material documenting the Anishinaabe people; and the Central Michigan University archives. CMU students, faculty, and staff, as well as outside scholars and community members, are welcome to use the Clarke’s collections and services. The Clarke offers an array of services including walk-in assistance, research appointments, and research copies by request, and we welcome partnering with faculty on planning assignments and teaching with the Clarke’s materials. Among the Clarke’s signature programs is microfilming and digitizing historical Michigan newspapers and making them openly accessible online through the Digital Michigan Newspaper Database. Because of the rarity of the physical collections, they are consulted only in the Clarke’s reading room.

== Michigan Historical Review ==
The Michigan Historical Review is a peer-reviewed, academic journal of Michigan history that was published semiannually by the Clarke Historical Library and the History Department at Central Michigan University between 1974 and 2021. It is currently published by the Historical Society of Michigan.
