= John E. Warriner =

John E. Warriner (January 24, 1907 – 1987) was an American educator and author, best known for his Warriner's English Grammar and Composition. His textbooks, published in many editions over the course of decades in the twentieth century, were considered "one of the best selling series in textbook publishing history." More than 30 million copies of his books have been sold.

== Education ==
Warriner was born in Saginaw, Michigan. He studied at Central State Teachers College in Michigan from 1924 to 1926, was awarded the BA from the University of Michigan in 1930 (where he was class president), and received his MA from Harvard in 1931.

== Career ==
=== As an educator ===
Warriner's first job was to be principal of a high school in Shepherd, Michigan from 1929 to 1931. He later taught at the Montclair State Teachers College in New Jersey from 1931 to 1937. He coached the tennis team there and served as an advisor to the literary club. Warriner moved on to become Head of the English Department at Garden City High School on Long Island in 1937.

=== Author and editor ===
Warriner began creating his own textbook on grammar while still a full-time educator. Harcourt Brace started publishing the books in 1948, and three series of initially six books each (for grades 7–12) resulted: Warriner's English Grammar and Composition, English Workshop, and finally, Composition: Models and Exercises. A 7th volume to Warriner's English Grammar and Composition was added in 1959.

His success in publishing allowed him to retire from teaching school in 1962, at the age of 55; he continued to edit textbooks, working at his publisher's offices in New York. Near the end of his life Warriner lived in both Amagansett, Long Island and on St. Croix, Virgin Islands. He was 80 years old when he died of cancer on July 29, 1987, in St. Croix.

== Theoretical approach ==
Warriner used Standard English as his point of reference, defining it as the English "used by our best educated and most-respected fellow citizens when they are speaking or writing with greatest care."

Warriner was a traditional writer and not a speculative theorist. He published only one critical article on composition, in 1946. His books described principles and techniques of writing, including copious examples, but they were not illustrated or meant to be engaging in terms of graphic design. Warriner devoted sections to the paragraph and developing the argument of an essay, but he also described the art of writing letters, the précis, narrative writing, and the research paper. Later theorists criticized his approach to the paragraph as too formalistic.

One reviewer described Warriner's approach as follows: "The approach to grammar is formal, that is by definition and rule. Levels of usage given are standard, colloquial, and illiterate, and recognition is given to the differences between spoken and written English." Warriner himself once wrote: "Properly used, a textbook is an indispensable aid to the teacher who needs it for the abundance of teaching materials it contains and an important asset to the student who knows how to use it for reference."

== Legacy ==
"Warriner is the name both of a person and an institution," wrote one critic more than a decade after Warriner had died. Millions of students studied composition using his textbooks.

Said another, also after his death, "Arguably, John Warriner's textbooks have influenced writing instruction more than any other series at either the secondary or college level".

Warriner was called "the world's foremost authority on sentence diagramming" by the Detroit Free Press.

Central Michigan University awards a John E. Warriner Scholarship in his honor.

== Publications ==
His Handbook of English (first volume 1948) was a solo-author work, while most of the textbooks were co-edited.

- [Warriner's] English Grammar and Composition: Several different volumes called "Courses"
- Holt Elements of Language
- Holt Traditions: Warriner's Handbook: Several different volumes called "Courses"
- Holt Literature and Language Arts: Several different volumes called "Courses"
- Short Stories: Characters in Conflict
- Co-author with Edward Harlan Webster, Good English Through Practice, 3 vols. DOI: 10.1086/457472
