= E. C. Warriner =

American educator, author, peace activist

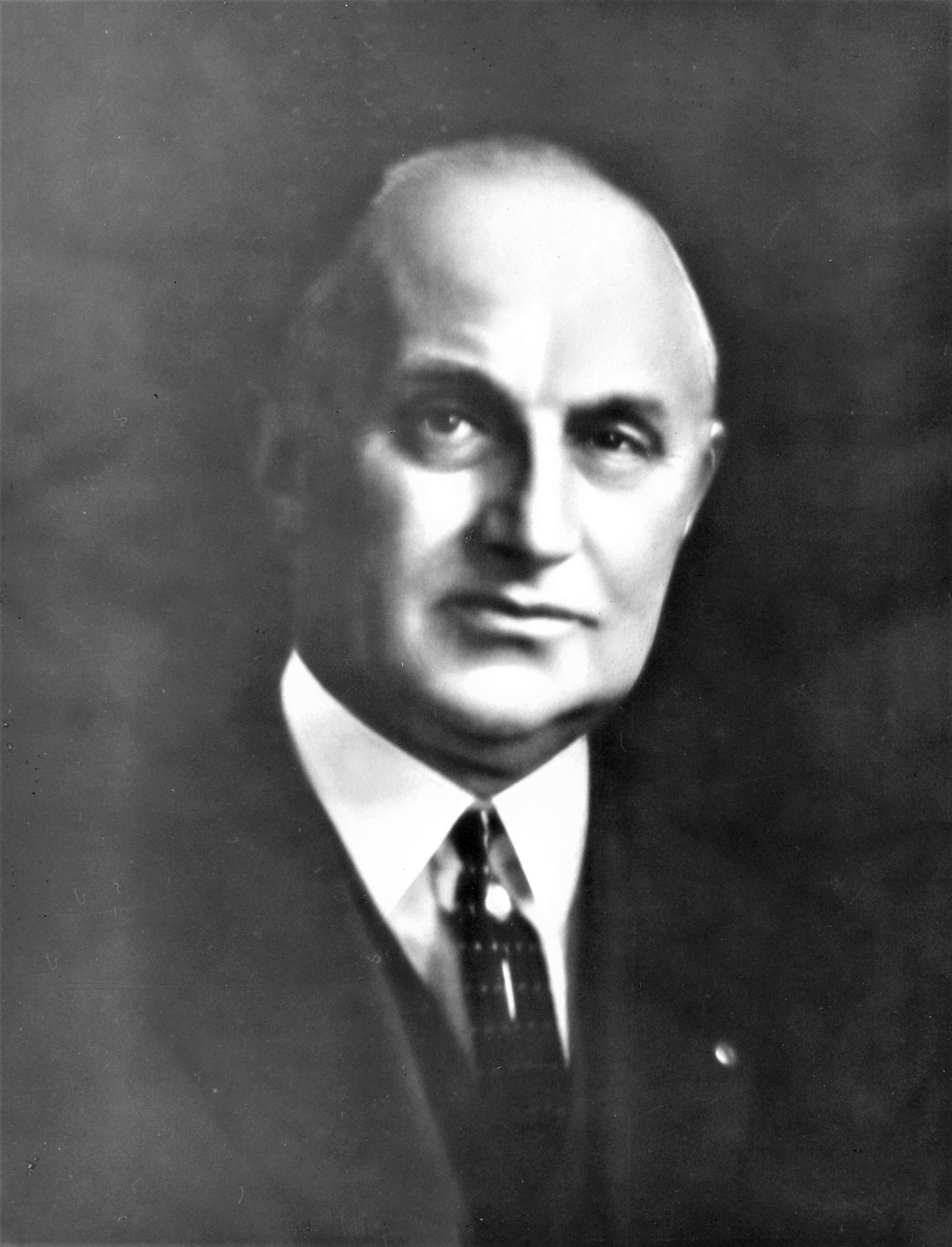

Eugene Clarence Warriner (1866–1945) was a public educator in Michigan who focused on the cultivation of character and public education about the Peace Through Law Movement. Warriner completed his Bachelor of Arts at The University of Michigan and went on to do graduate work at Clark University, Harvard University, and Columbia University. He began his career teaching in grammar schools in Lee County, Illinois for three years before working as the principal of several Michigan high schools between 1892 and 1899. Warriner then served as Superintendent of Public Schools of Saginaw for 18 years. While there, he was elected to the board of directors for the National Education Association to represent Michigan school districts. Afterward, Warriner served as the 4th President of Central State Normal School (now Central Michigan University) from 1918 to 1939. He also served as the administrator for the Charlevoix County Teacher's Institute in the latter half of his life. Warriner's papers are held by the Clarke Historical Library.

== Philosophy of education ==
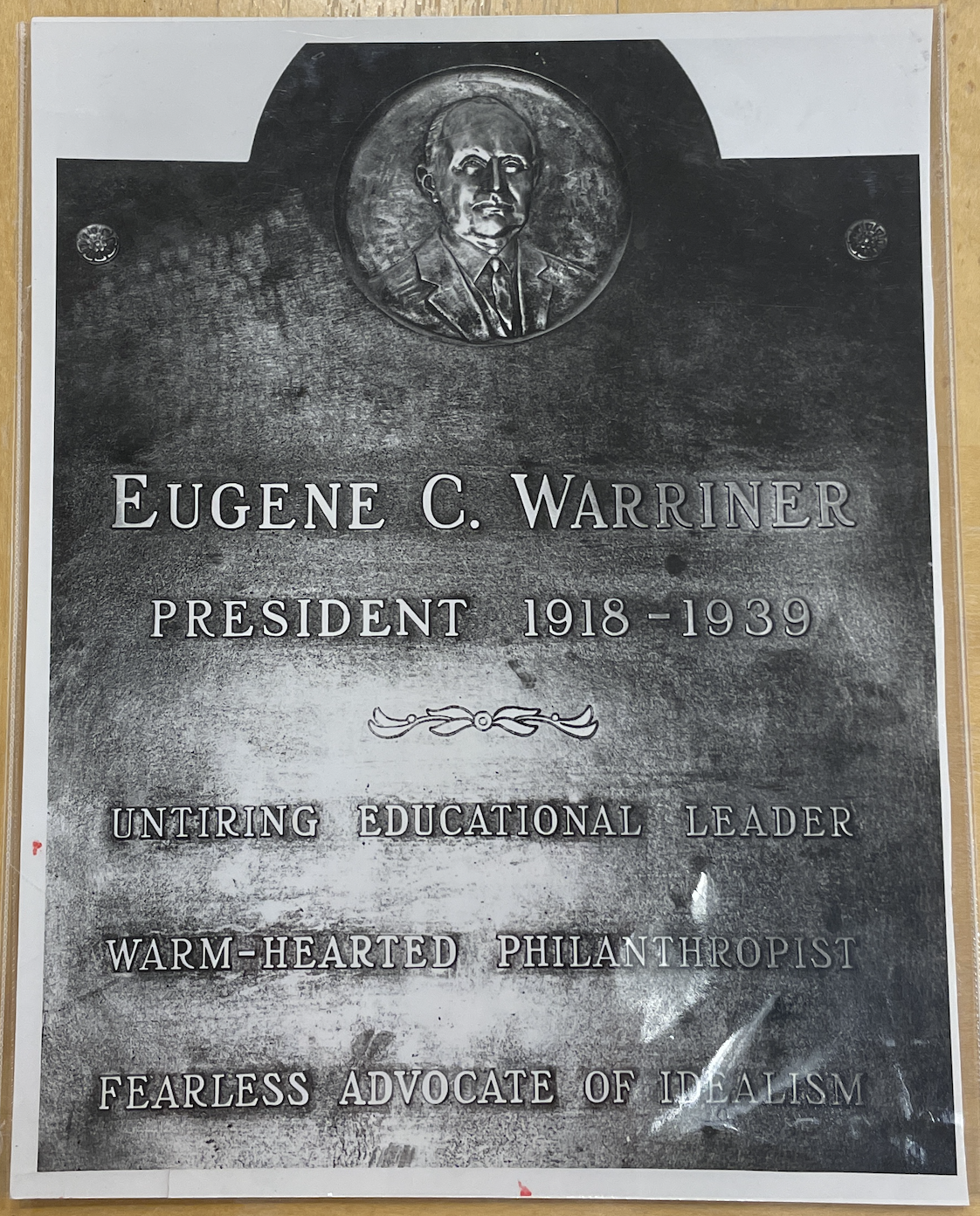
Plaque dedicated to E. C. Warriner, recognizing him as an "Untiring Educational Leader, Warm-Hearted Philanthropist, and Fearless Advocate of Idealism"

=== Literature and character education ===
Warriner wrote the 1913 text The Teaching of English Classics in the Grammar Grades, published by Riverside Press (a division of Houghton Mifflin) and used widely in U.S. schools at the time. Warriner published the text when he was the Superintendent of Saginaw Public Schools. The Teaching of English Classics, not only included classic fiction such as Charles Dickens' A Christmas Carol, but also American contributions such as Abraham Lincoln's Gettysburg Address. A lover of literature, and a believer in its power to cultivate character, Warriner published the widely used text for the purpose of helping the young people of America love literature. His son, John E. Warriner, wrote the popular text Warriner's English Grammar and Composition. E. C. Warriner, also renowned for his generosity and philanthropy, promoted education in this way. One newspaper recounts how Warriner and his wife donated a library full of books to an event hosted by the Girl Scouts of the USA in the hopes of promoting both literature and education within the girls' formative years.

=== Sport and character education ===
Warriner viewed sports as important crucibles of character—especially honesty—and was instrumental in establishing formal rules for school athletics.

=== Peace activism and education ===
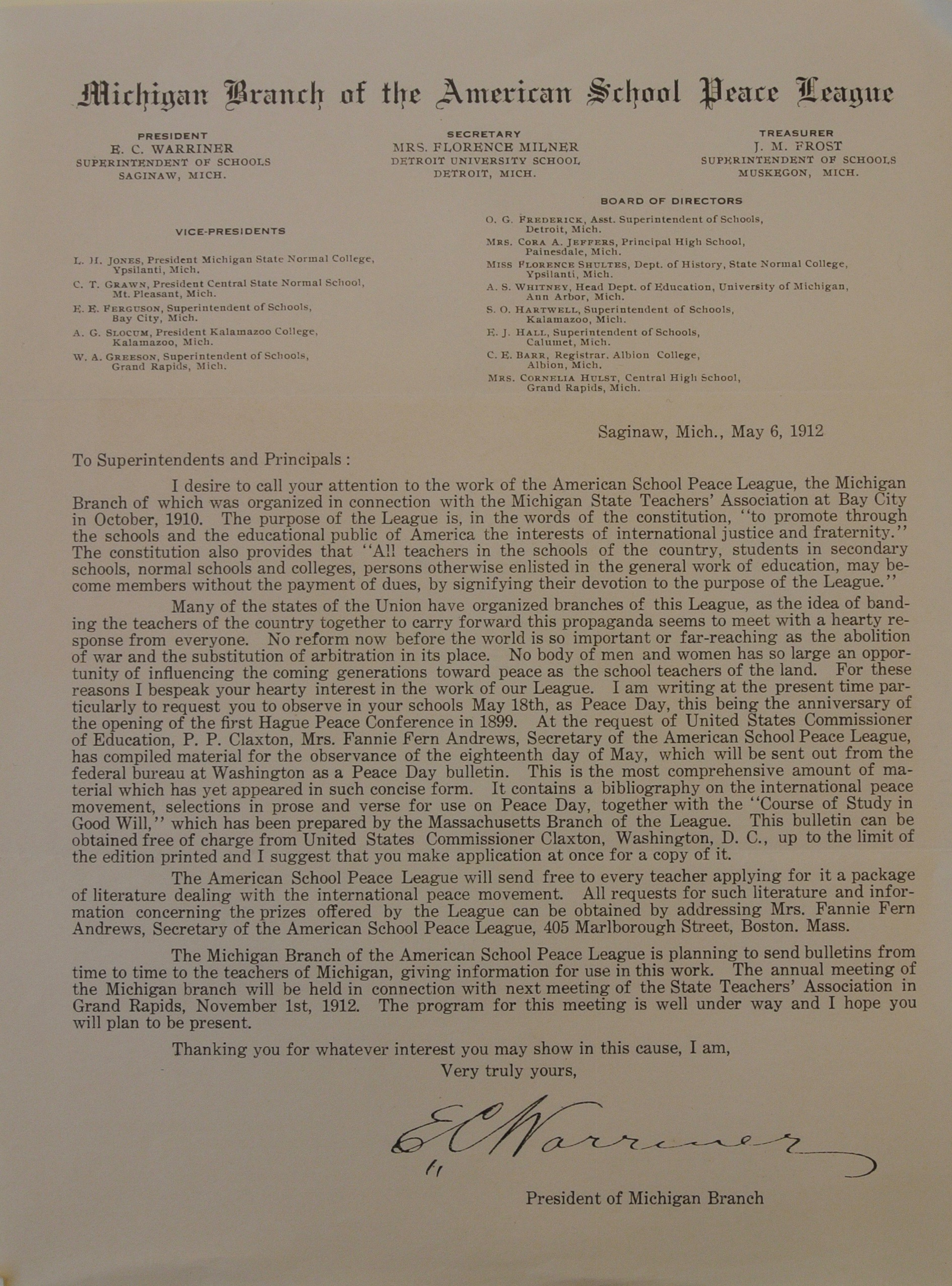
Letter from E. C. Warriner, President of the Michigan Branch of the American School Peace League, urging its members to celebrate Peace Day as a means of educating students about non-violent dispute resolution through the newly established Permanent Court of Arbitration (in The Hague, Netherlands)

Warriner was a leader in the Peace through Education Movement that blossomed after the Hague Conventions of 1899 and 1907 from which emerged international treaties which aimed at the promotion of peace through law and international organization. Central to the Peace through Education Movement in the United States was the Celebration of Peace Day on May 18, chosen because it was the day on which the 1899 Hague Peace Conference opened.

Warriner was founder and President of the Michigan Branch of the American School Peace League on October 28, 1910. He conducted the meeting at the 99th semi-annual Teachers Association of Gratiot County. As such, he urged public school teachers in Michigan to educate its young people about the "new world order" and international organization aimed at peace that were ushered in by the early Hague Peace Conferences (of 1899 and 1907). Warriner spoke publicly on peace prior to the U.S. entry into the Great War and was engaged in a public debate with Governor Chase Osborn about the propriety of introducing rifle shooting in schools, which the Governor endorsed.

=== Equity in education ===
Warriner was a strong advocate for equity in education, and specifically, in educational materials. He spoke at both Joint School Superintendent meetings and later, at the State Teachers' Association on the disparities between educational opportunity in rural areas and urban areas of Michigan. He noted that the urban areas were offered more reliable, up-to-date, and consistent textbooks, in particular, and that the successes of students residing in rural areas were not thoroughly considered. Warriner argued that children in rural areas deserve the same opportunities and quality materials as those in urban areas, and that the educational boards must not discriminate between geological region in Michigan schools.

=== History in education ===
Warriner strongly believed in American history being taught in schools. He wrote an article stating its importance and impact. Warriner believed that American history was a vital component of becoming an intellectual citizen, which was the whole point of education.

== Women's suffrage ==
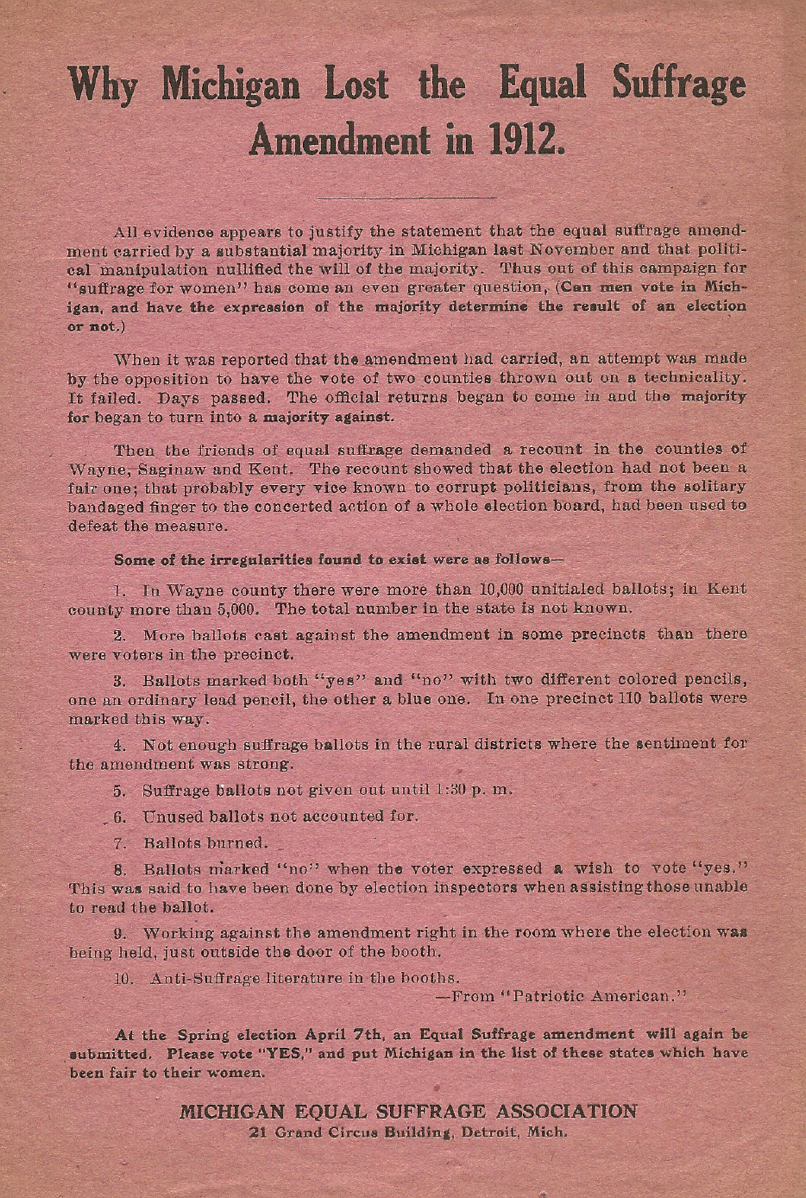
1912 Flyer published by the Michigan Equal Suffrage League, of which Warriner was a member. The flyer claims that the State referendum granting women the right to vote failed because of election fraud.

In addition to supporting non-violent dispute resolution, Warriner also supported the enfranchisement of women prior to the enactment of the 19th Amendment. He was a member of the Michigan Equal Suffrage Association and a President of its local chapter. Women's suffrage appeared as a Michigan referendum in 1912. It failed, and in 1913 the Michigan Equal Suffrage Association claimed that the failure was due to election fraud. In a speech delivered in 1914, Warriner stated "I am fully persuaded in my own mind of the justice of the demand of the women for a right to vote."

== Interest in classical philosophy ==
A student of the classics, Warriner wrote an essay on the ideas of Socrates. He also spoke on the importance of Greek Philosophy.

== Writings ==
Warriner wrote essays and contributed to various journals while Superintendent of Public Schools of Saginaw and President of Central State Normal School.

== Impact ==
The state school board hosted an official naming of the Central State Teachers College administration building. The board named it Warriner Hall in honor of the retiring president in June 1939. It still stands at Central Michigan University, with its original name, housing the president's office and the academic administration.

Since 2015, the International Peace Flag (also known as the "Pro Concordia Labor" flag) has been raised outside of Warriner Hall, the main administration building at Central Michigan University. The flag is raised to educate the public about Warriner's peace through education work, and the peace movement of which he was a part. The annual raising has been planned to coincide with Earth Day since 2020.
