= Michigan Historical Review =

American history journal

The Michigan Historical Review is a semiannual peer-reviewed academic journal of American history published by the Historical Society of Michigan. It was established in 1974 as The Great Lakes Review before obtaining its current name in 1986. The journal was formerly published by Central Michigan University until August 1, 2021, when it moved to the Historical Society of Michigan. The journal is abstracted and index in America: History and Life, Arts & Humanities Citation Index, Current Contents/Arts & Humanities, International Bibliography of Periodical Literature, and Expanded Academic ASAP. It is available in paper format from the Historical Society of Michigan.
