= Warriner's English Grammar and Composition =

American textbook series

- First Course through Fifth Course; Complete Course
- Author: John E. Warriner
- Discipline: English grammar and composition
- Publisher: Harcourt Brace Jovanovich
- Published: 1946
- No. of books: Six

Warriner's English Grammar and Composition is a series of textbooks on English grammar and composition by John E. Warriner, consisting initially of six books targeted at grades 6 through 12, in numerous editions, with publication beginning in 1946 and a 7th book added in 1959. Last revised in 1981, the series was still in print at the time of Warriner's death in 1987. Publisher Harcourt Brace Jovanovich described it as "one of the best selling series in textbook publishing history", with over 30 million copies sold.

Books of the series have been published in large-print, Braille, audiobook, and e-book editions.

== History ==
John E. Warriner (c. 1907–1987) earned a Bachelor's in English in 1930 from the University of Michigan, followed by a Master's from Harvard. He then taught at New Jersey State Teachers College, and later Garden City High School.

In 1942 or 1943, Warriner was approached by a publisher's sales representative about revising a grammar book dating from 1898. Warriner instead began writing chapters for a new book, which was published by Harcourt Brace as Warriner's Handbook of English, aimed at grades 9 and 10. This book was followed by a volume aimed at 11th and 12th graders. By 1956, the series had grown to six books, with a seventh added in 1959, spanning grades 6 through 12.

Warriner retired from teaching in 1962, and spent the following years working at Harcourt's offices a few days a week, and traveling to promote the series. He last revised the series in 1981.
