= Central Michigan University =

Public university in Mount Pleasant, Michigan, US

- Former names: Central Michigan Normal School and Business Institute (1892–1895); Central Michigan Normal School (1895–1959)
- Motto: Sapientia, Virtus, Amicitia (Latin)
- Motto in English: "Wisdom, Virtue, Friendship"
- Type: Public research university
- Established: 1892; 134 years ago
- Accreditation: HLC
- Endowment: $284.3 million (2025)
- President: Neil MacKinnon
- Provost: Paula Lancaster
- Faculty: 1,017
- Administrative staff: 1,441
- Students: 14,423 (fall 2023)
- Undergraduates: 10,079
- Postgraduates: 4,344
- Location: Mount Pleasant, Michigan, United States; 43°35′23″N 84°46′39″W
- Campus: 480 acres (1.9 km^{2}); Distant town
- Other campuses: Clinton Township (Macomb County); Dearborn; Grand Rapids; Lansing; Saginaw; Southfield; Traverse City; Troy
- Newspaper: Central Michigan Life
- Colors: Maroon and gold
- Nickname: Chippewas
- Sporting affiliations: NCAA Division I FBS – MAC
- Website: cmich.edu

Central Michigan University (CMU, CMICH) is a public research university in Mount Pleasant, Michigan, United States. It was established in 1892 as a private normal school and became a state institution in 1895. CMU is one of the eight research universities in Michigan and is classified among "R2: Doctoral Universities – High research activity". It has more than 14,000 students on its Mount Pleasant campus. CMU offers 200 academic programs at the undergraduate, master's, specialist, and doctoral levels. The Central Michigan Chippewas compete in the NCAA Division I Mid-American Conference in six men's and ten women's sports.

== History ==
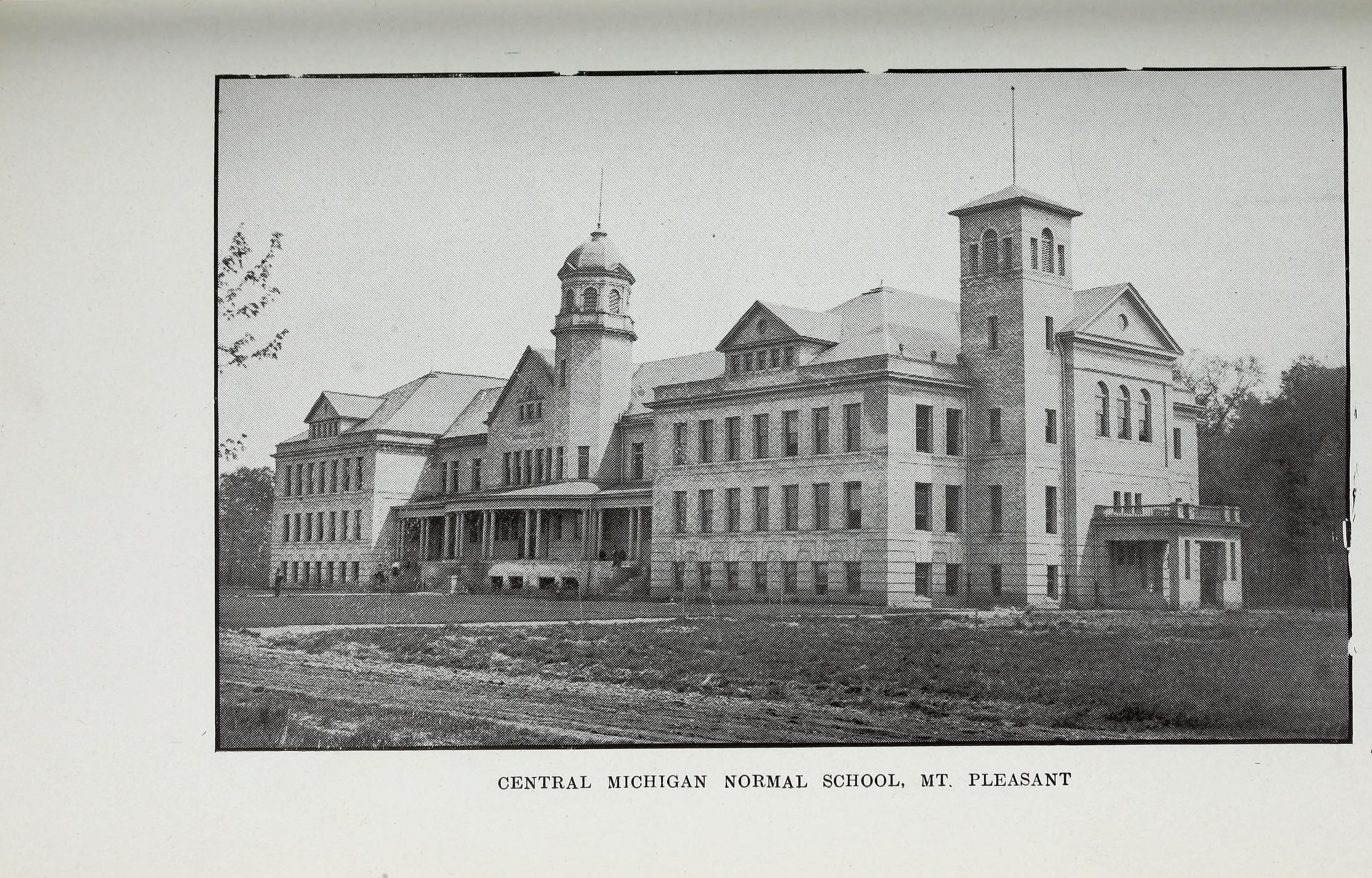
Central Michigan Normal School (1905)

CMU opened in 1892 as the Central Michigan Normal School and Business Institute. Prof. Charles F. R. Bellows, a University of Michigan graduate, became the founding principal of the school in June 1892.

For the first year, 31 students attended classes in the Carpenter Building in downtown Mount Pleasant. Bellows surveyed the future location of the campus and was involved in the construction of the original Main Building, which opened in September 1893. Within the first two years, land was acquired, and a $10,000 school building was constructed.

During Bellows' tenure, he organized a separate Conservatory for Music through his own funds, which became incorporated into the Normal in 1900. He continued to teach as a professor and spoke to teacher groups throughout the State. Bellows also led an advertising effort for the school in order to gain more students.

In 1895, the Michigan State Board of Education assumed control of the school, renaming it Central Michigan Normal School. Bellows resigned from Central in the following year. He returned to Ypsilanti, Michigan in 1902 to join the faculty of the Michigan State Normal College (now Eastern Michigan University).

By 1918, the campus consisted of 25 acres with five buildings. On June 1, 1959, with 40 buildings now standing on the 235-acre campus and an enrollment of 4,500 students, Central was renamed Central Michigan University. The designation reflected growth in the complexity of the school's academic offerings as well as its physical growth in the post-war period. Enrollment tripled over the next 10 years.

In response to the need for doctors to practice in rural areas, CMU opened its medical school in 2010.

=== Presidents ===
- Charles F. R. Bellows (1892–1896)
- Charles McKenny (1896–1899)
- Charles Grawn (1900–1918)
- E. C. Warriner (1918–1939)
- Charles L. Anspach (1939–1959)
- Judson Foust (1959–1968)
- William Beaty Boyd (1968–1975)
- Harold Abel (1975–1985)
- Arthur Emmett Ellis (1985–1988)
- Edward B. Jakubauskas (1988–1992)
- Leonard E. Plachta (1992–2000)
- Michael Rao (2000–2009)
- Kathy Wilbur (2009–2010)
- George Ross (2010–2018)
- Robert Davies (2018–2024)
- Neil J. MacKinnon (2024-present)

== Organization and administration ==
Central Michigan University is governed by a board of trustees, whose eight members are appointed by the Governor of Michigan with advice and consent of the Michigan Senate for terms of eight years. The board appoints and reviews the President of Central Michigan University, currently Neil J. MacKinnon. Paula Lancaster was appointed as Provost and Executive Vice President of Central Michigan University on February 1, 2025, having served as interim provost and executive vice president since September 10, 2024.

== Academics ==
=== Undergraduate admissions ===
Undergraduate admissions statistics
- 2021 entering class
- Admit rate: 77.1%
- Yield rate: 13.4%

Test scores middle 50%
- SAT Total: 1010–1223 (among 57% of FTFs)
- ACT Composite: 19–26 (among 10% of FTFs)

CMU is considered "selective" by U.S. News & World Report. For the Class of 2025 (enrolled fall 2021), CMU received 18,517 applications and accepted 14,273 (77.1%). Of those accepted, 1,909 enrolled, a yield rate (the percentage of accepted students who choose to attend the university) of 13.4%. CMU's freshman retention rate is 77%, with 61.7% going on to graduate within six years.

Of the 57% of the incoming freshman class who submitted SAT scores; the middle 50 percent Composite scores were 1010–1223. Of the 10% of enrolled freshmen in 2021 who submitted ACT scores; the middle 50 percent Composite score was between 19.25 and 26.

Central Michigan University has seen a dramatic decline in enrollment in recent years. Between 2012 and 2022, CMU had a 46% drop in total enrollment.

Fall First-Time Freshman Statistics
	2021	2020	2019	2018	2017
Applicants	18,517	19,396	16,411	17,858	19,021
Admits	14,273	13,320	11,408	12,293	12,887
Admit rate	77.1	68.7	69.5	68.8	67.8
Enrolled	1,909	2,088	2,473	2,732	3,076
Yield rate	13.4	15.7	21.7	22.2	23.7
ACT composite* (out of 36)	19.25–26 (10%^{†})	20–26 (19%^{†})	20–26 (23%^{†})	20–27 (24%^{†})	20–27 (43%^{†})
SAT composite* (out of 1600)	1010–1223 (57%^{†})	1010–1210 (93%^{†})	990–1190 (89%^{†})	1000–1200 (86%^{†})	1010–1200 (78%^{†})
* middle 50% range^{†} percentage of first-time freshmen who chose to submit

=== Academic divisions ===
Academic rankings

National
- Forbes: 408
- U.S. News & World Report: 283 (tie)
- Washington Monthly: 206

Global
- U.S. News & World Report: 1296 (tie)

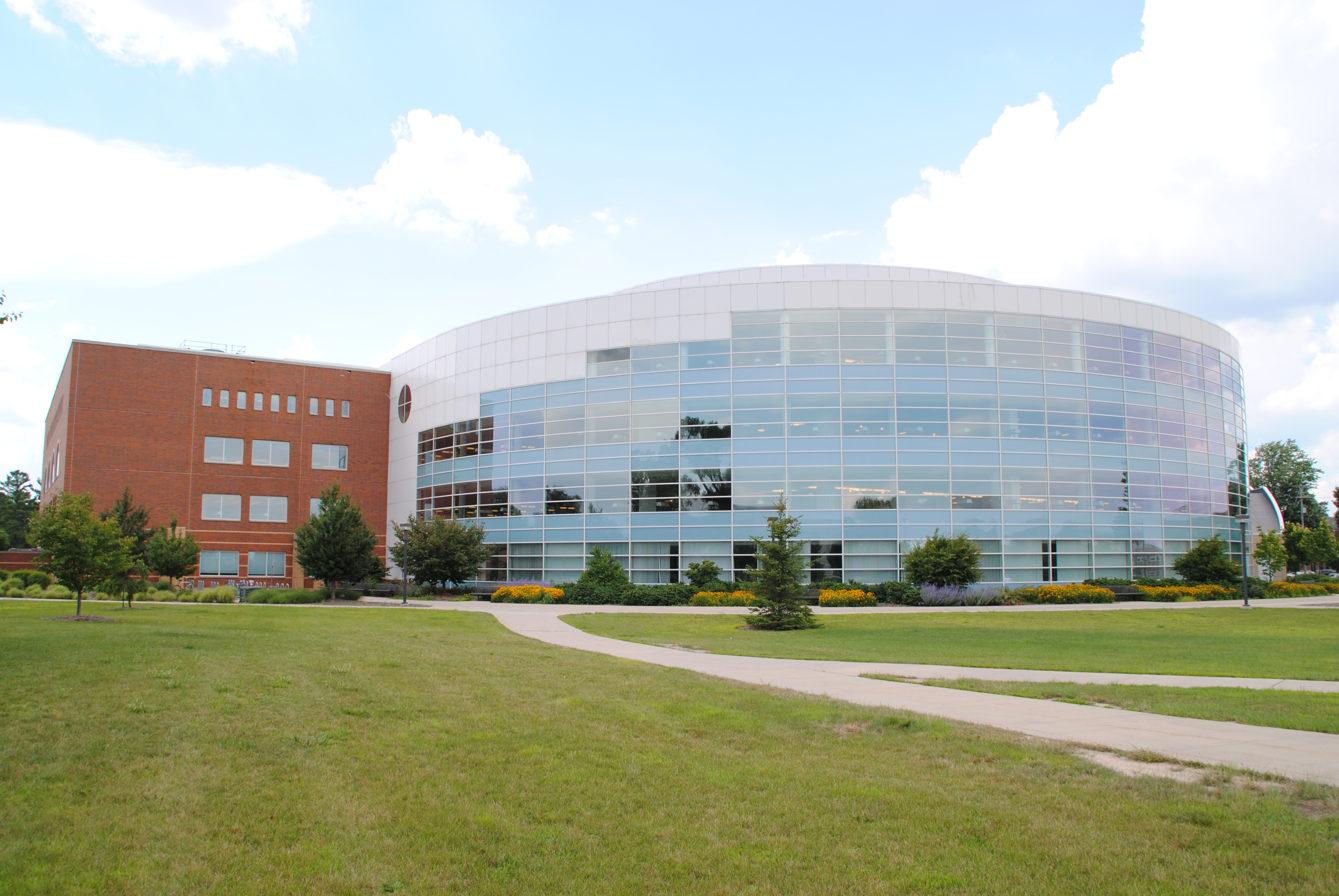
Charles V. Park Library at Central Michigan University

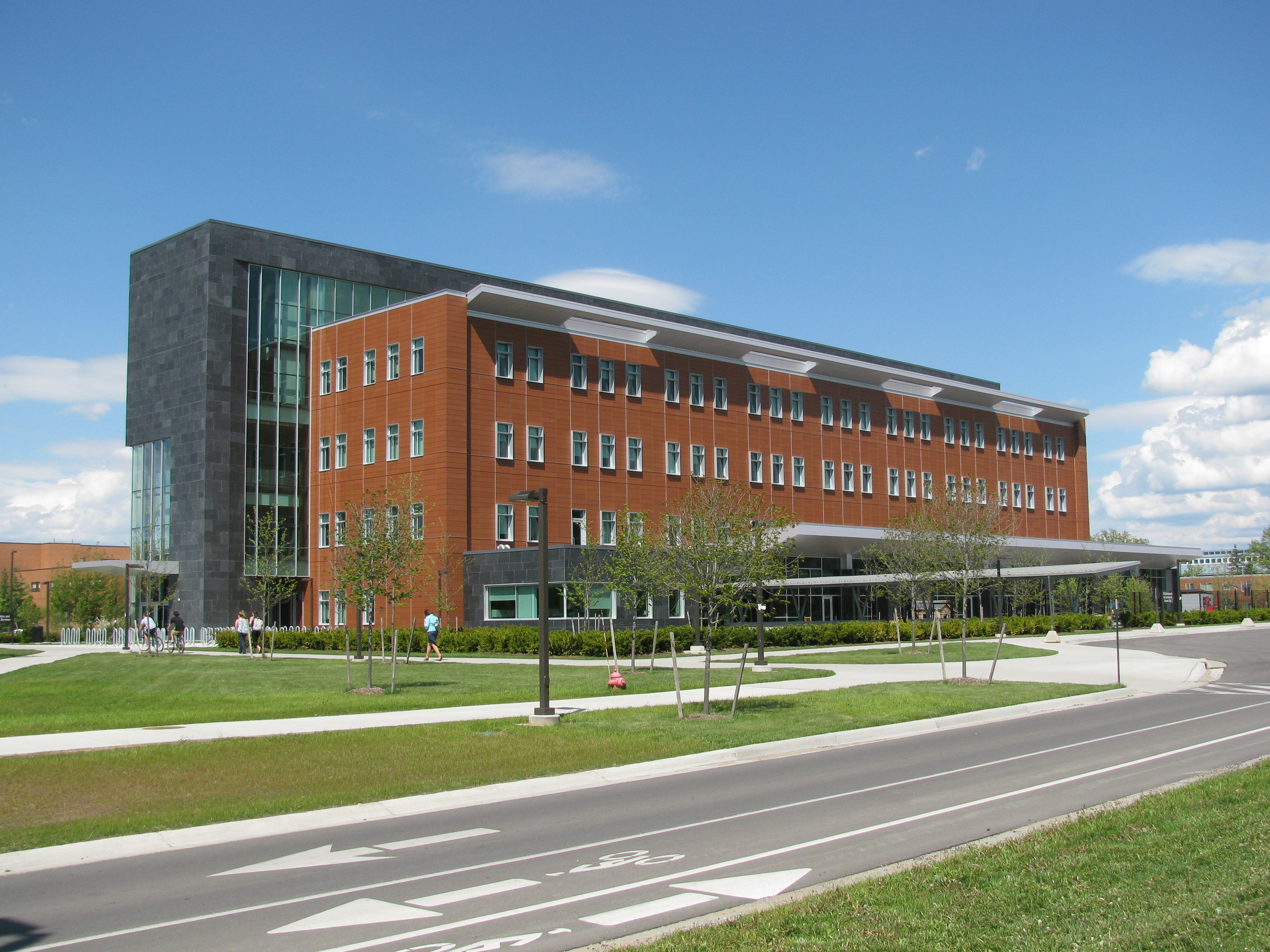
Education and Human Services Building at Central Michigan University

CMU has eight academic divisions:

- College of Business Administration
- College of the Arts and Media
- College of Education and Human Services
- Herbert H. and Grace A. Dow College of Health Professions
- College of Liberal Arts and Social Sciences
- Covenant HealthCare College of Medicine
- College of Science and Engineering
- College of Graduate Studies

Academic work and research on campus are supported by the resources and services of the Central Michigan University Libraries. The university also owns and operates the Brooks Astronomical Observatory.

The university's neuroscience program was named undergraduate program of the year in 2013 by the Society for Neuroscience.

Its most popular undergraduate majors, by 2021 graduates, were:

Psychology (207)
Exercise Science and Kinesiology (182)
Community Organization and Advocacy (155)
Marketing/Marketing Management (125)
Cell/Cellular and Molecular Biology (104)
Child Development (100)

The Central Michigan University College of Graduate Studies provides over 70 graduate degree programs at the Master's, Specialist, or Doctoral levels.

As of 2024, the university supported 69 public charter schools serving 29,000 students across Michigan through its Governor John Engler Center for Charter Schools.

=== Research ===
According to the National Science Foundation, CMU spent $15.6 million on research and development in 2018.

== Student life ==
Student body composition as of May 2, 2022
Race and ethnicity	Total
White	75%
Black	11%
Hispanic	5%
Other (Note: Other consists of Multiracial Americans & those who prefer to not say.)	5%
Asian	1%
Foreign national	1%
Native American	1%
Economic diversity
Low-income (Note: The percentage of students who received an income-based federal Pell Grant intended for low-income students.)	36%
Affluent (Note: The percentage of students who are a part of the American middle class at the bare minimum.)	64%

=== Residence life ===
Central Michigan University is home to 21 on-campus residence halls, arranged in four areas throughout the campus. In 2006, the 21st and 22nd residence halls on campus opened in the East complex. In 2019, the university decommissioned and demolished Barnes Hall, which was the oldest serving residence hall and the only one not physically connected to any other. In 2022, the university closed the North Residence Halls.

- North Residence Halls (unoccupied): Larzelere, Trout, Calkins, Robinson
- South Residence Halls: Beddow, Merrill, Thorpe, Sweeney
- East Residence Halls: Saxe, Herrig, Woldt, Emmons; Celani and Fabiano
- The Towers: Carey, Cobb, Troutman and Wheeler ("The Original Towers"), Campbell, Kesseler and Kulhavi ("The New Towers")

It was announced by the university on March 3, 2022, that Larzelere, Trout, Calkins, and Robinson would be closed during the 2022 Fall semester due to semester enrollment estimates. The university has not since reopened these halls.

The majority of CMU residence hall rooms are two-bedroom suites designed for 4 people. Three of the Original Towers (Cobb, Troutman and Wheeler), nine-story high-rise residence halls designed primarily for freshmen, feature one-bedroom suites for three or four people. The fourth of the Original Towers, Carey, was renovated to double-occupancy rooms in 2020 as a means of managing decreased enrollment. The New Towers, as well as Fabiano and Celani, are designed primarily for upperclassmen, and are four-bedroom suites. Residents of Robinson, Carey, Celani, Fabiano, Campbell, Kesseler and Kulhavi pay an additional charge over the standard room and board rate.

Each of the three remaining communities, East, South, and Towers is connected to one of three Residential Restaurants. The Towers features the Eatery, South features Merrill Virtual Dining Hall, and the East Complex features Dine&Connect. Both East and Towers have convenient store styled markets that are open until midnight.

Some residence halls are designated as official Living Learning Communities, associated with a particular academic department, allowing students who choose to live there opportunities for study and collaboration with other students from similar programs.

- Beddow Hall – Business
- Herrig Hall – Music
- Emmons Hall – Health Professions
- Woldt Hall – Science and Engineering
- Sweeney Hall – Education and Human Services
- Thorpe Hall – Honors Program
- Calkins Hall – Leader Advancement Scholars & Public Service Residential Community
- Troutman Hall – Multicultural Advancement/Cofer Scholars
- Cobb Hall – Public Service
- Kulhavi Hall – Transfer Students

CMU offers only co-ed residence halls, with Sweeney Hall the last to convert, from females only, in the fall of 2010.

Construction began on two more buildings, Celani and Fabiano, near the East Quad in the spring of 2005. The buildings are somewhat similar in design to the New Towers which opened in 2003. On December 1, 2005, one of the buildings was named The Ben and Marion Celani Residence hall to recognize the generosity of Detroit area businessman Thomas Celani and his wife Vicki. On April 20, 2006, the remaining building was named the Fabiano Family Residence Hall, recognizing their contribution to the school. John S. Fabiano served on the board of trustees 1999–2004, and also owns the Fabiano Brothers Inc, an alcohol distribution company. These two new halls opened for the fall semester of 2006, along with a new Residential Restaurant to serve the residents of the six East Area halls.

=== Greek life ===
CMU recognizes academic, social, and professional Greek organizations which comply with university rules and regulations such as its anti-hazing policies. Currently, in the social realm, there consists of 9 fraternities and 11 sororities. Other Greek life organizations that pertain to honoCe, degrees, and multicultural backgrounds have formed as well throughout the years. Each is unique to their own roots, and provides a great networking opportunity for students at the university. There have been a number of incidents with fraternities on campus, including a controversy where one fraternity allegedly used KKK outfits and traditions to rush.

=== Campus safety ===
On March 2, 2018, 19-year-old student James Eric Davis Jr. shot and killed his mother and father when they came to campus to take him home for spring break. After the shooting, Davis fled and the campus was placed on lockdown. Around 15 hours later, police arrested him and took him to a local hospital. The incident disrupted the travel plans of students and campus activities for several days. Davis was charged with two counts of murder and one count of unlawful possession of a firearm used to commit murder, and was later determined to be not guilty by reason of insanity and committed to a psychiatric institution.

=== Media ===
The campus' student-run newspaper is Central Michigan Life. The paper is published every Thursday during the academic year and www.cm-life.com, which receives 1 million page views per year, is updated daily. CM Life was named one of the top three non-daily newspapers in the nation for 2007, 2018, 2019 by the Society of Professional Journalists. It also was named the best college newspaper in Division I in Michigan eight of the past 10 years. CM Life has been named winner of the National Pacemaker Awards by Associated Collegiate Press in 1975, 1976, 1978, 1979, 1989, 1990, 2001, 2002, 2005, 2007, 2009, 2013, 2014, 2015 and 2016, 2019. It also was a finalist for the first time for an online Pacemaker in 2010. CM-Life has come in first place for the Best College Media Company in the nation seven years in a row (2014, 2015, 2016, 2017, 2018, 2019, 2020) by College Media Business and Advertising Managers organization.

There are also two student-run college radio stations, FM 91.5 WMHW-FM and FM 101.1, a student produced newscast, News Central 34, and a student-run college television station MHTV. In 2005, a student-operated music label called Moore Media Records (MMR) was established.

In addition, the university owns and operates WCMU-TV, the region's PBS station, and WCMU-FM, the NPR affiliate. Both stations serve most of Northern Michigan, including the eastern Upper Peninsula, through a network of repeater stations.

Also established in 2003 is White Pine Music, the recording label of the CMU School of Music.

On February 2, 2008, Central Michigan University's online magazine, Grand Central Magazine, was launched. Currently updated weekly, the magazine is run through CMU's Department of Journalism and features magazine style features from the world of sports, entertainment, style, technology and travel.

In September 2022, Central Michigan University's Department of Fashion Merchandising and Design launched Verge Magazine, a fashion and lifestyle magazine that is entirely run by Central Michigan students. The magazine is offered in a digital format through the Verge Magazine website, as well as physical copies that are available for purchase. As of December 2023, Verge magazine has released seven issues and over five hundred physical copies have sold.

== Athletics ==
The school's athletics programs are affiliated with NCAA Division I. CMU was a member of the Interstate Intercollegiate Athletic Conference from 1950 to 1970. Almost all Central Michigan teams compete in the Mid-American Conference; the one exception until recently was the women's lacrosse team, newly elevated from club to full varsity status for the 2015–2016 school year. It competed in the Southern Conference for a time, but joined the MAC for the 2021 season.

The football program is known for producing players such as Antonio Brown and Joe Staley. Before moving up to Division I, the football team won its second NCAA Division II national championship in 1974 by defeating the Delaware Fightin' Blue Hens 54 to 14. Notable Division I years include 1994, 2006, 2007, and 2009 when they won the MAC Football Championship Game. In 2009, they finished the season ranked #23 in the final AP Poll and #24 in the final Coaches Poll marking the first time that a CMU football team had ever ended the season ranked in the Top 25 at the NCAA Division I-FBS level. Since 2014, the football program has made a college bowl game, and continues to see its players set MAC records yearly.

Frequently defeating both the Michigan Wolverines and the Michigan State Spartans in dual meets, CMU's wrestling team won its 10th straight MAC championship and seventh straight conference tournament title in 2008. The Chippewas tied for seventh at the NCAA Championships, scoring a school-record 69 points. Four individuals earned All-America honors.

The women's basketball program has excelled to new levels. In 2018, the team made its way to the Sweet Sixteen of the NCAA Division I women's basketball tournament. The team beat the LSU Lady Tigers and the Ohio State Buckeyes in the first two rounds, only to lose to the Oregon Ducks in the third.

In 1958, the men's swimming and diving team was runner-up to the North Central at the second annual NAIA national meet, which was held in Muncie, Indiana.

In May 2020, the university discontinued its men's track and field program as part of budget cuts caused by the coronavirus pandemic. In June of the same year, CMU announced it had received a waiver from the NCAA Division I Council that would allow the football program to remain in the Football Bowl Subdivision and give the school two years to bring the total number of men's programs up to FBS compliance.

== Notable alumni ==
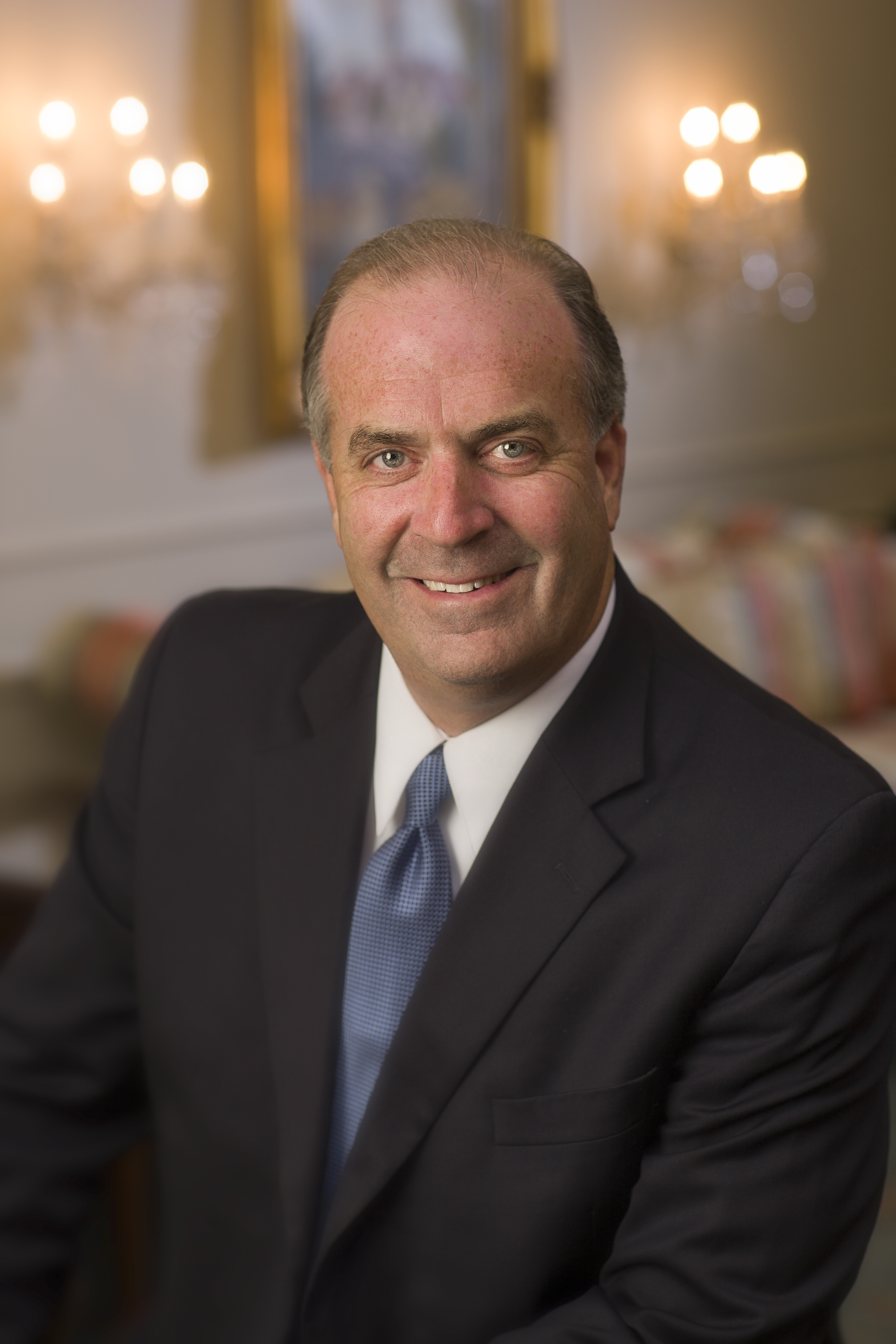
U.S. representative Dan Kildee

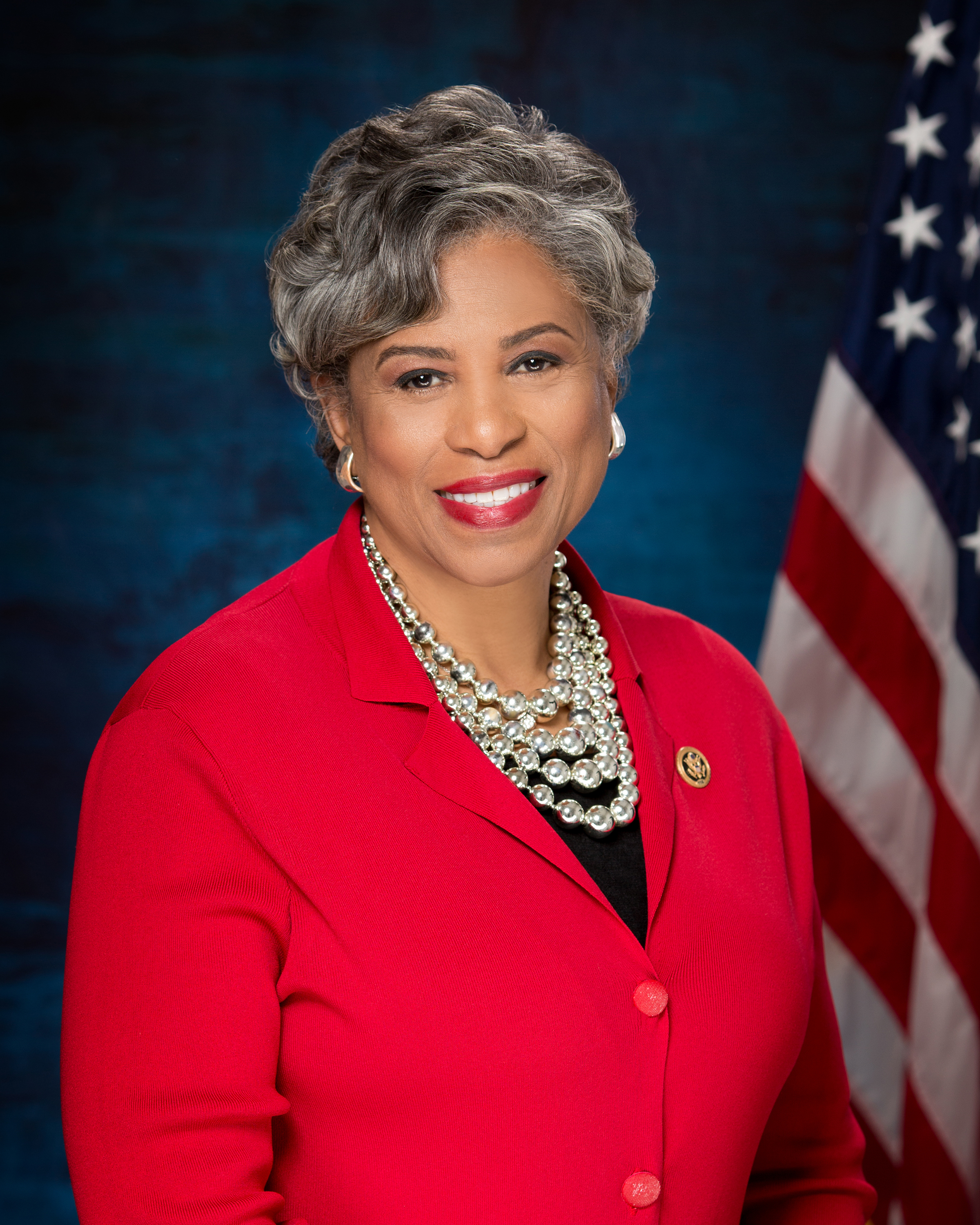
U.S. representative Brenda Lawrence

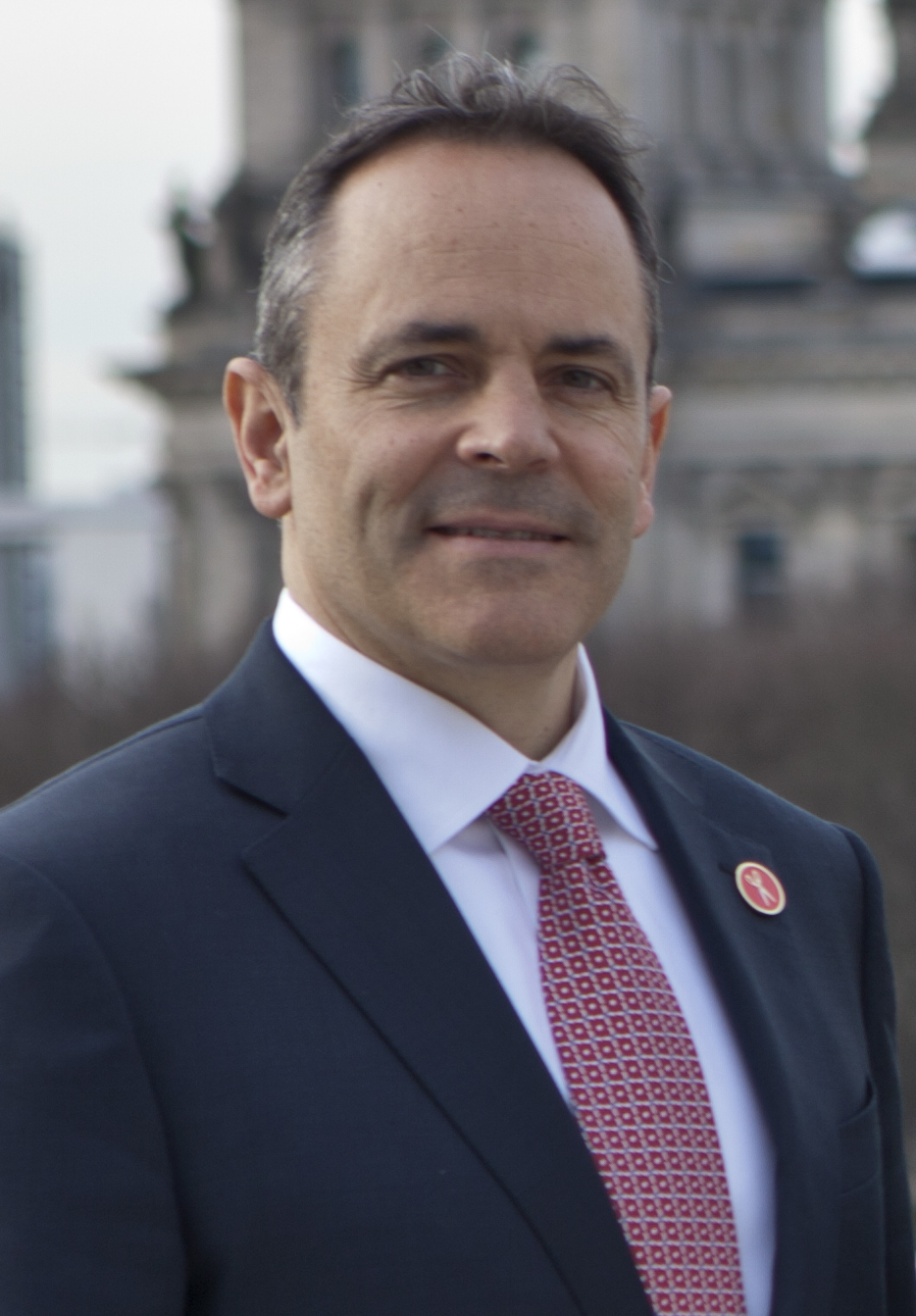
62nd governor of Kentucky Matt Bevin

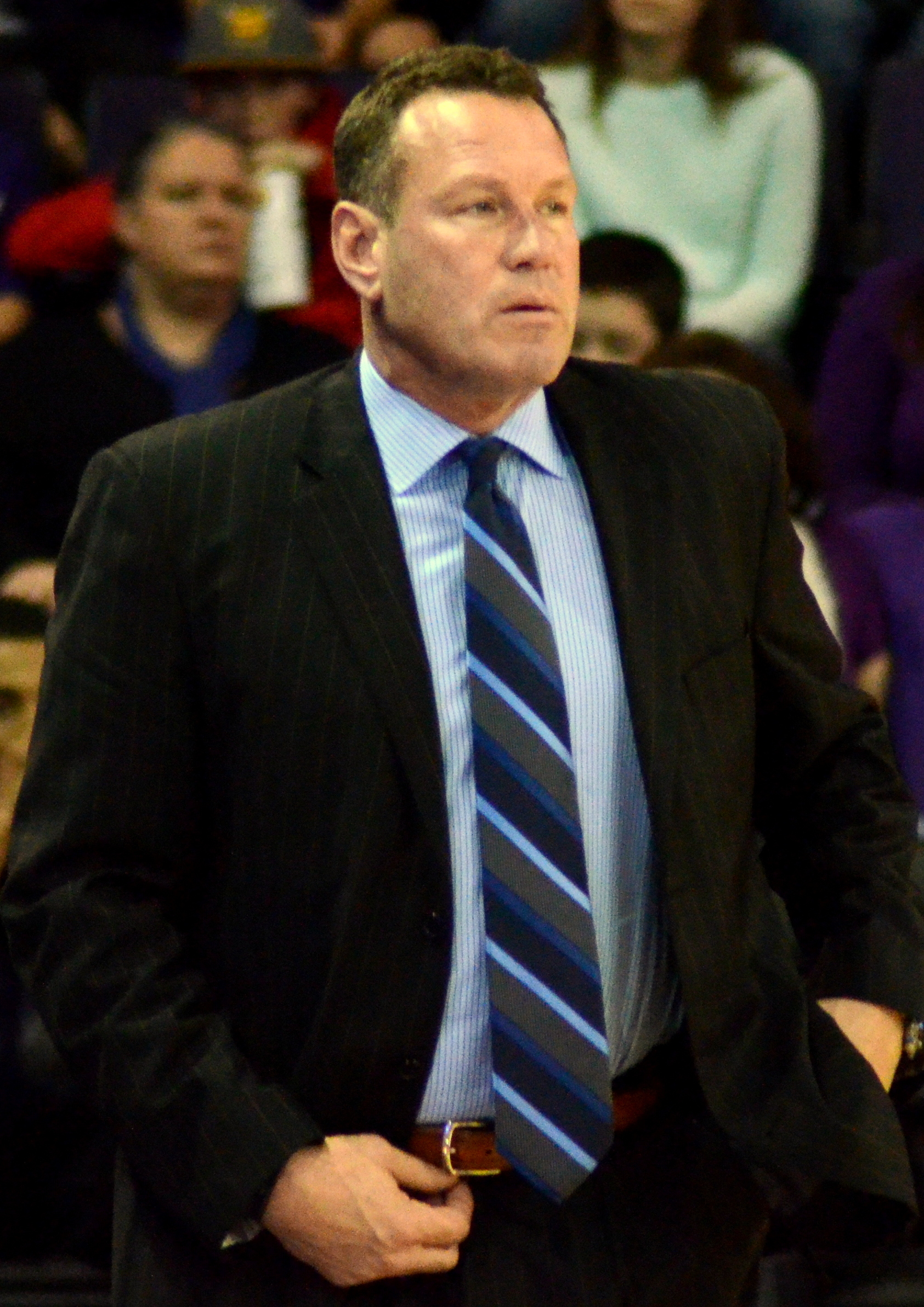
Former NBA All-Star and coach of the Grand Canyon Antelopes Dan Majerle

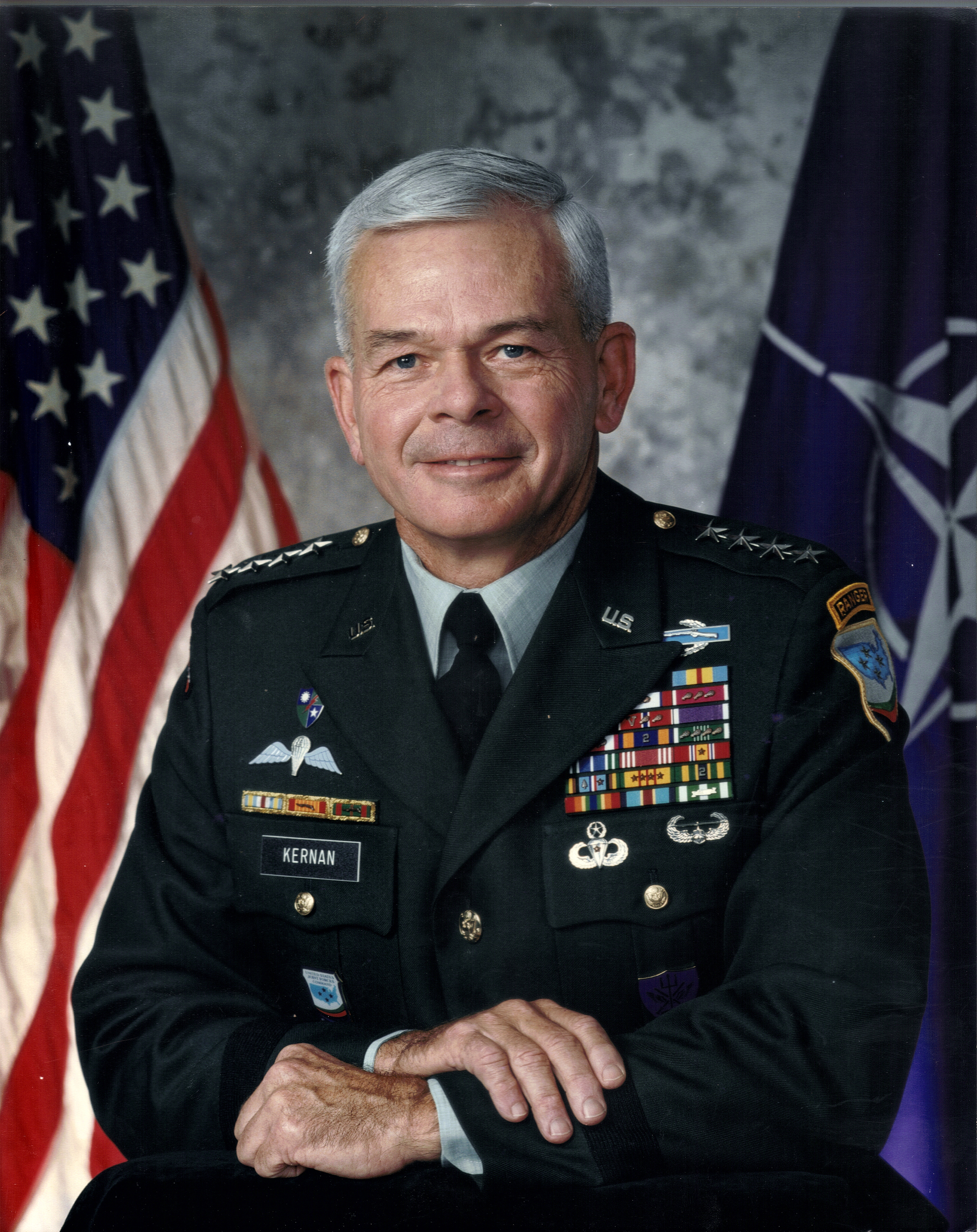
Four-star general William Kernan

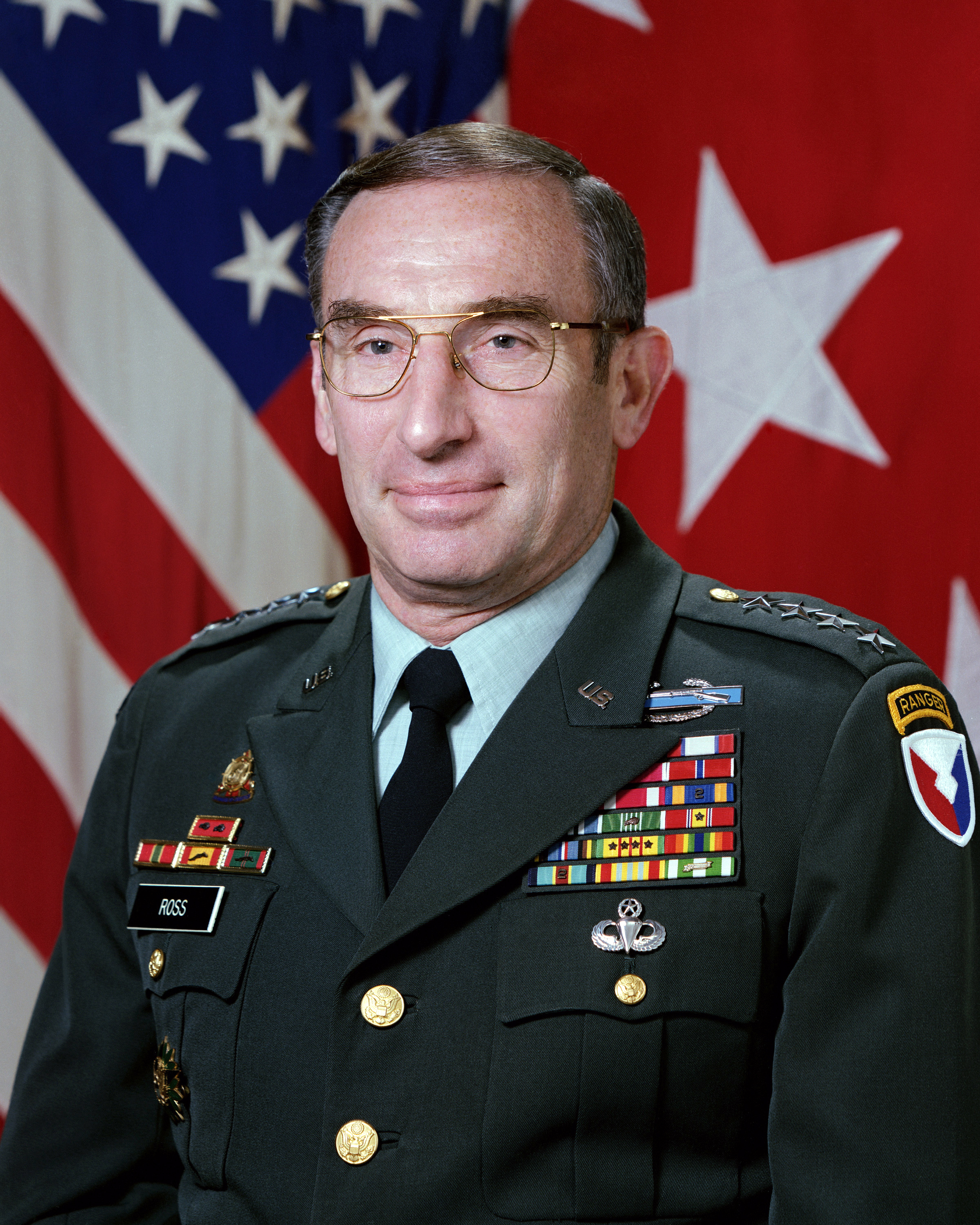
Four-star general Jimmy Ross

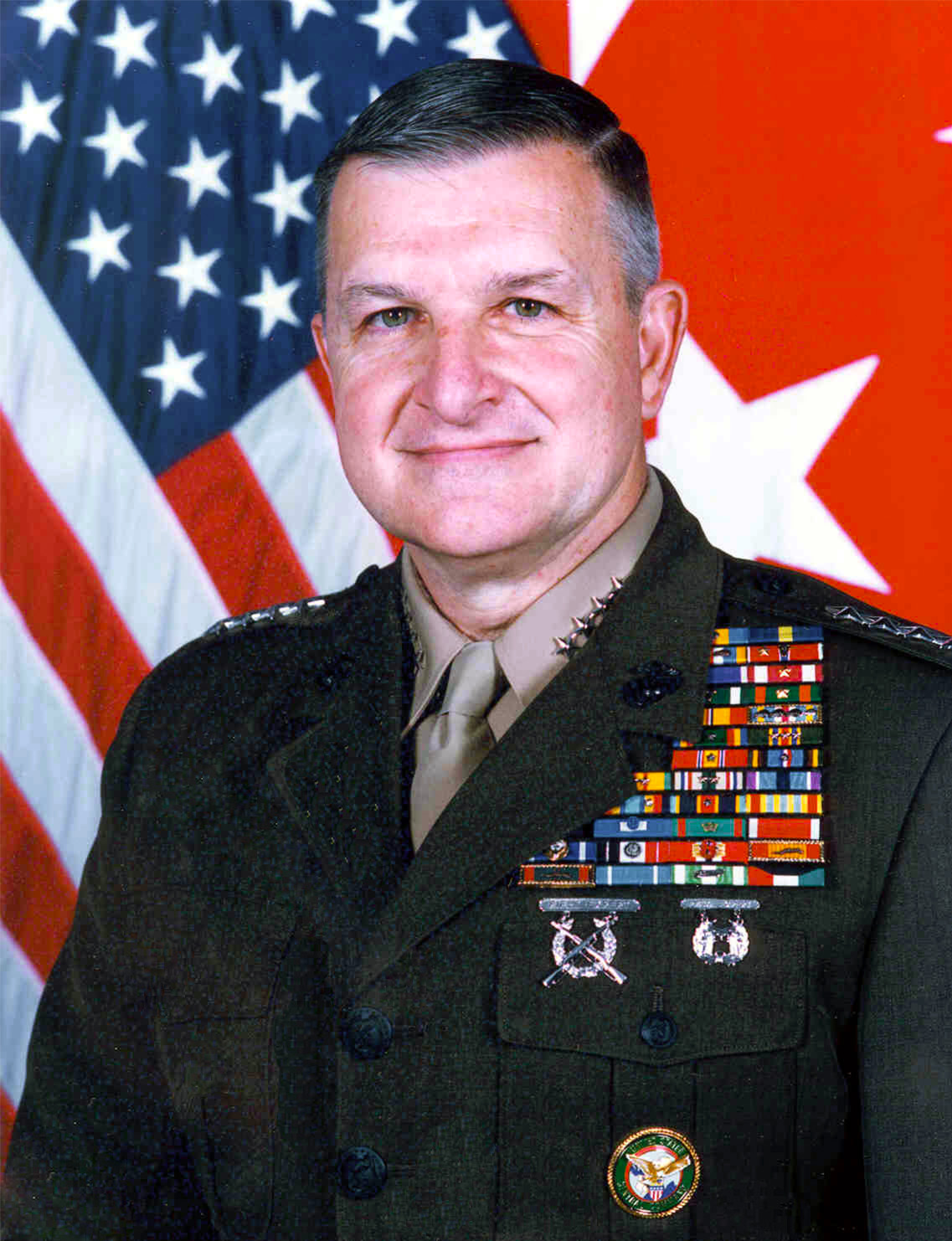
Anthony Zinni, United States Marine Corps general

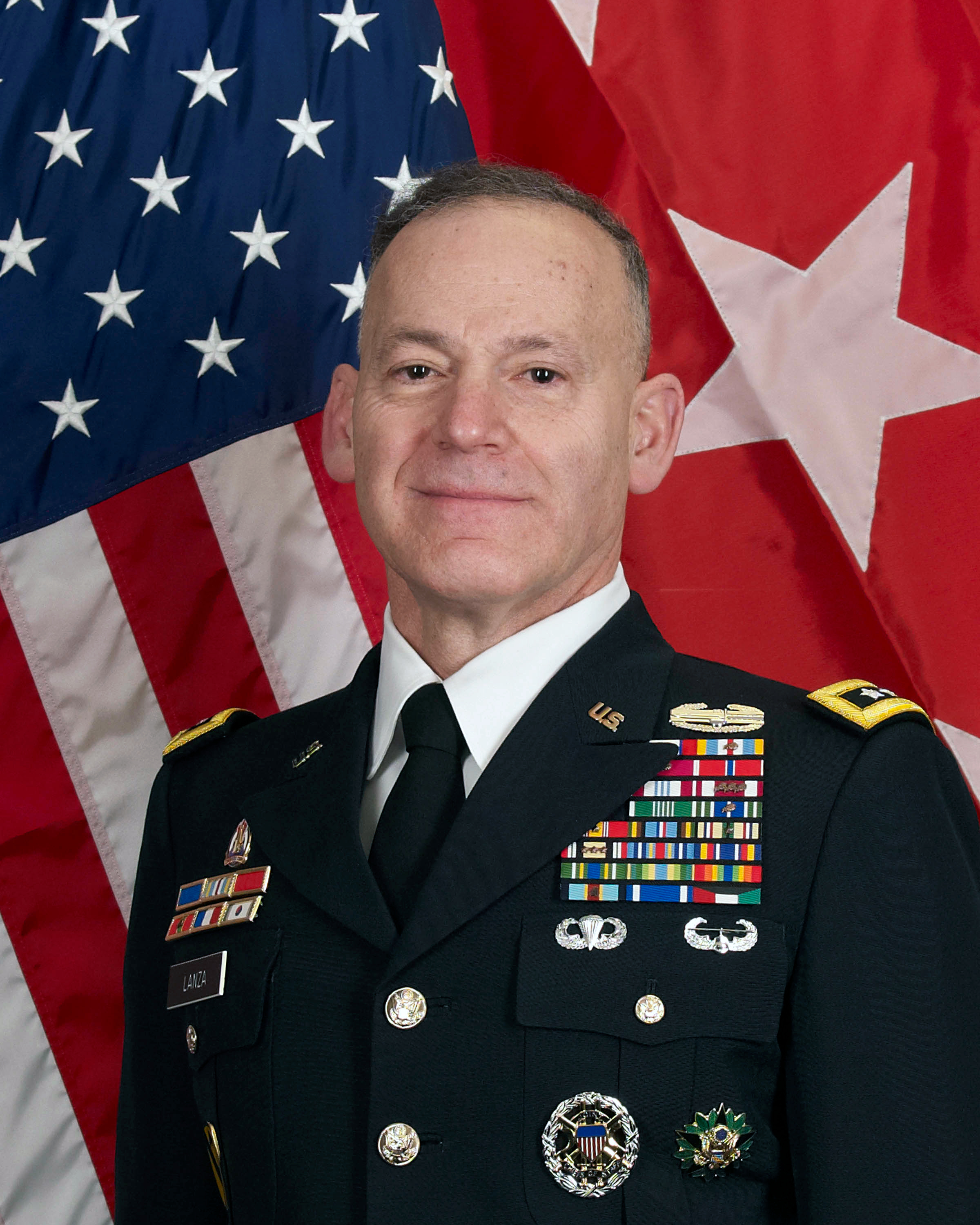
Stephen Lanza, United States Army lieutenant general

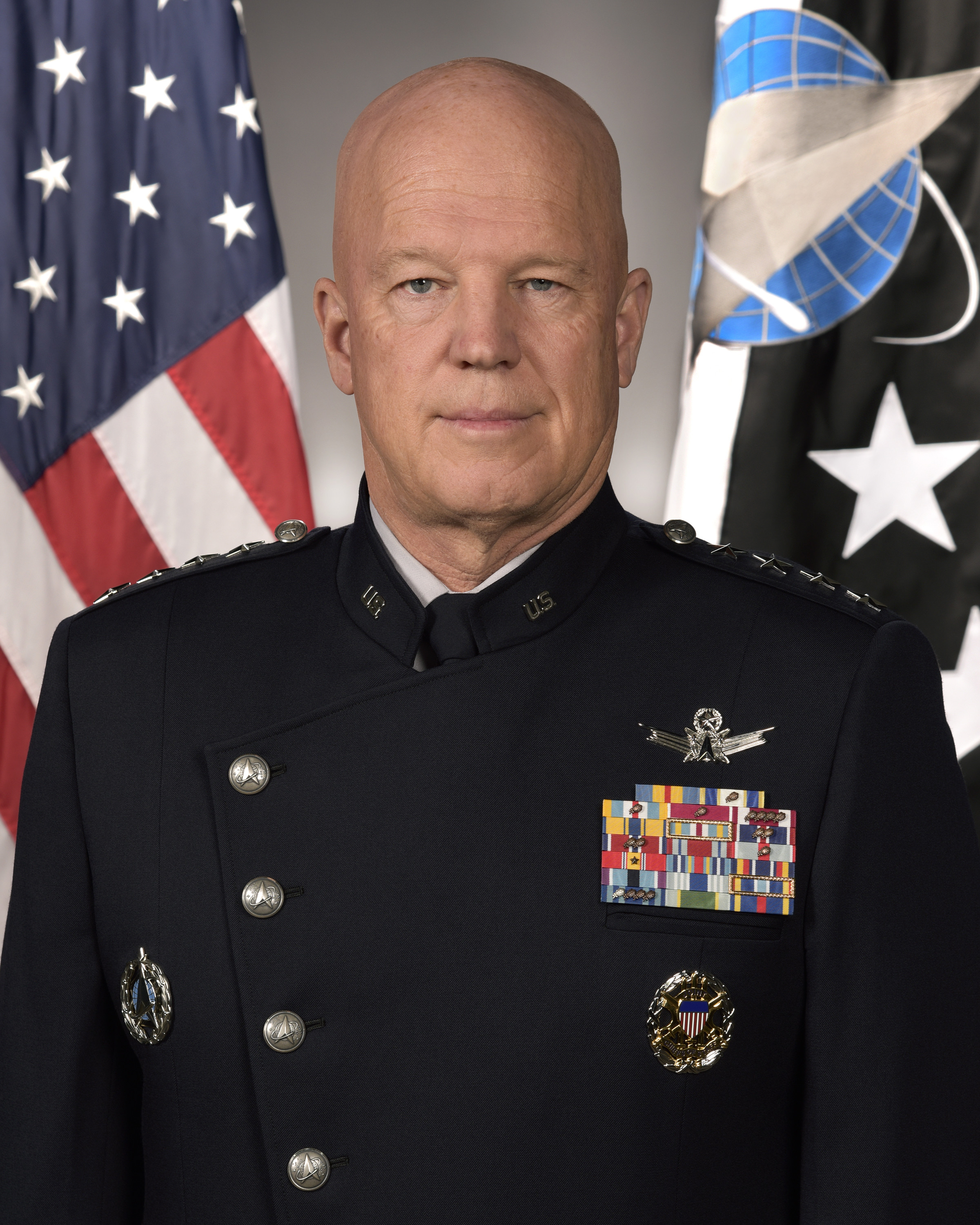
Chief of Space Operations John W. Raymond, United States Space Force
