= Taiwanese Mandarin =

Variety of Mandarin Chinese

- Native to: Taiwan
- Speakers: L1: 14 million (2020); L2: 6.6 million (2020); Total: 21 million (2020)
- Language family: Sino-Tibetan: Sinitic; Chinese; Mandarin; Beijing Mandarin; Standard Chinese; Taiwanese Mandarin
- Writing system: Traditional Chinese characters

Official status
- Official language in: Taiwan
- Regulated by: Ministry of Education

Language codes
- ISO 639-3: –
- ISO 639-6: goyu (Guoyu)
- Glottolog: taib1240
- IETF: cmn-TW
- Percentage of Taiwanese aged 6 and above who spoke Mandarin at home in 2010; darker blue corresponds to a greater percentage of Mandarin speakers

Chinese name
- Traditional Chinese: 臺灣國語
- Simplified Chinese: 台湾国语
- Literal meaning: National language of Taiwan
Transcriptions
Standard Mandarin
- Hanyu Pinyin: Táiwān guóyǔ
- Bopomofo: ㄊㄞˊ ㄨㄢ ㄍㄨㄛˊ ㄩˇ
- Wade–Giles: Tʻai^{2}-wan^{1} kuo^{2}-yü^{3}
- Tongyong Pinyin: Táiwan Guó-yǔ
- IPA: [tʰǎɪ.wán kwǒ.ỳ]

Alternative Chinese name
- Traditional Chinese: 中華民國國語
- Simplified Chinese: 中华民国国语
- Literal meaning: National language of the Republic of China
Transcriptions
Standard Mandarin
- Hanyu Pinyin: Zhōnghuá mínguó gúoyǔ
- Bopomofo: ㄓㄨㄥ ㄏㄨㄚˊ ㄇㄧㄣˊ ㄍㄨㄛˊ ㄍㄨㄛˊ ㄩˇ
- Wade–Giles: Chung^{1}-hua^{2} min^{2}-kuo^{2} kuo^{2}-yü^{3}
- Tongyong Pinyin: Jhong-huá Mín-guó Gúo-yǔ
- IPA: [ʈʂʊ́ŋ.xwǎ mǐn.kwǒ kwǒ.ỳ]

Taiwanese Mandarin, natively referred to as Guoyu (Chinese: 國語; pinyin: Guóyǔ; Zhuyin Fuhao: ㄍㄨㄛˊ ㄩˇ; lit. 'national language') or Huayu (Chinese: 華語; pinyin: Huáyǔ; Zhuyin Fuhao: ㄏㄨㄚˊ ㄩˇ; lit. 'Chinese language'), is the variety of Standard Chinese spoken in Taiwan. A large majority of the Taiwanese population is fluent in Mandarin, though many can also speak Taiwanese Hokkien, (Note: Commonly called Taigi (臺語; Táiyǔ; Tâi-gí) or Taiwanese by Taiwanese speakers themselves. In this article, "Hokkien" generally refers to Taiwanese Hokkien unless otherwise specified. To a much lesser extent, some Taiwanese may also speak Hakka (5.5% as of 2021) or aboriginal languages (1.1%); the influence of these languages on Mandarin is minimal compared to Taiwanese Hokkien.) which has had a significant influence on Taiwanese Mandarin.

Mandarin was not a prevalent spoken language in Taiwan before the mid-20th century. Early Chinese immigrants who settled in Taiwan before Japanese rule mainly spoke other varieties of Chinese languages, primarily Hakka and Hokkien. By contrast, Taiwanese indigenous peoples speak unrelated Formosan languages. Japan annexed Taiwan in 1895 and governed the island as a colony for the next 50 years, introducing the Japanese language in education, government, and public life. With the defeat of Imperial Japan in World War II, Taiwan was transferred to the Republic of China, ruled by the Kuomintang (KMT), which by 1950 had been expelled from the mainland by the Chinese Communist Party (CCP). The KMT promulgated Guoyu while suppressing non-Mandarin languages in the public sphere. At the same time, the People's Republic of China promoted the same national language as Putonghua (普通话; 普通話; Pǔtōnghuà; 'common speech') on the mainland. (Note: Mainland Chinese persons who speak non-Mandarin varieties may still refer to Putonghua as Guoyu.)

Putonghua in mainland China and Guoyu in Taiwan are highly similar and derive from the same standard based on the phonology of the Beijing dialect of Mandarin and the grammar of written vernacular Mandarin in the early 20th century. Standard Guoyu pronunciations tend to be based on prescribed dictionaries of the period, whereas Standard Putonghua integrated colloquial Northern Mandarin pronunciations for some words. Notable characteristics of Guoyu as is commonly spoken in Taiwan include its somewhat different tonal qualities compared to Putonghua, the lack of the erhua phenomenon, and the lack of retroflex consonants (with zh-, ch-, sh- being pronounced like z-, c-, and s-) in most contexts. Guoyu also incorporates vocabulary from Hokkien and Japanese. Some grammatical differences also exist, often due to Hokkien influence. The two varieties of Mandarin have diverged in the decades since the political separation of Taiwan and the mainland. Written Mandarin in Taiwan generally uses traditional characters, in contrast to the simplified characters used in mainland China.

Guoyu spoken in Taiwan exists on a spectrum, from the most formal, standardized variety to the least formal, with the heaviest Hokkien influence. On one end of the spectrum, there is Standard Guoyu (標準國語; Biāozhǔn guóyǔ), an official national language of Taiwan. This variety is taught as the standard in the education system and is employed in official communications and most news media. The core of this standard variety is described in the Ministry of Education Mandarin Chinese Dictionary. Very few people speak purely standard Guoyu, however. Mandarin, as colloquially spoken in Taiwan, can be broadly called "Taiwan Guoyu" (台灣國語; Táiwān guóyǔ). Taiwan Guoyu diverges in varying degrees from Standard Guoyu, with some speakers being closer to Standard Guoyu than others. These divergences are often the result of Taiwan Guoyu incorporating influences from other languages used in Taiwan, primarily Hokkien, but also Japanese. Like Standard Guoyu, Taiwan Guoyu is also mutually intelligible with Putonghua, but when compared with Standard Guoyu, Taiwan Guoyu exhibits greater differences in pronunciation, vocabulary, and grammar.

== Terms and definition ==
Chinese is not a single language but a group of languages in the Sinitic branch of the Sino-Tibetan family, which includes varieties such as Mandarin, Cantonese, and Hakka. They share a common ancestry and, in most cases, the use of Chinese characters in writing; among Chinese speakers, they are popularly considered dialects (方言 fāngyán) of the same, overarching language. These dialects are often extremely divergent in the spoken form, however, and not mutually intelligible. Accordingly, Western and Taiwanese linguists tend to treat them as separate languages rather than dialects of the same language; citing Yuen Ren Chao, John DeFrancis likened the differences among some dialects as like those between English and Dutch, for example.

Mandarin Chinese is a grouping of Chinese languages that includes at least eight subgroups, often also called dialects. In English, "Mandarin" can refer to any of these Mandarin dialects, which are not necessarily mutually intelligible. However, the term is most commonly used to refer to Standard Chinese, the prestige dialect.

Standard Chinese in the People's Republic of China (mainland China) is called Putonghua (普通話; Pǔtōnghuà; 'common speech') and in the Republic of China (Taiwan) Guoyu (國語; Guóyǔ; 'national language'). Both of these are based on the Beijing dialect of Mandarin and are mutually intelligible, but also feature various lexical, phonological, and grammatical differences. There exists significant variation within Putonghua and Guoyu as well. Some scholars have argued that Putonghua and Guoyu are artificial standards that, strictly speaking, do not represent the natively spoken language of a significant number of, or even any, people.

Guoyu exists on a continuum from the most standard, formal version of the language to the form most heavily influenced by Hokkien. The former variety can be called Standard Guoyu (標準國語; Biāozhǔn Guóyǔ) in contrast to the less standard Taiwan Guoyu (臺灣國語; Táiwān Guóyǔ). (Note: The specific terms vary greatly among authors. Some authors use Taiwan Guoyu to refer to the general form of the language spoken in Taiwan, incorporating influence from mutually unintelligible Minnanyu/Hokkien but not necessarily representing the most non-standard form. For example, Fon, Chiang & Cheung (2004) distinguish between everyday Taiwan Guoyu and the form heavily influenced by Minnanyu/Hokkien, which they call Taiwanese Guoyu. English writers may refer to the least standard, most Hokkien-influenced form as Taiwanese-accented Mandarin.) More formal settings—such as television news broadcasts—tend to feature speakers using Standard Guoyu, which closely resembles mainland Putonghua, but is not generally used as a day-to-day language. Language falling on the less standard side of the Guoyu spectrum may be stigmatized as uneducated.

This article focuses on the features of both Standard Guoyu, particularly its relationship to Putonghua, as well as non-standard but widespread features of Mandarin in Taiwan, grouped under Taiwan Guoyu. (Note: Chinese Wikipedia maintains separate articles for the standard form of Guoyu (中華民國國語) and the more colloquial form influenced by Minnanyu (臺灣國語, i.e. Hokkien).)

== History and usage ==
Large-scale Han Chinese settlement of Taiwan began in the 17th century by Hoklo immigrants from Fujian province who spoke Southern Min languages (predominantly Hokkien), and to a lesser extent, Hakka immigrants who spoke their respective language. Taiwanese indigenous peoples already inhabited the island, speaking a variety of Austronesian languages unrelated to Chinese, mostly under the Formosan language grouping. In the centuries following Chinese settlement, the number of indigenous languages dropped significantly, with several going extinct, in part due to the process of sinicization.

Official communications among the Han were done in Mandarin (官話; Guānhuà; 'official language'), but the primary languages of everyday life were Hokkien or Hakka. After its defeat in the First Sino-Japanese War, the Qing dynasty ceded Taiwan to the Empire of Japan, which governed the island as an Imperial colony from 1895 to 1945. By the end of the colonial period, Japanese had become the high dialect of the island as the result of decades of Japanization policy.

=== Under KMT rule ===
After the Republic of China under the Kuomintang (KMT) gained control of Taiwan in 1945, Mandarin was introduced as the official language and made compulsory in schools, although the local population rarely spoke it at the time. Many who had fled the mainland after the defeat of the KMT by the Communists also spoke non-standard varieties of Mandarin, which may have influenced later colloquial pronunciations. Wu Chinese dialects were also influential due to the relative power of KMT refugees from Wu-speaking Zhejiang, Chiang Kai-shek's home province.

The Mandarin Promotion Council (now called National Languages Committee) was established in 1946 by Chief Executive Chen Yi to standardize and popularize the usage of Mandarin in Taiwan. The Kuomintang heavily discouraged the use of Southern Min and other non-Mandarin languages, portraying them as inferior, and school children were punished for speaking their non-Mandarin native languages. Guoyu was thus established as a lingua franca among the various groups in Taiwan at the expense of existing languages.

=== Post-martial law ===
Following the end of martial law in 1987, language policy in the country underwent liberalization, but Mandarin remained the dominant language. Local languages were no longer proscribed in public discourse, mass media, and schools. English and "mother tongue education" (母語教育; mǔyǔ jiàoyù) — Hokkien and Hakka — were introduced as elective subjects in primary school in 2001. Greater time and resources are devoted to both Mandarin and English, which are compulsory subjects, compared to mother tongue instruction.

Government statistics from 2020 found that 66.3% of Taiwanese residents use Mandarin as their primary language, and another 30.4% use it as a secondary language (31.7% used Hokkien as their primary language, and 54.3% used it as a secondary language). Guoyu is the primary language for over 80% of people in the northern areas of Taipei, Taoyuan, and Hsinchu. Youth is correlated with use of Guoyu: in 2020, over two-thirds of Taiwanese over 65 used Hokkien or Hakka as their primary language, compared with just 11% of 15–24-year-olds.

A 2004 study found that Mandarin was spoken more fluently by Hakka and Taiwanese indigenous peoples than their respective mother tongues; Hoklo groups, on average, spoke better Hokkien, but Hoklo under 50 years old still spoke significantly better Mandarin (with comparable levels of fluency to their usage of Hokkien) than the elderly. (Note: A standardized 5.00-scaled test of Mandarin ability was administered to participants. Among Minnanren (Hoklo) the mean was 4.81 for young (under 31 years old) participants, 4.61 for middle aged participants (31–50), and 3.24 for the elderly (>50). The mean score for mainland descendants as a whole was 4.90.) Overall, while both national and local levels of government have taken some measures to promote the use of non-Mandarin Chinese languages, younger generations generally prefer using Mandarin.

== Script ==
Guoyu employs traditional Chinese characters (which are also used in the two special administrative regions of China, Hong Kong and Macau), rather than the simplified Chinese characters used in mainland China. Literate Taiwanese can generally understand a text in simplified characters.

=== Shorthand characters ===
In practice, Taiwanese Mandarin users may write informal, shorthand characters (俗字; súzì; 'customary/conventional characters'; also 俗體字 sútǐzì) in place of the full traditional forms. These variant Chinese characters are generally easier to write by hand and consist of fewer strokes. Shorthand characters are often identical to their simplified counterparts, but they may also take after Japanese kanji, or differ from both, as shown in the table below. A few shorthand characters are used as frequently as standard traditional characters, even in formal contexts, such as the tai in Taiwan, which is often written as 台, as opposed to the standard traditional form, 臺.

Shorthand	Traditional	Notes
会	會	Identical to simplified 会 (huì)
机	機	Identical to simplified 机 (jī)
発	發	Identical to Japanese, cf. simplified 发 (fā)
奌	點	Differs from both simplified Chinese and Japanese 点, although 奌 is also a Japanese ryakuji shorthand variant (diǎn)
転	轉	Identical to Japanese, cf. simplified 转 (zhuàn, zhuǎn)
亇	個	Differs from both simplified Chinese 个 (gè) and Japanese 箇 or katakana ケ
対	對	Identical to Japanese, cf. simplified 对 (duì)
歺	餐	餐 is standard simplified as well. 歺 is formally a variant of the unrelated 歹 dǎi but is identical to the short-lived second-round simplification version of 餐. (cān)
咡	聽	Unlike simplified 听, 咡 retains the radical for 'ear' (耳) (tīng).

In informal writing, Guoyu speakers may replace possessive particles 的 de or 之 zhī with the Japanese particle の no in hiragana (usually read as de), which serves a nearly identical grammatical role. No is often used in advertising, where it evokes a sense of playfulness and fashionability, and handwriting, as it is easier to write.

=== Braille ===
Taiwanese Braille is similar to Mainland Chinese Braille, though several sounds are represented by different patterns. Both systems represent the sounds of the language (as do Pinyin and Zhuyin), not Chinese characters themselves.

=== Transliteration ===
==== Zhuyin Fuhao ====
While pinyin is used in applications such as in signage, most Taiwanese people learn Mandarin phonetics through bopomofo (zhuyin). Taiwan is the only Chinese-speaking polity to use the system, which is taught in schools (often used as ruby characters to aid young learners) and represents the dominant digital input method on electronic devices. Before the introduction of Hanyu pinyin starting in 1958, it was also used in mainland China, where it is today sometimes employed in language education and in some dictionaries. It has accordingly become a symbol of Taiwanese identity as well.

==== Romanization ====
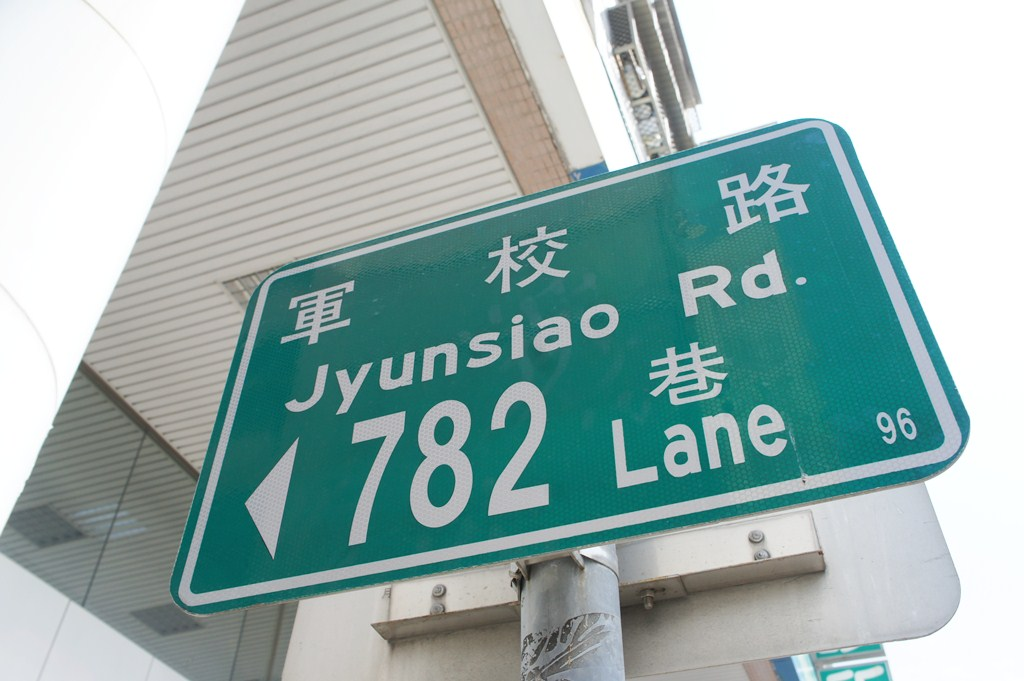
Road sign in Nanzih District, Kaohsiung, showing Tongyong pinyin without tone marks (Jyunsiao in Hanyu pinyin is Junxiao)

Chinese language romanization in Taiwan somewhat differs from on the mainland, where Hanyu Pinyin is the official standard. A competing system, Tongyong Pinyin, was formally revealed in 1998 with the support of the mayor of Taipei Chen Shuibian. In 1999, however, the Legislative Yuan endorsed a slightly modified version of Hanyu Pinyin, creating parallel romanization schemes along largely partisan lines, with Kuomintang-supporting areas using Hanyu Pinyin, and Democratic Progressive Party (DPP) areas using Tongyong Pinyin. In 2002, the Taiwanese government led by the DPP promulgated the use of Tongyong Pinyin as the country's preferred system, but this was formally abandoned in 2009 in favor of Hanyu Pinyin.

In addition, various other historical romanization systems also exist across the island, with multiple systems sometimes existing in the same locality. Following the defeat of the Kuomintang in the Chinese Civil War and their subsequent retreat to Taiwan in 1945, little emphasis was placed on the romanization of Chinese characters, with the Wade-Giles system used as the default. It is still widely used for transcribing people's legal names today. The Gwoyeu Romatzyh method, invented in 1928, also was in use in Taiwan during this time period, albeit to a lesser extent. In 1984, Taiwan's Ministry of Education began revising the Gwoyeu Romatzyh method out of concern that Hanyu Pinyin was gaining prominence internationally. Ultimately, a revised version of Gwoyeu Romatzyh was released in 1986, which was called Mandarin Phonetic Symbols II. However, this system was not widely adopted.

== Phonology ==
=== Standard Guoyu ===
Highly standard Guoyu utterance
A male Central News Agency newscaster from Taipei, Henry Wu Shenghung, reading out Article 1 of the Universal Declaration of Human Rights in a formal Standard Guoyu accent. Note shift of retroflexes to postalveolar in words like 生 shēng (from [ʂ] to [ɹ̠̊˔]), the pronunciation of 和 'and' as hàn (compared to hé in mainland Putonghua). The speaker below pronounces it hé, which is also acceptable in Taiwan.

Colloquial Guoyu utterance
A man from Taipei reading the same text in a more colloquial accent. Note the overall tonal pitch, such as in 條 tiáo. This utterance, while not completely standard, does not exhibit the more divergent features of Taiwan Guoyu described in this article.

Like Putonghua, both Standard and Taiwan Guoyu are tonal. Pronunciation of many individual characters differs in the standards prescribed by language authorities in Taipei and Beijing. Mainland authorities tended to adopt pronunciations popular in Northern Mandarin areas, whereas Taiwanese authorities prefer traditional pronunciations recorded in dictionaries from the 1930s and 1940s. Some examples of differences are given later in this section.

These character-level differences notwithstanding, Standard Guoyu pronunciation is largely identical to Putonghua, but with two major systematic differences (also true of Taiwan Guoyu):

- Erhua, the rhotacization of certain morphemes with the suffix -兒 -er, is very rare in Guoyu (and very common in Beijing Putonghua).
- The "neutral tone" (輕聲 qīngshēng) does not occur as often, so final syllables generally retain their tone (e.g., 但是 dànshì, 先生 xiānshēng).
  - This tendency to retain original tone is not present in words ending noun with suffixes such as -子 -zi or -頭 -tou; Guoyu speakers would not pronounce 孩子 as *háizǐ.

In addition, two other phenomena, while nonstandard, are extremely common across all Mandarin speakers in Taiwan, even the highly educated:

- The retroflex sounds zh- [ʈ͡ʂ], ch- [ʈ͡ʂʰ], and sh- [ʂ] merge into the alveolar consonants (z- [t͡s], c- [t͡sʰ], s- [s], respectively).
- The finals -ing [iŋ] and -eng [əŋ] have largely merged into -in [in] and -en [ən], respectively.

=== Taiwan Guoyu ===
Taiwan Guoyu pronunciation is strongly influenced by Hokkien. This is especially prominent in areas where Hokkien is common, namely, in Central and Southern Taiwan. Many, though not all, of the phonological differences between Taiwan Guoyu and Putonghua can be attributed to the influence of Hokkien.

Notable phonological features of Taiwan Guoyu include: (Note: Note that not all of these features may be present in all speakers at all times.)

- In addition to the merger of retroflex sounds into the alveolar consonants mentioned above, utterances in Taiwan Guoyu may feature retroflexes (in pinyin, zh-, ch-, sh-, and r-) realized as postalveolar consonants: [ʈʂ] to [tʃ], [ʈʂʰ] to [tʃʰ], [ʂ] to [ʃ],and [ʐ] to [ɹ].
  - The ability to produce retroflex sounds is considered a hallmark of "good" Mandarin (i.e. Standard Guoyu); some speakers may hypercorrect to pronounce alveolar consonants as their retroflex counterparts when attempting to speak "proper" Guoyu.
- The initial f- becomes a voiceless bilabial fricative [ɸ], closer to a light 'h' in standard English (for example, 反 fǎn → 緩 huǎn).
- The syllable written as eng ([əŋ]) after labials (in pinyin, b-, p-, m-, f- and w-) is pronounced ong ([o̞ŋ]). Thus, 風 fēng may be pronounced as fōng.
- The semivowel /w/ may change, rendering e.g. the surname 翁 Wēng as [ʋəŋ] rather than [wəŋ]. The deletion of /w/ also happens in colloquial Putonghua, but less frequently.
- The initials n- and l- are sometimes interchangeable, particularly preceding nasal finals (i.e. -n, -ng). Thus, 男 nán may be pronounced lán.
- The nasal finals -n and -ng tend to merge, so words like 爭 zhēng and 真 zhēn may become homophones.
- The endings -uo, -ou, and -e (when it represents a close-mid back unrounded vowel [ɤ] like in 喝 hē) shift to a mid central vowel [ə] or merge into the mid back rounded vowel -o [o̞].
- The close front rounded vowel in words such as 雨 yǔ become unrounded, transforming into yǐ.
- The diphthong -ei [ei] and the triphthong -ui [uei] are monophthongized into [e].

==== Reduction ====
The non-standard Taiwanese Guoyu tends to exhibit frequent, informal elision and cluster reduction when spoken. For example, 這樣子 zhè yàngzi 'this way, like so' can be pronounced similar to 醬子 jiàngzi 'paste, sauce'; wherein the "theoretical" retroflex (so called because it is a feature of Standard Guoyu but rarely realized in everyday speech, as zh- is usually pronounced z-; see above section) is assimilated into the palatal glide [j].

Often the reduction involves the removal of initials in compound words, such as dropping the t in 今天 jīntiān 'today' or the ch in 非常 fēicháng 'extremely, very'. These reductions are not necessarily a function of the speed of speech than of register, as it is more commonly used in casual conversations than in formal contexts.

==== Tone quality ====
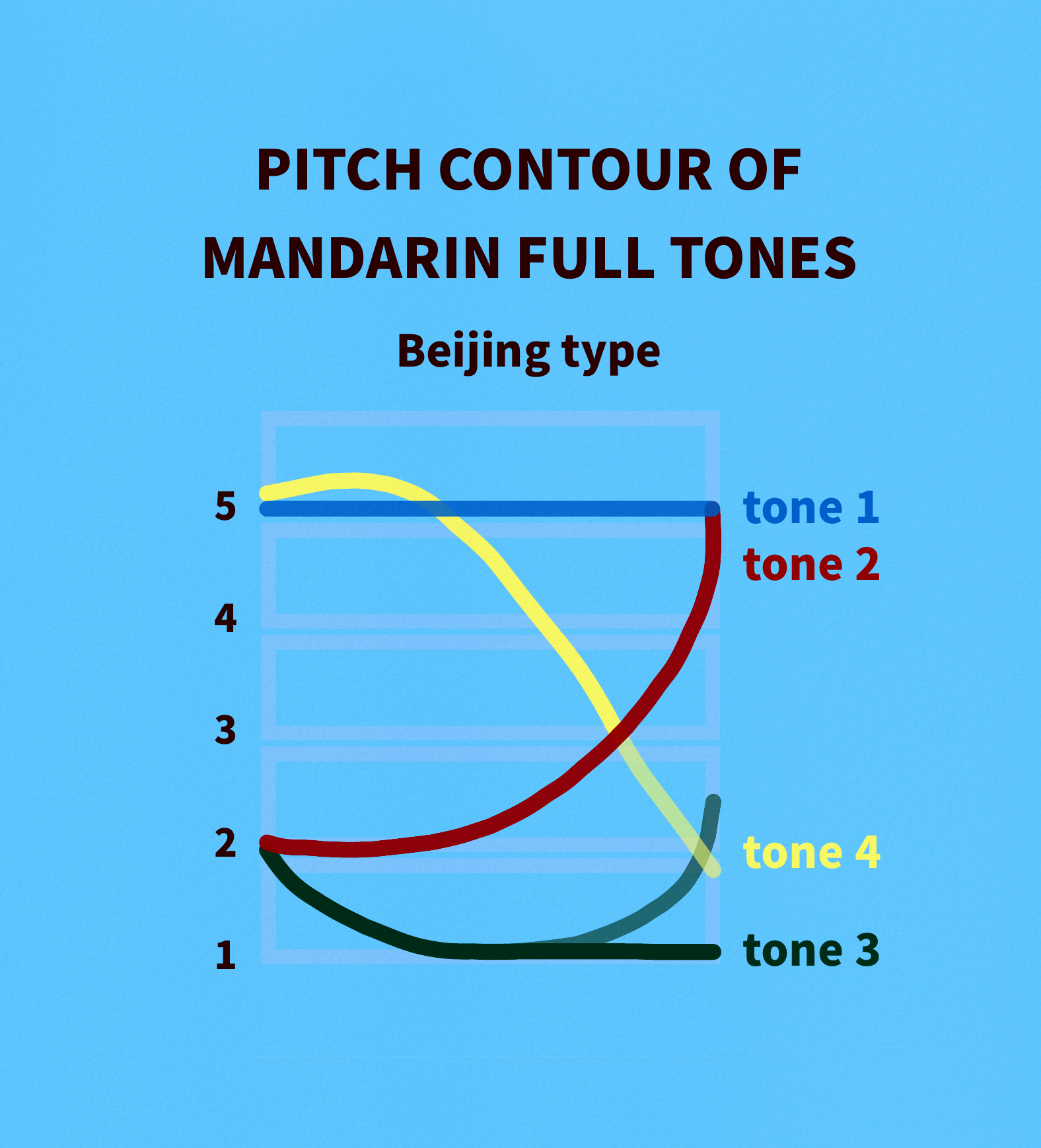
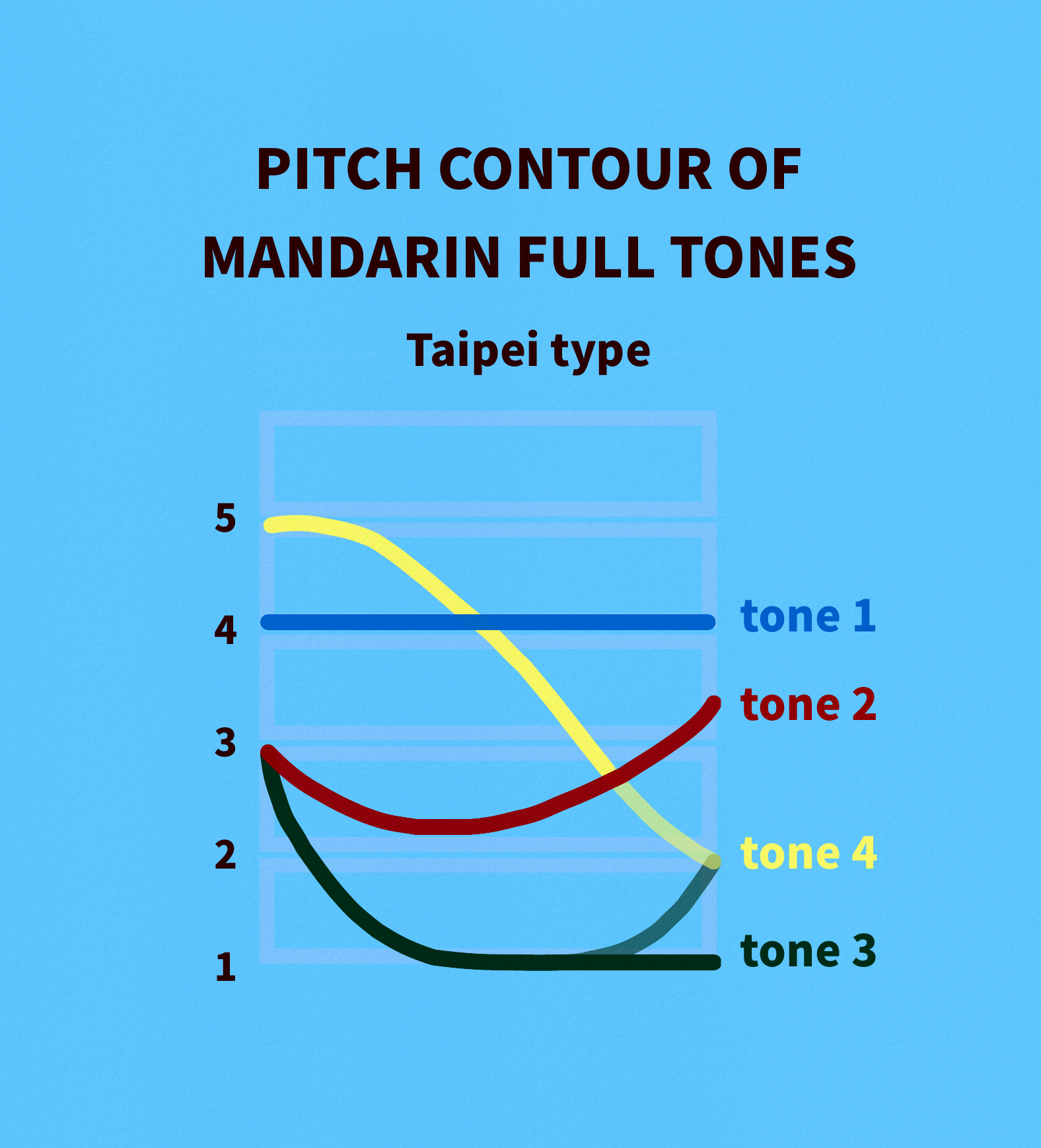
Generalized representation of tone contours of Mandarin speakers from Beijing and Taipei

Like all varieties of Mandarin, Guoyu is a tonal language. Putonghua as spoken in the mainland has five tones, including the neutral tone. Tones in Guoyu differ somewhat in pitch and contour.

Research suggests that speakers of Guoyu articulate the second and third tones differently from the standards of Beijing Mandarin. The precise nature of the tonal differences is not well attested, however, as relevant studies often lack a sufficiently large variety of speakers. Tones may vary based on age, gender, and other sociolinguistic factors and may not even be consistent across every utterance by an individual.

In general, for Guoyu speakers, the second tone does not rise as high in its pitch, according to Jeroen Wiedenhof, and the third tone does not "dip" back up from the low, creaky voice range. Overall, Guoyu speakers may exhibit a lower and more narrow pitch range than speakers of the Mandarin of Beijing. Acoustic analysis of 33 Mandarin speakers from Taiwan in 2008 also found that for many speakers, the second tone tends to have a dipping contour more akin to that of the prescriptive third tone.

=== Standard pronunciations compared to Putonghua ===
In addition to differences in elision and influence from Hokkien, which are not features that are codified in the standard Guoyu, there are differences in pronunciation that arise from conflicting official standards in Taiwan and the mainland.

Quantification of the extent of pronunciation differences between Guoyu and Putonghua varies. Estimates from graduate-level research include a 2008 study based on the 7,000 characters in the List of Commonly Used Characters in Modern Chinese, which found approximately 18% differed between Guoyu and Putonghua, and 13% for the 3,500 most commonly used characters. A 1992 study, however, found differences in 22.5% of the 3,500 most common characters.

Much of the difference can be traced to the preferences of linguistic authorities on the two sides; the mainland standard prefers popular pronunciations in northern areas, whereas the Taiwanese standard prefers those documented in dictionaries in the 1930s and 1940s. The Taiwanese formal standards may not always reflect actual pronunciations commonly used by actual Taiwanese speakers of Guoyu. (Note: For example, the Ministry of Education standards dictate that some words (e.g. 熱鬧 rènào, 認識 rènshì, 衣服 yīfú, 力量 lìliàng) be pronounced with the second character in a neutral tone, in contrast to how most Taiwanese speakers of Mandarin actually say them.)

The following is a table of relatively common characters pronounced differently in Guoyu and Putonghua in most or all contexts (Guoyu/Putonghua):

- 息 xí/xī
- 識 (识) shì/shí
- 擊 (击) jí/jī
- 擁 (拥) yǒng/yōng

- 惜 xí/xī
- 微 wéi/wēi
- 期 qí/qī
- 跌 dié/diē

- 跡 (迹) jī/jì
- 究 jiù/jiū
- 突 tú/tū
- 崖 yái/yá

- 暫 (暂) zhàn/zàn
- 血 xiě/xuè
- 熟 shóu/shú
- 垃圾 lèsè/lājī (Note: This word means 'garbage'. Neither character generally appears independent of the other outside the context of this word (that is, they are bound forms).)

Note that many of the above include tonal differences where a first tone in Putonghua is pronounced second tone in Guoyu. Some pronunciation differences may only appear in certain words. The following is a list of examples of such differences (Guoyu/Putonghua):

- 和 'and' — hé, hàn / hé. In Guoyu, the character may be read as hàn when used as a conjunction, whereas it is always read hé in Putonghua. This pronunciation does not apply in contexts outside of 和 as a conjunction, e.g. compound words like 和平 hépíng 'peace'.
- 暴露 'to expose' — pùlù / bàolù. The pronunciation bào is used in all other contexts in Guoyu.
- 質量 (质量) 'mass; quality' — zhíliàng / zhìliàng. 質 is pronounced zhí in most contexts in Guoyu, except in select words like 人質 rénzhì 'hostage' or 質押 zhìyā 'to pawn'. Zhíliàng means 'mass' in both Guoyu and Putonghua, but for Guoyu speakers it does not also mean 'quality' (instead preferring 品質 pǐnzhí for this meaning).
- 從容 (从容) 'unhurried, calm' — cōngróng / cóngróng. 從 cóng is only pronounced cōng in this specific word in Guoyu.
- 口吃 'stutter' — kǒují / kǒuchī. 吃 is only read jí when it means 'to stammer' (as opposed to 'to eat', the most common meaning).

== Vocabulary differences from mainland Putonghua ==
Guoyu and Putonghua share a large majority of their vocabulary, but significant differences do exist. (Note: Chinese Wikipedia maintains a more extensive table of vocabulary differences between Taiwan, Macau, Hong Kong, Malaysia, Singapore and mainland China.) The lexical divergence of Guoyu from Putonghua is the result of several factors, including the prolonged political separation of the mainland and Taiwan, the influence of Imperial Japanese rule on Taiwan until 1945, and the influence of Hokkien. The Cross Strait Common Usage Dictionary categorizes differences as "same word, different meaning" (同名異實 tóngmíng yìshí — homonyms); "same meaning, different word" (同實異名 tóngshí yìmíng); and "Taiwan terms" (臺灣用語 Táiwān yòngyǔ) and "mainland terms" (大陸用語 dàlù yòngyǔ) for words and phrases specific to a given side.

=== Same meaning, different word ===
The political separation of Taiwan and mainland China after the end of the Chinese Civil War in 1949 contributed to many differences in vocabulary. This is especially prominent in words and phrases which refer to things or concepts invented after the split; thus, modern scientific and technological terminology often differs greatly between Putonghua and Guoyu.

The differences may be prevalent enough to hinder communication between Guoyu and Putonghua speakers unfamiliar with each other's respective dialects. For instance, Zhang (2000) selected four hundred core nouns from computer science and found that while 58% are identical in Standard and Taiwanese Mandarin, 22% were "basically" or "entirely" different.

As cross-strait relations began to improve in the early 21st century, direct interaction between mainland China and Taiwan increased, and some vocabulary began to merge, especially by means of the Internet. For example, the words 瓶頸 (瓶颈) píngjǐng 'bottleneck' and 作秀 zuòxiù 'to grandstand, show off' were originally unique to Guoyu in Taiwan but have since become widely used in mainland China as well. Guoyu has also incorporated mainland phrases and words, such as 渠道 qúdào, meaning 'channel (of communication)', in addition to the traditional Guoyu term, 管道 guǎndào.

Examples of vocabulary differences between Guoyu and Putonghua
English	Taiwan	Mainland China
Internet	網路(wǎnglù)	网络(wǎngluò)
Briefcase	公事包(gōngshìbāo)	公文包(gōngwénbāo)
Bento	便當(biàndāng)	盒饭(héfàn)
Software	軟體(ruǎntǐ)	软件(ruǎnjiàn)
Introduction, preamble	引言(yǐnyán)	导语(dǎoyǔ)
To print	列印(lièyìn)	打印(dǎyìn)

Words may be formed from abbreviations in one form of Mandarin but not the other. For example, in Taiwan, bubble tea, 珍珠奶茶 zhēnzhū nǎichá, is often abbreviated 珍奶 zhēnnǎi, but this is not common on the mainland. Likewise, traffic rules/regulations, 交通規則 (交通规则) jiāotōng guīzé, is abbreviated as 交规 jiāoguī on the mainland, but not in Taiwan.

=== Same word, different meaning ===
Some identical terms have different meanings in Guoyu and Putonghua. There may be alternative synonyms which can be used unambiguously by speakers on both sides.

Examples of identical terms with different meanings in Guoyu and Putonghua
Term	Guoyu meaning	Putonghua meaning
油品 yóupǐn	oils, oil-based products in general	petroleum products
影集 yǐngjí	TV series	photo album
土豆 tǔdòu	peanut (Note: 花生 huāshēng, the Putonghua word for peanut, is an acceptable synonym in Guoyu.)	potato (Note: 馬鈴薯 (马铃薯; mǎlíngshǔ), another synonym for potato, is also used in both dialects.)
公車 (公车) gōngchē (Note: 公共汽車 (公共汽车; gōnggòng qìchē; 'public vehicle') is an unambiguous term for bus in both dialects.)	bus	government or official vehicle
愛人 (爱人) àirén	lover	spouse

The same word carry different connotations or usage patterns in Guoyu and Putonghua, and may be polysemous in one form of Mandarin but not the other. For example, 誇張 (夸张) kuāzhāng means 'to exaggerate,' but in Taiwan, it can also be used to express exclamation at something absurd or overdone, a meaning absent in Putonghua. 籠絡 (笼络) lǒngluò in Guoyu means 'to convince, win over', but in Putonghua, it carries a negative connotation (cf. 'beguile, coax'). Another example is 小姐 xiǎojiě, meaning 'miss' or 'young lady', regularly used to address young women in Guoyu. On the mainland, however, the word is also a euphemism for a prostitute and is therefore not used as a polite term of address.

=== Differing usage or preference ===
Guoyu and Putonghua speakers may also display strong preference for one of a set of synonyms. For example, both 禮拜 lǐbài (礼拜) and 星期 xīngqí (xīngqī in Putonghua) are acceptable words for 'week' in Guoyu and Putonghua, but 禮拜 is more common in Taiwan.

Guoyu tends to preserve older lexical items that are less used in the mainland. In Taiwan, speakers may use a more traditional 早安 zǎo'ān to say 'good morning', whereas mainland speakers generally default to 早上好 zǎoshang hǎo, for instance.

Likewise, words with the same literal meaning in either dialect may differ in register. 而已 éryǐ 'that's all, only' is common both in spoken and written Guoyu, influenced by speech patterns in Hokkien, but in Putonghua the word is largely confined to formal, written contexts.

Preference for the expression of modality often differs among northern Mandarin speakers and Taiwanese, as evidenced by the selection of modal verbs. For example, Taiwanese Mandarin users strongly prefer 要 yào and 不要 búyào over 得 děi and 別 bié, respectively, to express 'must' and 'must not', compared to native speakers from Beijing. However, 要 yào and 不要 búyào are also predominantly used among Mandarin speakers from the south of the mainland. Both pairs are grammatically correct in either dialect.

=== Words specific to Guoyu ===
Some words in Putonghua may not exist in Guoyu and vice versa. Authors of the Dictionary of Words Which Differ Across the Taiwan Strait (《两岸差异词词典》) estimate there are about 2,000 words unique to Guoyu, around 10% of which come from Hokkien. Additionally, many terms unique to Guoyu were adopted from Japanese as a result of Taiwan's status as a Japanese colony during the first half of the 20th century.

Some of the vocabulary differences stem from different social and political conditions, which gave rise to concepts that were not shared between the mainland and Taiwan, e.g. 福彩 fúcǎi, a common abbreviation for the China Welfare Lottery of the People's Republic of China, or 十八趴 shíbāpā, which refers to the 18% preferential interest rate on civil servants' pension funds in Taiwan. (趴 pā as "percent" originates from Japanese パーセント pāsento. This usage is also unique to Guoyu.)

==== Particles ====
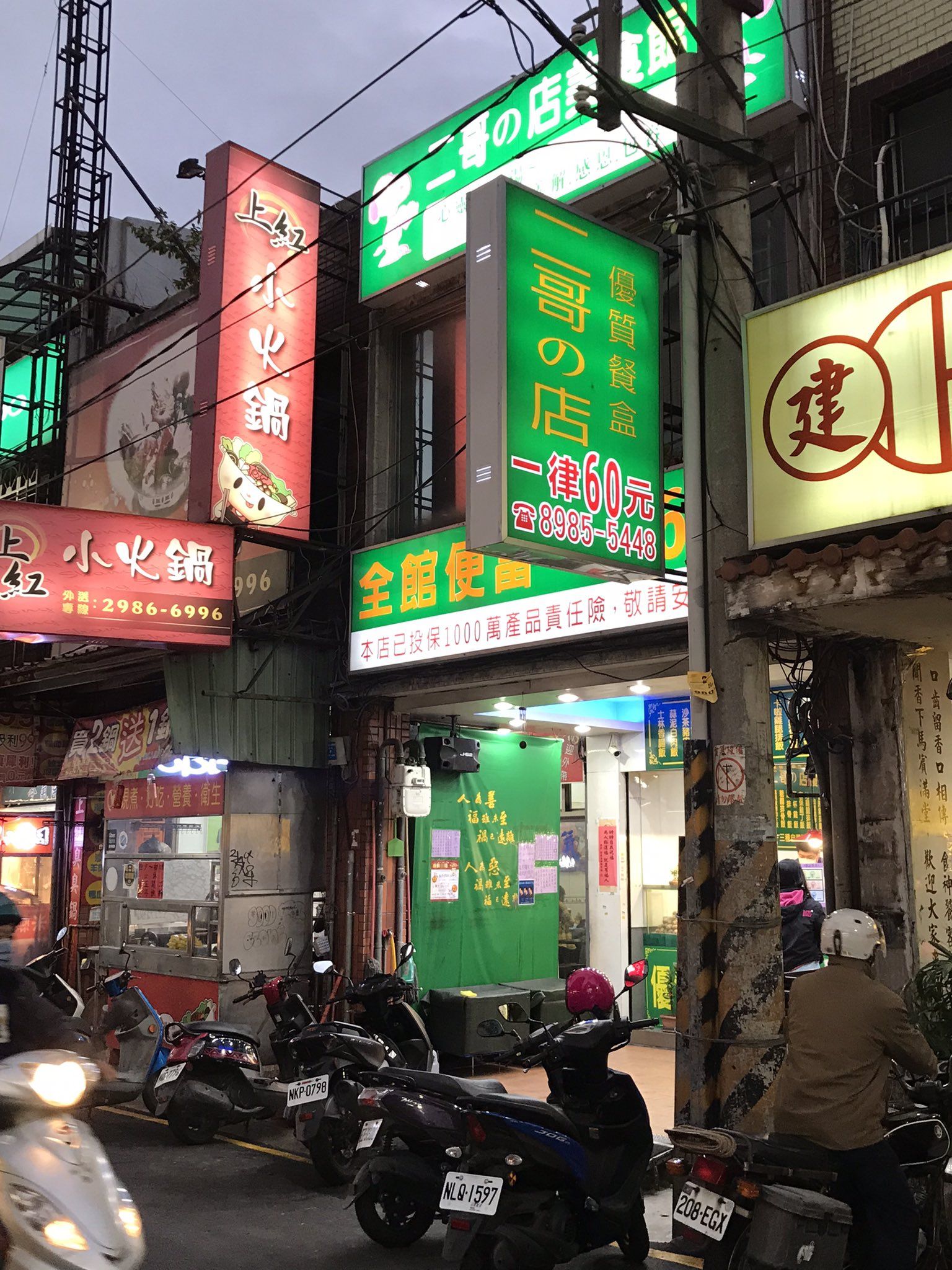
The protruding green sign, for a bento shop in Taipei, uses a stylistic Japanese の. The sign behind it advertises bento as 便當, another term unique to Taiwanese Mandarin.

Modal particles convey modality, which can be understood as a speaker's attitude towards a given utterance (e.g. of necessity, possibility, or likelihood that the utterance is true). Modal particles are common in Chinese languages and generally occur at the end of sentences, and so are commonly called sentence-final particles or utterance-final particles.

Guoyu employs some modal particles that are rare in Putonghua. Some are entirely unique to spoken, colloquial Taiwan Guoyu, and identical particles may also have different meanings in Putonghua and Guoyu. Conversely, particles that are common in Putonghua — particularly northern Putonghua, such as that spoken in Beijing — are very rare in Guoyu. Examples include 唄 (呗) bei, 嚜 me, and 罷了 (罢了) bàle.

啦 lā is a very common modal particle in Guoyu, which also appears in Putonghua with less frequency and always as a contraction of 了 le and 啊 a. In Guoyu, it has additional functions, which Lin (2014) broadly defines as "to mark an explicit or implicit adjustment" by the speaker to a given claim or assessment. In more specific terms, this use includes expression of impatience or displeasure (a, below); an imperative, such as a suggestion or order, especially a persistent one (b), and rejection or refutation (c).

Wu (2006) argues lā is influenced by a similar la particle in Hokkien. (Unlike in Putonghua, Guoyu speakers will use lā immediately following le, as seen in (a).)

(a) Impatience or displeasure

睡覺了啦(Shuìjiāo le lā)！明天還要上課耶(Míngtiān hái yào shàng kè yē)！
Go to sleep already! [You] have to go to class tomorrow!

(b) Suggestion or order

A: 我真的(Wǒ zhēnde)吃飽(chī bǎo)了(le)！ I'm so full!
B: 不要客氣(Búyào kèqì)，再吃一碗(zài chī yī wǎn)啦(lā)！ Don't be so polite, have another bowl!

(c) Rejection or refutation

A: 他那麼早結婚(Tā nàme zǎo jiéhūn)，一定是懷孕了(yīdìng shì huáiyùn le)。 He married so early, it has to be [because of] a pregnancy.
B: 不可能啦(Bù kěnéng lā)。 There's no way.

Taiwan Guoyu has functionally adopted some particles from Hokkien. For example, the particle hoⁿh (Note: The Ministry of Education gives the original character for hoⁿh as 乎, a Classical Chinese particle.) [hɔ̃ʔ] functions in Hokkien as a particle indicating a question to which the speaker expects an affirmative answer (cf. English "..., all right?" or "..., aren't you?"). Among other meanings, when used in Taiwan Guoyu utterances, it can indicate that the speaker wishes for an affirmative response, or may mark an imperative.

==== Loan words and transliteration ====
Loan words may differ between Putonghua and Guoyu. Different characters or methods may also be chosen for transliteration (phonetic or semantic), and the number of characters may differ. In some cases, words may be loaned as transliterations in one dialect but not the other. Generally, Guoyu tends to imitate the form of Han Chinese names when transliterating foreign persons' names. (Note: Barack Obama is thus referred to as Ōubāmǎ 歐巴馬 as opposed to Àobāmǎ 奥巴马 in the mainland. Ōu is a common Han surname, while Ào is not (see list of common Chinese surnames).)

Examples of differing transliterations
English	Guoyu, traditional characters	Putonghua, simplified
Punk music	龐克(pángkè)	朋克(péngkè)
Reagan	雷根(Léigēn)	里根(Lǐgēn)
Obama	歐巴馬(Ōubāmǎ)	奥巴马(Àobāmǎ)
Blog	部落格(bùluògé)	博客(bókè)
Gundam	鋼彈(Gāngdàn)	高达(Gāodá)
Mercedes-Benz	梅賽德斯-賓士(Méisàidésī-Bīnshì)	梅赛德斯-奔驰(Méisàidésī-Bēnchí)

==== From Hokkien ====
Guoyu has borrowed words from Hokkien, such as 蕃薯 fānshǔ 'sweet potato' and 拜拜 bàibài 'to worship'. In Hokkien, the prefix 阿 a (Guoyu: ā) carries an affection or intimate tone when referring to people, and this has been adopted into Guoyu. Thus, words like 阿妹 āmèi 'younger sister' may be used instead of the standard 妹妹 mèimèi, and public figures like Tsai Ing-wen may be referred to as 阿英 Āyīng.

Whether these loans are pronounced with their Hokkien or Guoyu reading varies. In general, as a loan becomes more commonly recognized, it is more likely to be read as Guoyu. This may involve the transformation of characters into their Guoyu counterparts. For example, the Hokkien 烏白講 oo‑pe̍h kóng 'to talk nonsense' now exists in Guoyu as 黑白講 hēibáijiǎng (both literally translate as 'to talk black and white'; 烏 is 'black' in Hokkien, corresponding to 黑 in Guoyu). Some words may not be represented by well known characters and are instead written with English letters, such as Q, from the Hokkien word 𩚨 khiū, referring to a soft, chewy texture in foods. Some compound words or phrases may combine characters representing Hokkien and Guoyu words. (Note: Wu and Su (2014) give the example of "逗熱鬧" 'to join in the fun' in a 2014 Liberty Times headline. The Guoyu phrase is 凑熱鬧 còu rènào; the headline substituted the verb 凑 còu for the Hokkien verb 逗 (dòu, read tàu in Hokkien). The Hokkien word is 逗鬧熱 (Pe̍h-ōe-jī: tàu‑lāu‑jia̍t) (also written 鬥鬧熱))

==== From Japanese ====
Japanese in the early 20th century had a significant influence on modern Chinese vocabulary. The Japanese language saw the proliferation of neologisms to describe concepts, and terms learned through contact with the West in the Meiji and Taishō eras. Thus, the creation of words like 民主 minshu 'democracy', 革命 kakumei 'revolution' and 催眠 saimin 'hypnotize', which were then borrowed into Chinese and pronounced as Chinese words. Both Guoyu and Putonghua retain these words today.

Guoyu was also further influenced by Japanese. As a result of Imperial Japan's 50-year rule over Taiwan until 1945, Hokkien (and Hakka) borrowed extensively from Japanese, and Guoyu in turn borrowed some of these words from Hokkien, such that Japanese influence can be said to have come via Hokkien. For example, the Hokkien word 摃龜 (Peh-oe-ji: kòngku; [kɔŋ˥˩ku˥˥]) 'to lose completely', which has been borrowed into Guoyu, originates from Japanese sukonku (スコンク, 'skunk'), with the same meaning. Other examples of Guoyu loans from Japanese via Hokkien include 運將 yùnjiàng, 'driver, chauffeur', from 運ちゃん unchan and 歐巴桑 ōubāsāng, 'elderly woman', from おばあさん obāsan.

In general, Japanese loanwords are more widespread in Guoyu than Putonghua. Guoyu continues to borrow words from Japanese in the 21st century, especially among youth, for whom Japanese culture is particularly attractive.

== Grammar ==
The grammar of Guoyu is largely identical to Putonghua. As is the case with lexicon and phonology described above, salient grammatical differences from Putonghua often stem from the influence of Hokkien.

=== Perfective 有 yǒu ===
To mark the perfect verbal aspect, Guoyu employs 有 (yǒu) where 了 (le) would be used in the strictly standard form of the language. For instance, a Guoyu speaker may ask "你有看醫生嗎？" ("Have you seen a doctor?") whereas a Putonghua speaker would prefer "你看医生了吗？". This is due to the influence of Hokkien grammar, which uses 有 (ū) in a similar fashion.

In both Guoyu and Putonghua, 有没有 yǒuméiyǒu can precede a verb phrase to mark a perfective question, as in (1), and in Guoyu, this can be split (2):

(1) 你有沒有申請簽證？(Nǐ yǒuméiyǒu shēnqǐng qiānzhèng) ("Did you apply for a visa?")
(2) 你有申請簽證沒有？(Nǐ yǒu shēnqǐng qiānzhèng méiyǒu) (Guoyu only)

=== Auxiliary verbs ===
Another example of the influence of Hokkien grammar on Guoyu is the use of 會 huì as "to be" (a copula) before adjectives, in addition to the usual meanings "would" or "will". Compare typical ways to render "Are you hot?" and "I am not hot" in Putonghua, Guoyu, and Hokkien:

	"Are you hot?"	"I am not hot"
Putonghua	你 熱 不 (熱)? Nǐ rè bù (rè)?	我 不 熱。 Wǒ bù rè.
Guoyu	你 會 不 會 熱? Nǐ huì bù huì rè?	我 不 會 熱。 Wǒ bù huì rè.
Hokkien	你 會 熱 嘸? Lí ē joa̍h bô?	我 袂 熱。 (Note: 袂 bē is alternatively written with the nonstandard, which provides a clearer image of its grammatical function: it is a combination of a negator (勿) and 會.); Guá bē joa̍h.

The use of 會 to express "will" — as in 他會來嗎? Tā huì lái ma? 'Will he come?' — is also a notable feature of Guoyu. It is not necessarily considered ungrammatical in Putonghua, but is very rare. Sanders (1992), analyzing speech by groups of Mandarin speakers from Taipei and Beijing, found that the latter group never used 會 to mean 'will' in this manner spontaneously (preferring instead 他来吗? Tā lái ma?). For them, speakers of Mandarin from Taiwan may be perceived as overusing 會.

=== Compound (separable) verbs ===
Speakers of Guoyu may frequently avoid splitting separable verbs, a category of verb + object compound words that are split in certain grammatical contexts in standard usage. For example, the verb 幫忙 bāngmáng 'to help; to do a favor', is composed of bāng 'to help, assist' plus máng 'to be busy; a favor'. The word in Guoyu can take on a direct object without separation, which is ungrammatical in Putonghua: 我幫忙他 (我帮忙他) 'I help him', acceptable in Guoyu, must be rendered as 我幫他個忙 (我帮他个忙). This is not true of every separable verb in Guoyu, and prescriptive texts still opt to treat these verbs as separable.
