= Haechi =

Haechi may refer to:

- Xiezhi, a legendary creature in Chinese and Korean mythology and Seoul mascot
- Haechi (TV series), a 2019 South Korean television series
- Haechi (comics), a character in Marvel Comics
