= Xiezhi =

Chinese mythological beast

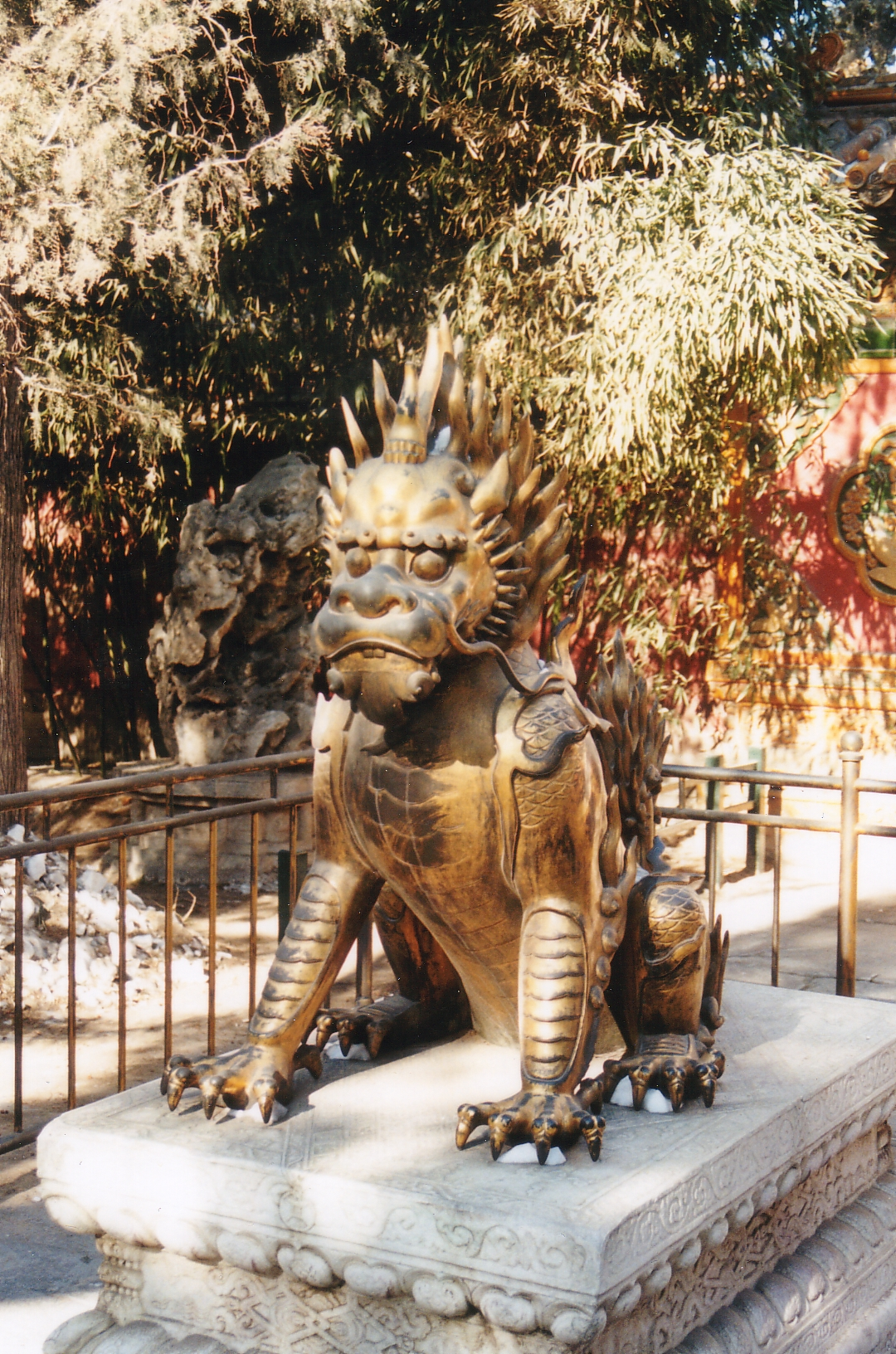
- A xiezhi in the Forbidden City in Beijing, China

Chinese name
- Traditional Chinese: 獬豸
- Simplified Chinese: 獬豸
Transcriptions
Standard Mandarin
- Hanyu Pinyin: xiezhi (xièzhì)
- Wade–Giles: hsieh-chih
- IPA: [ɕjê.ʈʂî]

Vietnamese name
- Vietnamese alphabet: giải trãi
- Chữ Hán: 獬豸

Korean name
- Hangul: 해태
- Hanja: 獬豸
Transcriptions
- Revised Romanization: Haetae

Japanese name
- Kanji: 獬豸
- Hiragana: かいち
Transcriptions
- Romanization: kaichi

The xiezhi (獬豸 (Note: Other variants are 解豸, 解𧋈, 獬廌, 解廌, 觟𧣾, 觟䚦); xièzhì < Eastern Han Chinese *gɛʔ-ḍɛʔ) is a mythical creature of Chinese origin found throughout Sinospheric legends. It resembles an ox or goat, with thick dark fur covering its body, bright eyes and a single long horn on its forehead. It has great intellect and understands human speech. The xiezhi possesses the innate ability to distinguish right from wrong and when it finds corrupt officials, it will ram them with its horn and devour them. It is known as a symbol of justice.

== History ==
According to legend, the xiezhi, was a single-horned sheep or goat (Note: Given as "one-horned sheep" (Chinese: 一角之羊; pinyin: yījiǎo zhī yáng) in the original Chinese. Forke rendered this "the monoceros [hsieh-chai] is a goat with one horn", Karlgren as "kie-chai is a ram with one horn"; Karlgren and Forke read 觟𧣾/獬豸 as hsieh-chai and kie-chai respectively, but hsieh-chih is the Wade–Giles romanization according to references otherwise consulted.) which had power to divine the guilt or innocence of a person. Gao Yao, the minister of justice for the legendary Emperor Shun employed the beast during criminal proceedings and he would command the sheep to ram (head-butt) the accused. The beast would ram the guilty, but spare the innocent. The account appears in Wang Chong, Lunheng (80 AD). (Note: Wang Chong, Lunheng (in Chinese), cited by Yang (1983)[1937], cited as source on xiezhi by Wang Tao (in English).)

In the same work (Lunheng), the legend is prefaced the remark that public offices are painted with the images of the beast and the minister.

As a symbol of traditional Chinese law, xiezhi has been promoted by the Chinese dynasties. The judicial hat (法冠) was also referred to as the xiezhi after the mythical sheep/ox. (Note: Cui Hao (崔浩; d. 450), cited in the annotative work Shiji Suoyin ("Seeking the Obscure in the Grand Scribe's Records").) The xiezhi hat was part of the attire of censors (yushi) into the 8th century during the Tang period, especially for an impeachment trial.

Legend has it that during the Spring and Autumn period and the Warring States period, King Wen of Chu once obtained a xiezhi and put its image on his head and then the xiezhi crown became a fashion in the State of Chu. Law enforcement officials in the Qin dynasty also wore such crowns, as did the Han dynasty, which inherited the Qin system. By the Eastern Han dynasty, images of the xiezhi became an indispensable ornament in the Xie Men, and the XieZhi crown was titled on the law. Therefore, law enforcement officials were called xiezhi.

Mentions of the xiezhi in Chinese literature can be traced back to the Han dynasty. "Rhapsody on the Imperial Park" (上林賦), Sima Xiangru mentions the xiezhi 解豸/解廌 "sagacious stag" among the prey in the year-end barricade hunt staged by the Son of Heaven. Scholar Yáng Fú (楊孚) (Note: Not to be confused to the official Yáng Fù (楊阜) who flourished during the late Eastern Han and Cao Wei eras) described the xiezhi 獬豸 in his treatise Yiwu Zhi as a "righteous beast, which rams the wrongful party when it sees a fight and bites the wrongful party when it hears an argument". It is described in the Shuowen Jiezi as being "a cattle-like beast with one horn; in ancient times. It settled disputes by ramming the party at fault".

As an inherently just beast, the xiezhi was used as a symbol of justice and law. The Censorate of the Ming and Qing eras, who were responsible for the monitoring of the civil service, wore the xiezhi as a badge of office. Among the common folk, the image of the xiezhi was believed to dispel evil spirits; a xiezhi might be carved on a lock to frighten off evil spirits. Similarly, military policemen of the Republic of China wear badges bearing the xiezhi and it is engraved on the gavels in the law courts of the People's Republic of China.

== Etymology and Identity ==
Linguist and Sinologist Axel Schuessler reconstructs the Late Han pronunciation of this mythological animal's name (解豸 ~ 解廌) as *gɛʔ-ḍɛʔ. Noting that in Zuo Zhuan′s chapter "Duke Xuan′s 17th year", "豸 is supposedly a graphical loan for 解 'understand'", (Note: 解 is the gloss for 豸; zhì provided by 3rd century CE's classicist Du Yu. Schuessler (2007) apparently interprets it as 解; xiè "understand, distinguish"; yet there are other interpretations: such as "solution" by Ministry of Education Mandarin Chinese Dictionary or "decision" or "clarity" by Bernard Karlgren.) he suspects the gloss 解; xiè - when misunderstood - "ended up as a pre-syllable in the animal name" 豸 ~ 廌 and "may be responsible for the belief that this animal could tell straight from crooked, right from wrong."

Schuessler points out that the animal name 豸 ~ 廌 (Note: In his 2009 book Minimal Old Chinese and Later Han Chinese, Schuessler treats 豸 and 廌 as variants of each other. Earlier, Guangyun also treated them likewise.) is attested as early as in the Shang period's oracle bones and once referred to real animals, (Note: See also Janhunen (2011: 192–194) and Schwartz (2018: 40–42).) i.e. small deer which were hunted by the Shang kings yet whose identity has been almost forgotten. He then proposes an Austroasiatic etymology by comparing 廌 (Old Chinese: *dreʔ) (Note: Whence Eastern Han Chinese *ḍɛ^{B} > Middle Chinese *ḍje^{B}, *ḍaɨ^{B} > Standard Chinese zhì, zhài.) to Old Mon drāy (> Burmese ဒရယ် da.rai "hog deer"), Old Khmer drāy > Khmer ទ្រាយ triəy "stag" and Stieng [Biat] draːi "swamp deer", whose Proto-Mon-Khmer ancestor was reconstructed by Shorto as *draaj (#1508).

Linguist Juha Janhunen (2011) counts the "real goat-like animal (perhaps an antelope)" underlying 廌; zhì as one among many sources (besides the rhinoceros and others) which inspired the 麒麟; qílín and notes that both the zhi and qilin were one-horned animals which could tell right from wrong. However, Janhunen thinks that the graphs 豸 and 廌, rather than being variants of each other, might have denoted different animals "but they became confused to the extent that both can be used in reference to the same range of vague folkloric and mythical beasts". Indeed, Shuowen Jiezi describes the 豸 as ambush predators, not one-horned cattle-like ungulates. Valenti (2018) proposes a possible paraonomastic link between 豸, OC:*‍[d]reʔ, mod. zhì and 踟, OC:*‍[d]re, mod. chí [walk hesitatingly].

Schwartz (2018) identifies the 廌 as the antelope (羚羊; língyáng).

== Homage ==
In 2022, a species of prehistoric giraffoid artiodactyl from early Miocene China, Discokeryx xiezhi, was named after the xiezhi in reference to a single bony plate on top of its skull which bore a resemblance to the horn of the mythical creature.

== In other places ==
=== Japan ===
In Japan, it is known as kaichi (獬豸), also sometimes referred to as a shin'yō (神羊; lit. 'divine sheep'). The kaichi is described as similar to a lion with one horn on the top of its head.

=== Korea ===
The xiezhi is known as haetae (Korean: 해태) in Korea. According to Korean records, the haetae has a muscular leonine body covered with sharp scales, a bell in its neck and a horn on its forehead. It lives in the frontier areas of Manchuria.

In Joseon-dynasty Korea, the haetae was believed to protect against fire disasters. Sculptures of haetae were used in architecture (for example, at Gyeongbok Palace) to ward off fire. A cartoon haetae named Haechi is the city mascot of Seoul.

In English, the haetae may be called "the unicorn-lion."

== Gallery ==
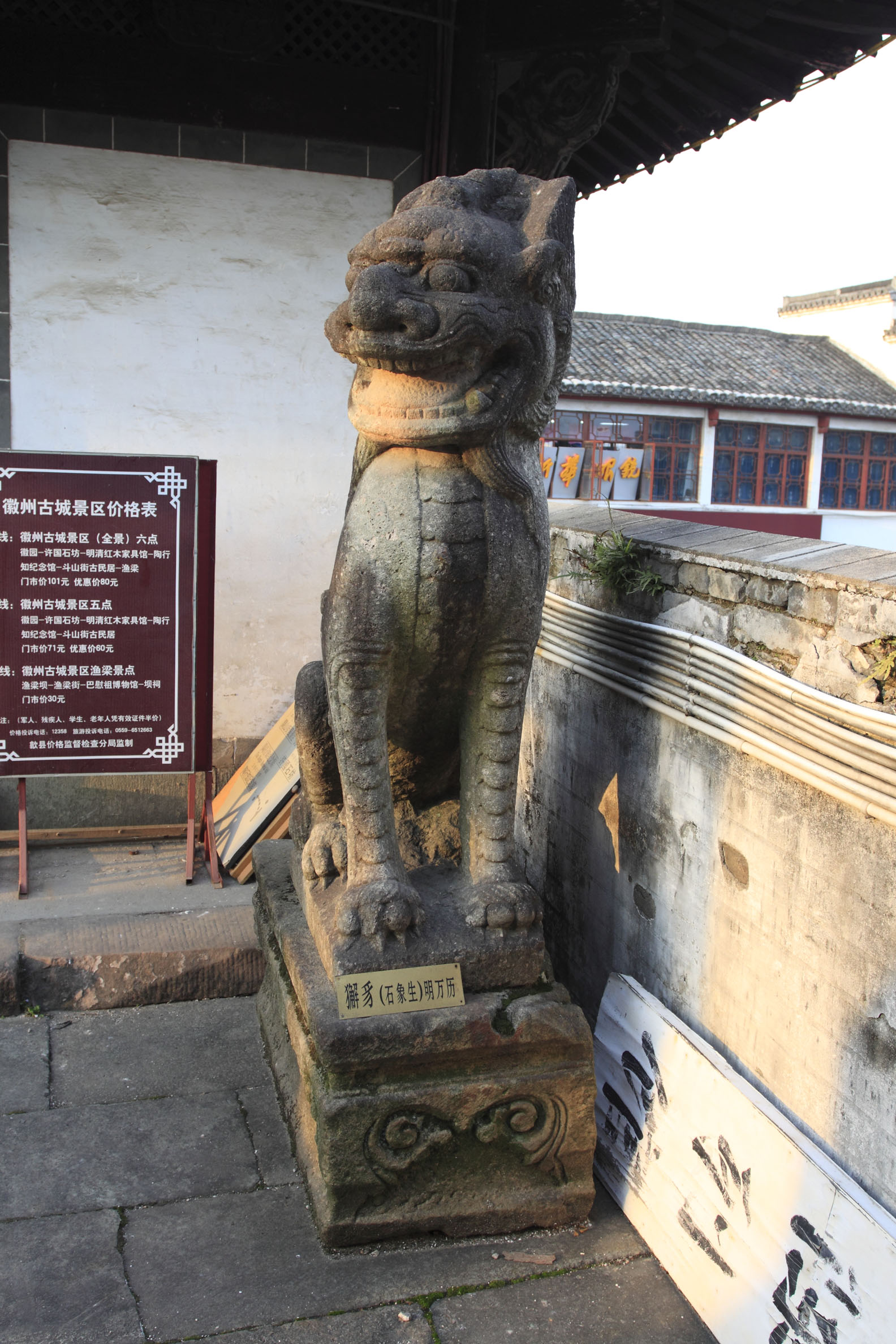
A xiezhi in Anhui Province, China

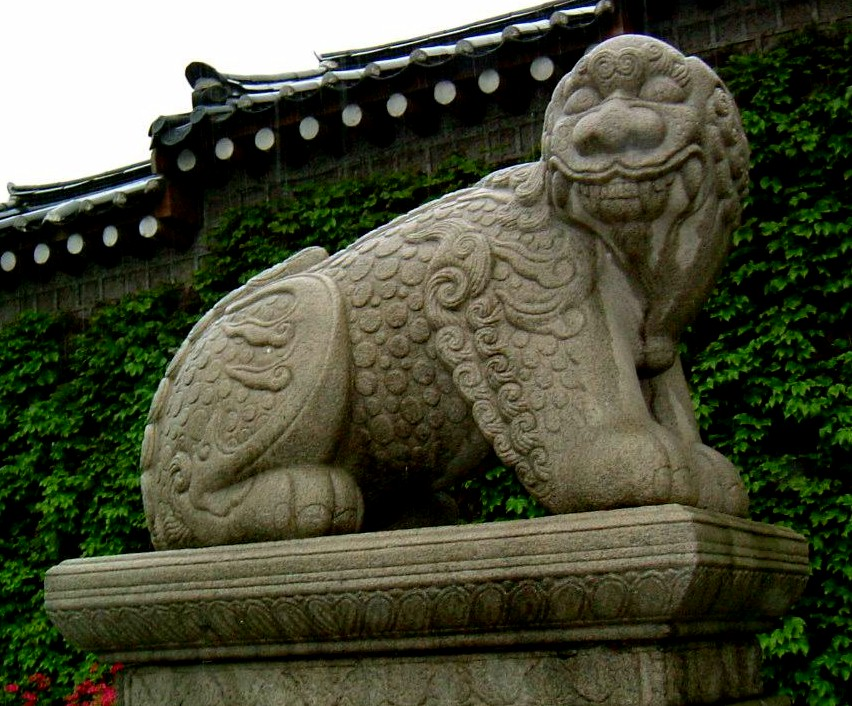
A haetae at a Korean palace

== See also ==
- Bixi – Creature in Chinese mythology
- Chinese guardian lions – Chinese statues of lion-like creatures
- Pixiu – Chinese mythical hybrid creature
- Qilin – Legendary creature in Chinese mythology
- Unicorn – Legendary single-horned horse-like creature
