= Sentence-final particle =

Words that qualify sentences

Sentence-final particles, including modal particles and interactional particles, are minimal lexemes (words) that occur at the end of a sentence and that do not carry referential meaning, but may relate to linguistic modality, register or other pragmatic effects. Sentence-final particles are common in Chinese, including particles such as Mandarin le 了, ne 呢, ba 吧, ou 哦, a 啊, la 啦, ya 呀, and ma 嗎/吗, and Cantonese lo 囉 and ge 嘅. These particles act as qualifiers of the clause or sentence they end. Sentence-final particles are also present in Japanese and many East Asian languages, such as Thai, and especially in languages that have undergone heavy Sino-Tibetan influence, such as the Monguor languages.

== Examples ==
=== Chinese ===
Yuen Ren Chao has described sentence-final particles as "phrase suffixes": just as a word suffix is in construction with the word preceding it, a sentence-final particle or phrase suffix is "in construction with a preceding phrase or sentence, though phonetically closely attached to the syllable immediately preceding it". According to Chao, the sentence-final particle is phonetically close to the last word before it, but syntactically it is equidistant from every word in the whole predicate.

While sentence-final particles usually do not carry meaning themselves or denote anything explicit, they may be derived from words that do carry meaning when they occur in other contexts and serve different functions.

All of the sentence-final particles of Standard Chinese are unstressed and, unlike most syllables in the language, do not carry tone.

- le (了): Expressing a completed action (could be in the past, present, or future, depending on time markers), or a change in state.
- ba (吧): Soliciting approval, softening an imperative or giving an expression, could also express mocking, sarcasm, or passive aggressiveness depending on tone and context.
- ou (哦): Adds friendliness or intimacy, used frequently after warnings.
- ma (嘛): Expresses that the speaker believes something is obvious or simple, sometimes signifying frustration or impatience. Can also be used to intensify a command or suggestion.
- a (啊) or ya (呀): Expresses excitement or emphasis. Can be used in a question. The combination le a may be contracted as la (啦).
- ne (呢): Question particle that elicits elaboration on a topic previously discussed. Can also be used to soften a question.
- ma (嗎/吗): Forms a tag question.

A major use of sentence-final particles in Mandarin Chinese specifically is thought to be as a signal of the speaker's attitude, the intended force of the statement to which the particle is attached, and "how the utterance is to be taken by the hearer." For example, the addition of a particle may soften the tone of a question that might sound presumptuous or inappropriate without the particle. As such, sentence-final particles in this sense often perform an interpersonal function, rather than a grammatical one. Nevertheless, there are cases in which sentence-final particles do perform grammatical functions, such as Mandarin ma 嗎/吗, the "question particle," which changes the grammatical mood of a sentence to interrogative. Likewise, even though sentence-final particles can usually be omitted from a sentence without making the sentence ungrammatical or changing its meaning, some particles do contain information critical to the interpretation of an utterance's meaning, such as Mandarin le 了.

=== Japanese ===
In Japanese, there are many sentence-final particles that are used in formal as well as colloquial speech. Some examples include:

- か ka: question. It turns a declarative sentence into a question.
- っけ kke: doubt. Used when one is unsure of something. For example, 昨日だったっけ？ (kinō datta kke), "Was it yesterday?". Often used when talking to oneself.
- な na: emotion. Used when one wants to express a personal feeling. May be used to state a fact in which one has emotional investment, to express one's admiration or emotional excitement, to soften an imperative, or to encourage agreement, as a mild imperative.
- なあ nā: a lengthened version of the above, expresses strong emotion, either to encourage agreement, as above, or to express one's desires, e.g. 寿司を食べたいなぁ (sushi wo tabetai naa), "I want to eat sushi (so badly right now!)".
- ね ne: agreement. Used when the speaker wants to verify or otherwise show agreement, reach consensus, or build solidarity with the listener.
- の no: emphatic/informal interrogative/indirect imperative. May be used to form informal questions, or to give some sort of emphasis to one's statement. Depending on intonation and context, it may soften a statement (particularly in women's language), or to strongly assert one's belief in something. In this sense, it may also act as an indirect imperative, by indicating what the speaker believes should happen, thus, what the listener is expected to do.
- さ sa: casualness, assertiveness. Contrasts with ne in that, where ne helps build solidarity and agreement, sa is often used to assert the speaker's own ideas or opinions. It is often used repeatedly in conversation to retain a listener's attention.
- わ wa: soft declarative or emphatic. Used primarily by women, this particle has a meaning similar to yo, but it is less assertive.
- よ yo: assertive. It means that you are asserting what preceded the particle as information you are confident in, particularly when supplying information the listener is believed not to know.
- ぜ ze: informal hortative/emphatic. Used to push someone to do something, or to remind them of something. In certain contexts, it can carry a threatening overtone.
- ぞ zo: assertive, emphatic. Used to strongly assert the speaker's decisions and opinions, and serves to discourage dissent or protest.

=== Sinhala ===
Sinhala employs a rich set of sentence-final particles that occur across formal and colloquial registers. These particles contribute a range of interpersonal, evidential, and epistemic meanings, and many of them are obligatory for signalling the speaker’s stance toward the proposition or the addressee. Common sentence-final particles include the following:

- ද da: interrogative. Marks a polar question by attaching to a declarative statement. E.g., "ඔයා එනවා" (oyā enavā) "You are coming" → "ඔයා එනවා ද?" (oyā enavā da?) "Are you coming?"
- ලු lu: reportive evidential. Indicates that the speaker is reporting second-hand information in the statement, often implying reduced epistemic commitment. E.g., "එයා එනවා" (eyā enavā) "S/he is coming" → "එයා එනවා ලු" (eyā enavā lu) "I’ve heard that s/he is coming"
- නෙ/ නේ ne / nē: evaluative/ confirmation seeking/ solidarity building. Used when the speaker expects the addressee to share, confirm, or ratify the proposition; frequently strengthens common-ground alignment. E.g., "එයා එනවා" (eyā enavā) "S/he is coming" → "එයා එනවා නෙ" (eyā enavā ne?) "S/he is coming, right?"
- යැ yæ: dubitative. Expresses doubt, suspicion, or weak epistemic commitment on the part of the speaker. E.g., "එයා එනවා" (eyā enavā) "S/he is coming" → "එයා එනවා යැ" (eyā enavā yæ?) "I doubt if s/he is coming."
- තමා/ තමයි tamā/ tamai: exhaustivity. Indicates that the appended statement exhausts the possible set of alternatives; often conveys “it is X (and not anything else).” E.g., "එයා එනවා" (eyā enavā) "S/he is coming" → "එයා එනවා තමයි" (eyā enavā tamai) "She is coming indeed"
- විතරයි witarai: exclusivity. Restricts the statement to a minimal interpretation, similar to English “only.” E.g., "එයා එනවා" (eyā enavā) "S/he is coming" C "එයා එනවා විතරයි. වෙන මුකුත් කරන්නේ නැහැ" (eyā enavā witari) "S/he is just coming; she is not going to do anything else."
- කො ko: intensifier/ downtoner. Strengthens imperatives, often adding urgency, or softens commissives by signalling lowered speaker commitment. E.g., "අනේ එන්න" (anē enna) "Please come" → "අනේ එන්න කො" (anē enna ko) "Come, will you!" vs. "මං මොනවා හරි කරන්නම්" (maṁ monawa hari karannam) "I'll do something (about it)" → "මං මොනවා හරි කරන්නම් කො" (maṁ monawa hari karannam ko) "I'll try do something (about it)"

Some of these forms occur with phonologically conditioned alternations (e.g., ne ~ nē, tamā ~ tamai), and their pragmatic profiles vary with genre, region, and the formality of the interaction.

=== English ===
English also has some words and phrases that act somewhat like sentence final particles, but primarily only in colloquial speech. However, there are others, called tag questions, which are less colloquial and can be used for any situation. All are generally discourse particles rather than modal particles. For example:

- "man" in "Don't do it, man."
- "right" in "The blue one, right?"
- "no" in "You want to go, no?"
- "don't you" in "You want to, don't you?"
- "are they" in "They're not hurt, are they?"
- "aren't they" in "They're here, aren't they?"
- "is it" in "The plate isn't broken, is it?"
- "isn't it" in "The plane is here, isn't it?"

All but the first are tag questions. Notice how when the main sentence is affirmative, the tag question is negative, and vice versa.

=== Portuguese ===
Portuguese uses several sentence-final particles. For example:

- "né": mainly used to seek confirmation or agreement. It may also be used to denote sarcasm or to express that a statement is obvious.
- "sim": mainly used to emphasize a statement. It is often translated as "do" as in: eu sei, sim. 'I do know.'
- "lá": used with some verbs to emphasize a negation as in sei lá. 'I don't know.'
- "já": has many different uses; one of them is to express surprise.
- "ó": rarely used in writing, but common in speech. Used to draw the listener's attention to something.
- "aí": has many different uses, one of them is to soften a request or to make a sentence sound more colloquial.

=== Spanish ===
In the same way that certain words and phrases are used as sentence final particles above in the section on English (as discourse particles), some Spanish words and phrases can be used this way as well; once again, these are usually called tag questions. For example:

- "verdad" (right) in "Te gustan los libros, ¿verdad?" (You (informal) like books, right?)
- "no" (no) in "Le toca pasar la aspiradora, ¿no?" (It's your (formal) turn to vacuum, no?)
- "no es verdad" (isn't that right) in "Eres de Perú, ¿no es verdad?" (You're (informal) from Peru, isn't that right?)

Note that in Spanish, the question marks are placed around the tag question, and not around the entire sentence (although English only uses the single final question mark, it is implied that the entire sentence, and not just the tag, is the question).
