= Modal particle =

Concept in linguistics

In linguistics, modal particles are a type of grammatical particle used in a sentence to add extra meaning, particularly in spoken language. Modal particles have various functions, including adding emotion or emphasis, or to express how sentence content is grounded in common knowledge between the speaker and participants.

Languages that use many modal particles in their spoken form include Dutch, Danish, German, Hungarian, Russian, Telugu, Nepali, Norwegian, Indonesian, Sinitic languages, Japanese and Vietnamese. Modal particles are often context-dependent and difficult to translate.

== Examples ==
=== German ===
The German particle ja is used to indicate that a sentence contains information that is obvious or already known to both the speaker and the hearer. The sentence Der neue Teppich ist rot means "The new carpet is red". Der neue Teppich ist ja rot may thus mean "As we are both aware, the new carpet is red", which would typically be followed by some conclusion from this fact. However, if the speaker says the same thing upon first seeing the new carpet, the meaning is "I'm seeing that the carpet is obviously red", which would typically express surprise. In speech the latter meaning can be inferred from a strong emphasis on rot and higher-pitched voice.

=== Dutch ===
In Dutch, modal particles are frequently used to add mood to a sentence, especially in spoken language. For instance:

- Politeness
  - Kan je even het licht aandoen? (literally: "Can you briefly turn on the light?" with the added "even" indicating that it will not take you long to do so.)
  - Weet u misschien waar het station is? ("Do you perhaps know where the train station is?")
    Misschien here denotes a very polite and friendly request: "Could you tell me the way to the train station, please?"
  - Wil je soms wat drinken? ("Do you occasionally want a drink?")
    Soms here conveys a sincere interest in the answer to a question: "I'm curious if you would like to drink something?"
- Frustration
  - Doe het toch maar. ("Do it nevertheless, however.")
    Toch here indicates anger and maar lack of consideration: "I don't really care what you think, just do it!"
  - Ben je nou nog niet klaar? ("Are you still not ready yet?")
    Nou here denotes loss of patience: "Don't tell me you still haven't finished!"

Modal particles may be combined to indicate mood in a very precise way. In this combination of six modal particles the first two emphasise the command, the second two are toning down the command, and the final two transform the command into a request:

- Luister dan nu toch maar eens even. ("Listen + at this moment + now + just + will you? + only once + only for a while", meaning: "Just listen, will you?")

Because of this progressive alteration these modal particles cannot move around freely when stacked in this kind of combination. However, some other modal particles can be added to the equation on any given place, such as gewoon, juist, trouwens. Also, replacing the "imperative weakener" maar by gewoon (indicating normalcy or acceptable behavior), changes the mood of the sentence completely, now indicating utter frustration with someone who is failing to do something very simple:

- Luister dan nou toch gewoon eens even! ("For once, can you just simply listen for a minute?")

== See also ==
- Sentence-final particle
