= Ministry of Education Mandarin Chinese Dictionary =

The Ministry of Education Mandarin Chinese Dictionary (《教育部國語辭典》) refers to official dictionaries of Mandarin, specifically Taiwanese Mandarin, issued and edited by the Ministry of Education (Taiwan). Officially issued online versions of the dictionary include the Concised Mandarin Chinese Dictionary and the Revised Mandarin Chinese Dictionary (《重編國語辭典修定本》).

The Revised Mandarin Chinese Dictionary includes 156,710 entries, and was published in 1994.
