= Indianapolis Marriott Downtown =

High-rise hotel in Indianapolis, Indiana, US

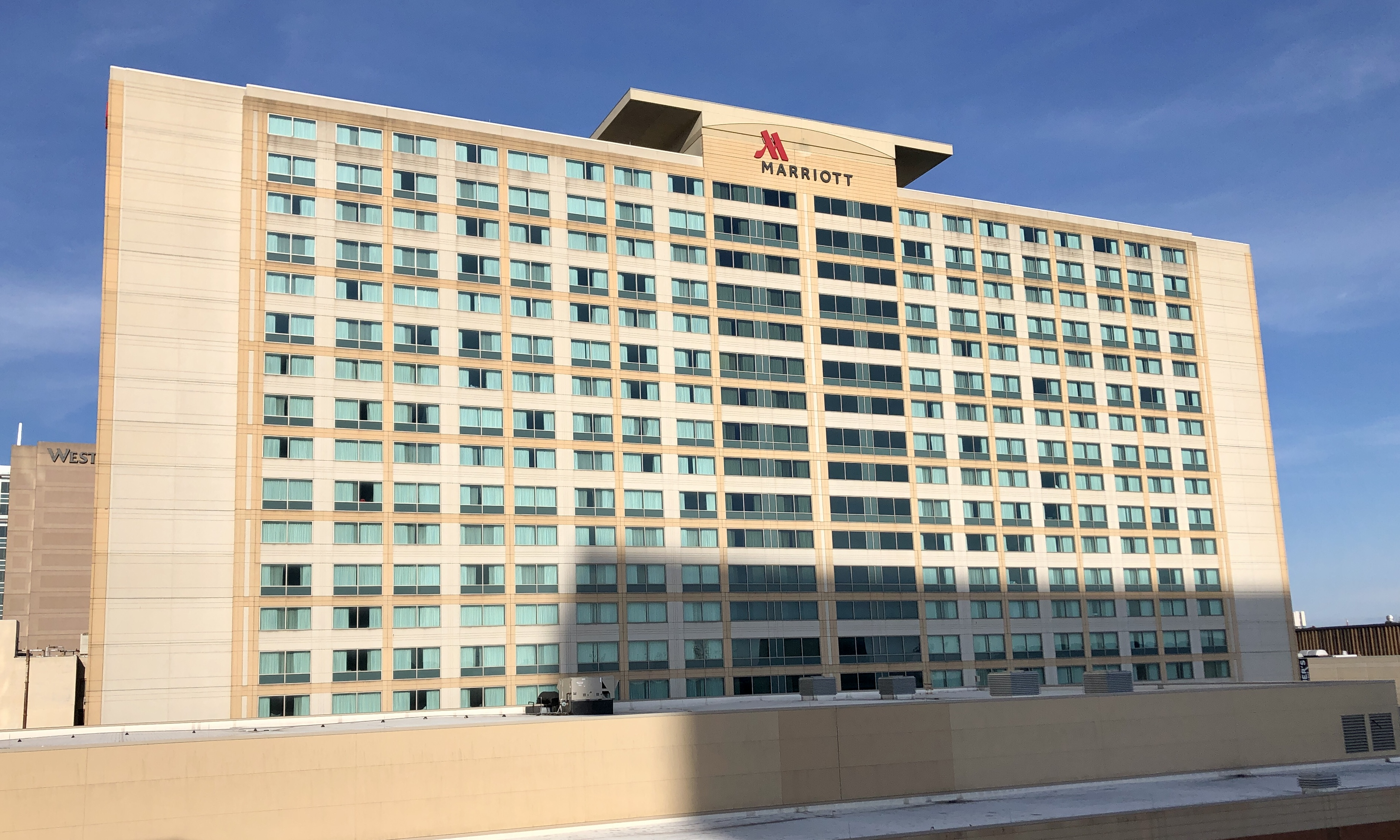
- Indianapolis Marriott Downtown in 2022
- Interactive map of the Indianapolis Marriott Downtown area

General information
- Location: 350 West Maryland Street; Indianapolis, Indiana
- Coordinates: 39°45′57″N 86°09′53″W
- Opening: February 26, 2001; 25 years ago
- Owner: White Lodging
- Operator: Marriott Hotels & Resorts

Height
- Height: 214 ft (65 m)

Technical details
- Floor count: 19

Design and construction
- Architects: Hellmuth Obata & Kassabaum; Ratio Architects, Inc.

Other information
- Number of rooms: 638
- Number of suites: 12
- Number of restaurants: 4
- Parking: 300 spaces

Website
- Official hotel website

Indianapolis Marriott Downtown is a high-rise hotel in Indianapolis, Indiana. It was completed in 2001 and has 19 floors. It was the largest hotel in Indiana until surpassed by the JW Marriott Indianapolis in 2011. The Indianapolis Marriott Downtown features 650 guest rooms and 40,000 square feet (3,700 m^{2}) of meeting/event space spread over 33 rooms.

According to the Indianapolis Business Journal, the Indianapolis Marriott Downtown has 365 full-time employees and was last renovated in 2017. As of 2020, four dining options were located in the hotel, including Conner's Kitchen + Bar, Rye Bar, Loaf + Vine Market, and Starbucks.

== See also ==
- List of tallest buildings in Indianapolis
