= 220 Meridian =

High-rise mixed-use building in Indianapolis, Indiana, U.S.

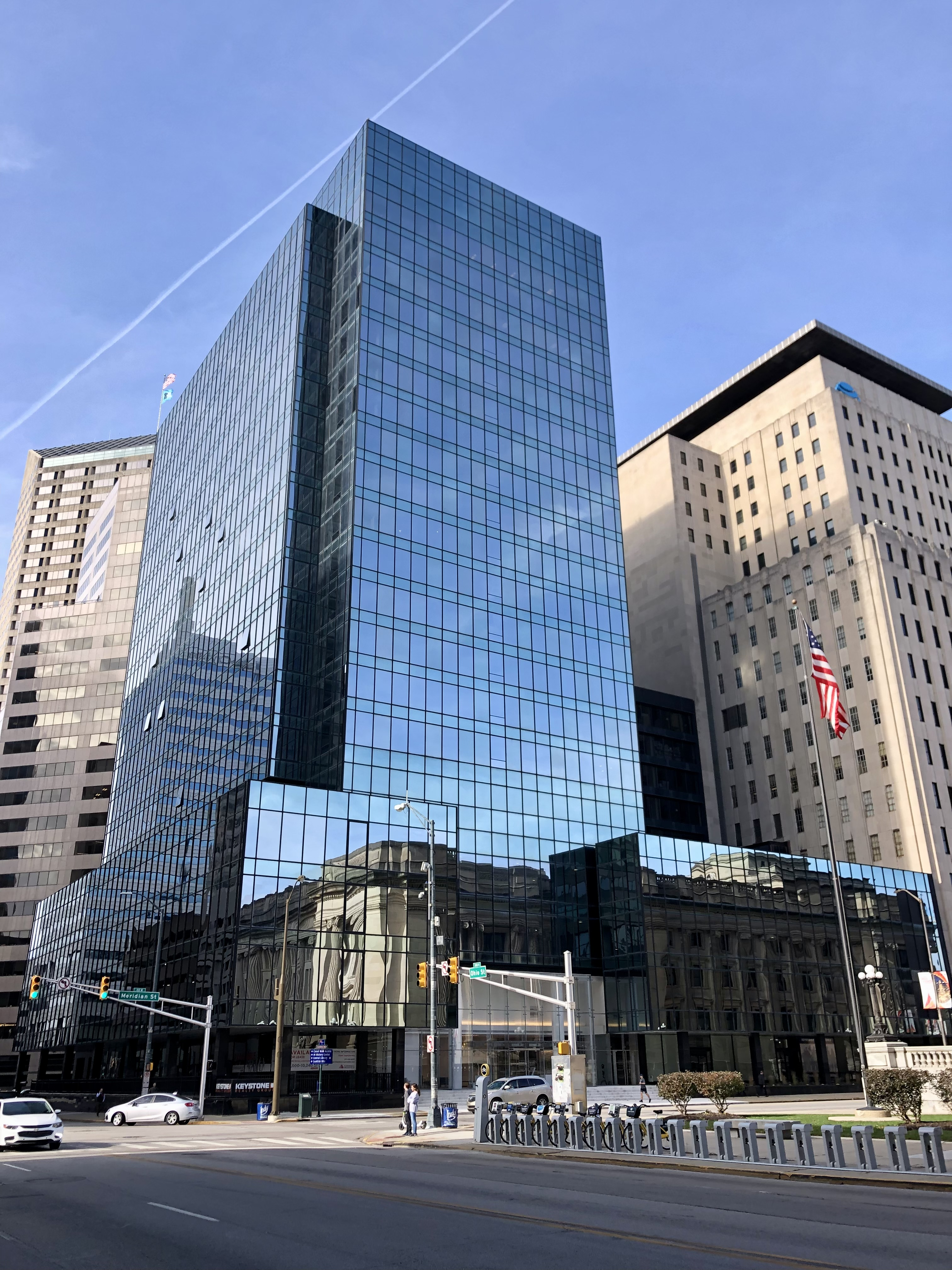

General information
- Type: Mixed-use
- Location: 220 North Meridian Street; Indianapolis, Indiana, U.S.
- Coordinates: 39°46′13″N 86°09′31″W
- Completed: 1974

Height
- Roof: 284 ft (87 m)

Technical details
- Floor count: 23

The 220 Meridian, formerly known as the AT&T 220 Building, is a 23-floor high rise located at 220 North Meridian Street in Indianapolis, Indiana. It was completed in 1974 when it served as the headquarters of Indiana Bell.

It is connected with the 22-story AT&T Building, located just to the north at 240 North Meridian Street, and both buildings housed the Indiana headquarters for AT&T. The AT&T 220 Building was sold to Cleveland-based Geis Properties in 2013 for $16.5 million.

In 2017, the building was purchased by Keystone Realty Group which has proposed spending $80 million to convert it to mixed-use with restaurants, office space, apartments, and parking.

The building has won several awards including the AIA Indiana design award, Citation award.

== See also ==
- List of tallest buildings in Indianapolis
- List of tallest buildings in Indiana
