= Dean White (businessman) =

American businessman (1923–2016)

- Born: Dean Victor White; May 25, 1923; Norfolk, Nebraska, U.S.
- Died: September 14, 2016 (aged 93); Crown Point, Indiana, U.S.
- Occupation: Businessman
- Spouse: Barbara White
- Children: 4, including Bruce W. White

Dean Victor White (May 25, 1923 – September 14, 2016) was an American billionaire businessman.

== Early life ==
White was born in Norfolk, Nebraska, on May 25, 1923, and grew up in Crown Point, Indiana. His father challenged him to "make a million dollars by your 40th birthday". White claimed that he'd "missed, at the most, 12 days of work since 1946."

== Career ==
In 1946, he joined his father's billboard business, Whiteco Advertising Company, and took over in 1952. White sold the company to Chancellor for $960 million in 1998. As of September 2016, he had a net worth of $2.5 billion.

A major Republican donor, White donated $1 million to American Crossroads in the 2012 United States presidential election. He supported numerous Indiana Republicans, including Brian Bosma, and also donated money to the House Republican Campaign Committee of Indiana.

== Personal life ==
He and his wife Barbara had four children, Bruce, Chris, Craig and Cindy. Bruce White headed up White Lodging and sat on the boards of the University of Chicago Hospitals and the Indiana Economic Development Corporation. Dean White died on September 14, 2016, at the age of 93. The Dean and Barbara White Family Foundation has supported the Indiana State Museum.

== See also ==
- List of billionaires
