= James Elias Olson =

American businessperson (1925 – 1988)

James Elias Olson (December 3, 1925 – April 18, 1988) was an American business executive who served as the chief executive officer (CEO) and later chairman of the American Telephone and Telegraph (AT&T).

== Early life and education ==
Olson was born in Devils Lake, North Dakota, to a father who was a barber and mother who was a schoolteacher. He earned a commerce degree from the University of North Dakota in 1950.

== Career ==
Olson began his career in the telecommunications industry with a summer job at Northwestern Bell Telephone Company, which led to a lifelong career at AT&T. Olson became the president of Indiana Bell in 1972 and later served as president of Illinois Bell

In 1977, Olson was appointed as AT&T's executive vice president and was elected as vice-chairman in 1979.

During his tenure at AT&T, Olson led the company through the 1984 divestiture of the Bell telephone companies. He was involved in restructuring efforts, which included cost-cutting measures and the reorganization of AT&T's computer division.

In 1986, Olson was elected as the chairman of AT&T, a position he held until his death in 1988.
