= 360 Market Square =

High-rise residential building in Indianapolis, Indiana, U.S.

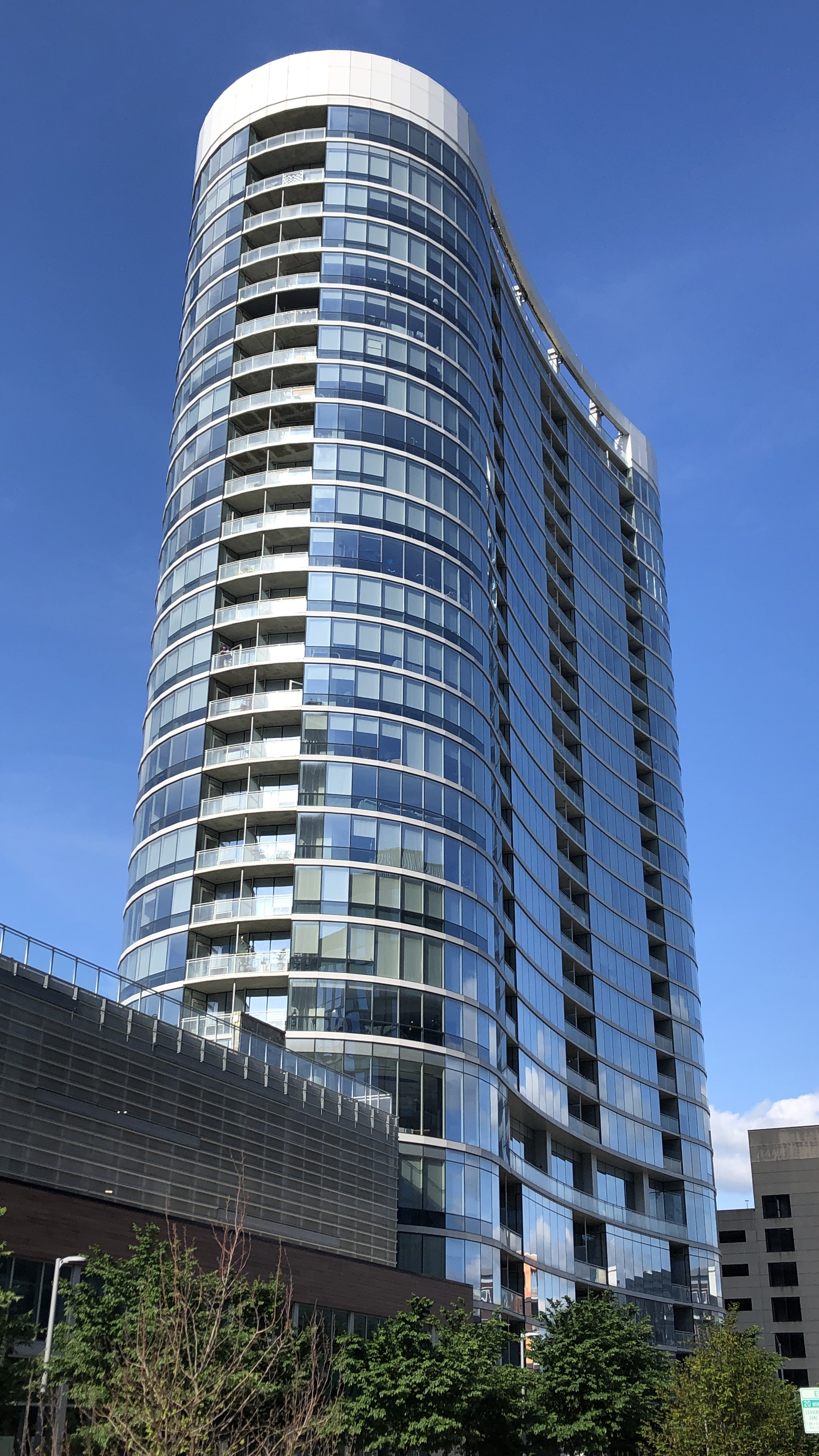
- 360 Market Square in 2022
- Interactive map of the 360 Market Square area

General information
- Status: Completed
- Type: Residential apartments
- Location: 360 East Market Street; Indianapolis, Indiana 46204; United States
- Coordinates: 39°46′6.9″N 86°9′4.4″W
- Groundbreaking: February 16, 2015; 11 years ago
- Construction started: June 2015; 10 years ago
- Opened: March 2018; 7 years ago

Height
- Height: 290.5 ft (89 m)

Technical details
- Floor count: 27
- Floor area: 648,561 sq ft (60,253.3 m^{2})

Design and construction
- Architecture firm: RTKL Associates
- Developer: Flaherty & Collins Properties
- Main contractor: Lendlease

Other information
- Number of units: 292

Website
- 360marketsquare.com

360 Market Square, previously known as Market Square Tower, is a residential skyscraper in downtown Indianapolis, Indiana. 360 Market Square stands on the northern portion of the block formerly home to Market Square Arena. The 27-story building is 290.5 feet (88.5 m) tall and features 648,561 sq ft (60,253.3 m^{2}) of floor space. It is the third tallest residential building in Indianapolis (after Riley Towers I and II) and is the 15th tallest building in the city overall. 360 Market Square includes a 2,000 sq ft (190 m^{2}) ground-level Tinker Coffee, a 40,000 sq ft (3,700 m^{2}) Whole Foods, and 525-space parking garage. The project cost totaled US$121 million.

The City of Indianapolis contributed $5.6 million in land for the project and expended $17 million in tax-increment financing money for infrastructure. City officials were highly engaged in the building's design, requiring a curvilinear building that would include a grocery store.

The project experienced a series of setbacks during construction. Contaminated soil, structural problems, and contractor payment disputes delayed the tower's opening by over a year. The project's height was also shortened following the design phase. Initially, 360 Market Square was set to be the ninth tallest building in Indianapolis and the tallest residential building in Indiana.

== See also ==
- Market East
- List of tallest buildings in Indianapolis
- List of tallest buildings in Indiana
