= Hyatt Regency Indianapolis =

High-rise mixed-use building in Indianapolis, Indiana, U.S.

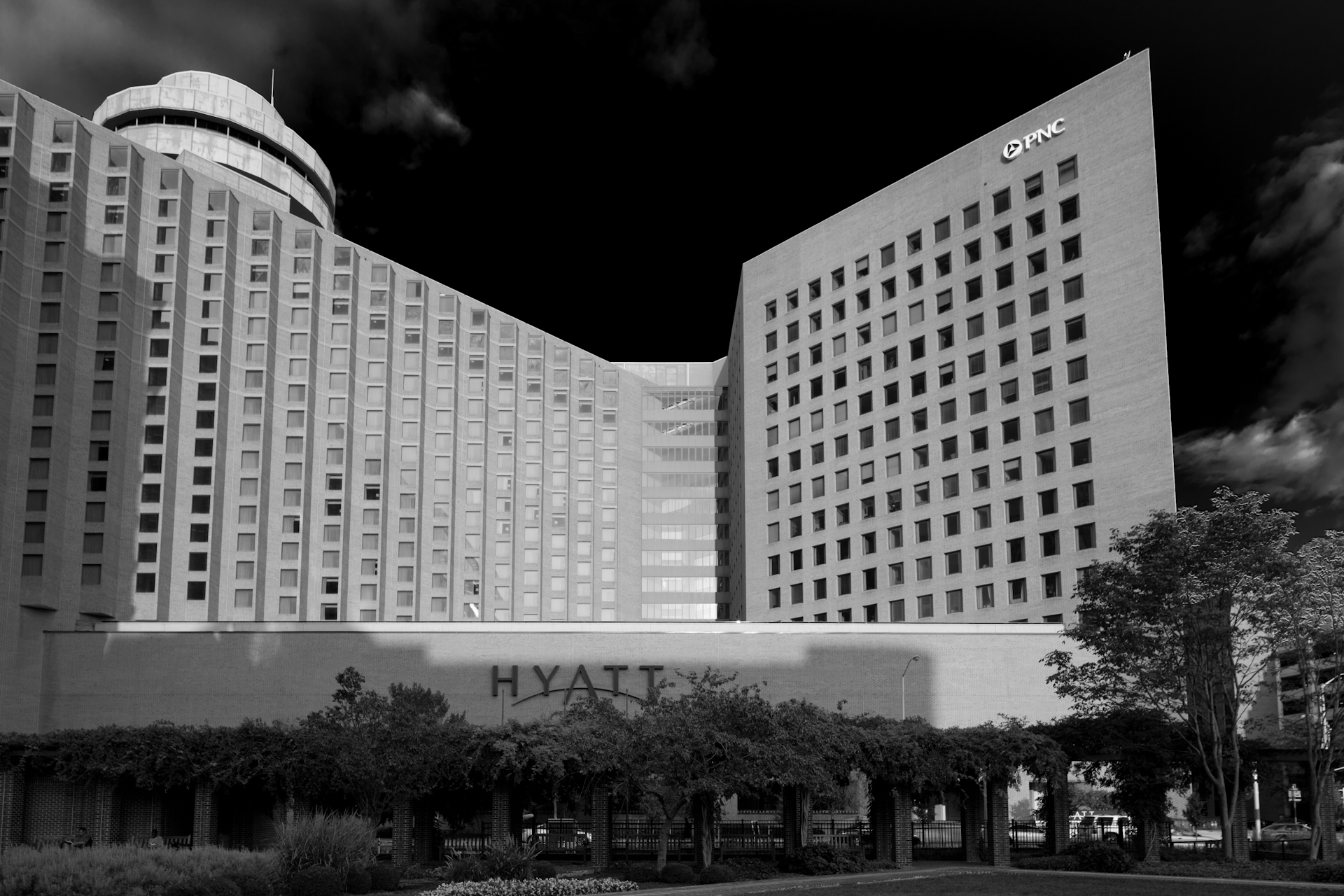
- Former names: Merchants Plaza (1977–1995); National City Center (1995–2010)
- Alternative names: PNC Center

General information
- Type: Hotel, Office
- Location: 1 South Capitol Avenue, Indianapolis, Indiana, United States
- Coordinates: 39°45′59″N 86°9′39″W
- Completed: 1974
- Opening: 1977
- Owner: Hertz Investment Group and Hyatt Regency Hotels

Height
- Roof: 268 ft (82 m)

Technical details
- Floor count: 22

Design and construction
- Architect: Browning Day Pollak Associates

Website
- https://www.hyatt.com/en-US/hotel/indiana/hyatt-regency-indianapolis/indri

The Hyatt Regency Indianapolis is part of PNC Center, a mixed-use high-rise complex in Indianapolis, Indiana, United States. The complex rises 22 floors and 268 feet (82 m) in height, and is currently the 17th-tallest building in the city.

== History ==
The complex was formerly the site of the historic Hotel Lincoln and the D. Sommers & Company Building, both demolished in 1973. Constructed as Merchants Plaza, it was the headquarters of Merchants National Bank and Trust Company, previously located in the Merchants National Bank Building. Construction began in 1974 and was completed in 1977. The buildings were designed by Browning Day Pollak Associates.

Merchants National was acquired by Ohio-based National City Corporation in 1992 and the complex was renamed National City Center in August 1995, serving as the new bank's Indiana regional headquarters. The building was renamed PNC Center in 2010, after National City was acquired by PNC Financial Services.

The complex contains a 499-room Hyatt Regency hotel in one tower and commercial offices in a connected tower; a revolving restaurant, The Eagle's Nest, is located atop the hotel tower. The Hyatt Regency Indianapolis is the tallest mixed-use building in the city, and the second tallest building in the city located south of Washington Street.

According to the Indianapolis Business Journal, the Hyatt Regency Indianapolis has 220 full-time employees and was last renovated in 2018. As of 2020, four dining options were located in the hotel, including the Eagle's Nest, Level One Lounge, Fat Rooster Diner, and Starbucks.

== See also ==
- List of tallest buildings in Indianapolis
- List of tallest buildings in Indiana
