= Signia Hilton Indianapolis =

Hotel in Indianapolis, Indiana

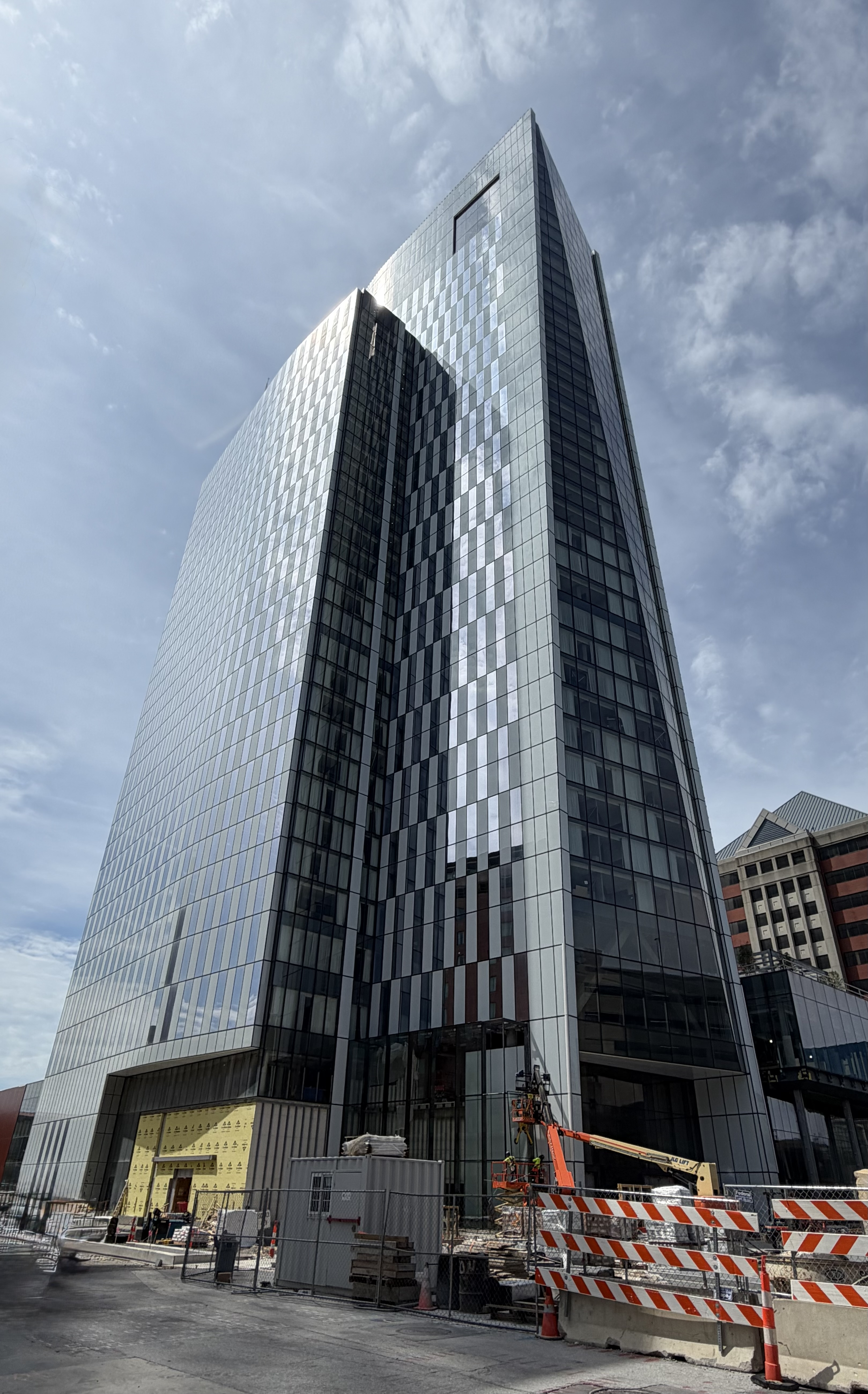
- Signia Hilton Indianapolis nearing completion in 2026

General information
- Status: Under construction
- Type: Hotel
- Location: 101 W. Georgia St. Indianapolis, Indiana, U.S.
- Coordinates: 39°45′50″N 86°9′38″W
- Topped-out: October 9, 2025; 12 months ago
- Cost: US$510 million
- Owner: Capital Improvement Board of Managers of Marion County, Indiana
- Operator: Hilton Hotels & Resorts

Height
- Height: 441 ft (134 m)

Technical details
- Floor count: 38

Design and construction
- Architecture firm: Ratio Architects, Inc.
- Developer: Kite Realty Group Trust

Website
- www.hilton.com/en/hotels/inddisa-signia-indianapolis/

The Signia Hilton Indianapolis is a hotel located in Indianapolis, Indiana. The hotel is set to open in December 2026. Over 440 feet tall, it is the fourth tallest building in Indianapolis and the tallest hotel building in the state of Indiana.

== Design ==
The hotel is 38 stories and 441 ft (134 m) tall with 800 rooms. The hotel will contain a Sky Lounge and a Mezzanine center within the top two floors, alongside a 50,000 ft^{2} (4,600 m^{2}) ballroom, a spa, and meeting space on the third floor. Access to the Indiana Convention Center and Lucas Oil Stadium will be provided via a skywalk from the hotel.

== Timeline ==
Construction of a hotel in the area was first proposed in 2018, with plans for design being led by Indianapolis-based firm Ratio Architects and construction being led by Kite Realty Group Trust. The construction of Signia was part of a larger redevelopment of the Indianapolis Pan Am Plaza and Convention Center, with the construction of the hotel initially expected to cost around $510 million. Among the stated goals of the hotel was the need to reduce overcrowding in existing hotels and to accommodate additional convention traffic in Indianapolis.

In May 2023, funding of the building was assumed by the Indianapolis city government after Kite Realty was unable to gain sufficient funding for the building. A groundbreaking ceremony was held in August 2023. Construction began in June 2024 with the pouring of nearly 1,500,000 US gal (5,700,000 L; 1,200,000 imp gal) of concrete over a 12-hour period as part of the creation of the hotel's foundation, making it the largest concrete pour in Indianapolis history. The pour involved a convoy of around 100 trucks and about 800 truckloads worth of concrete. The building topped out in October 2025. A second hotel at Pan Am Plaza is expected to be constructed following the completion of Signia.

== See also ==
- List of tallest buildings in Indianapolis
