= BMO Plaza =

High-rise office building in Indianapolis, Indiana, US

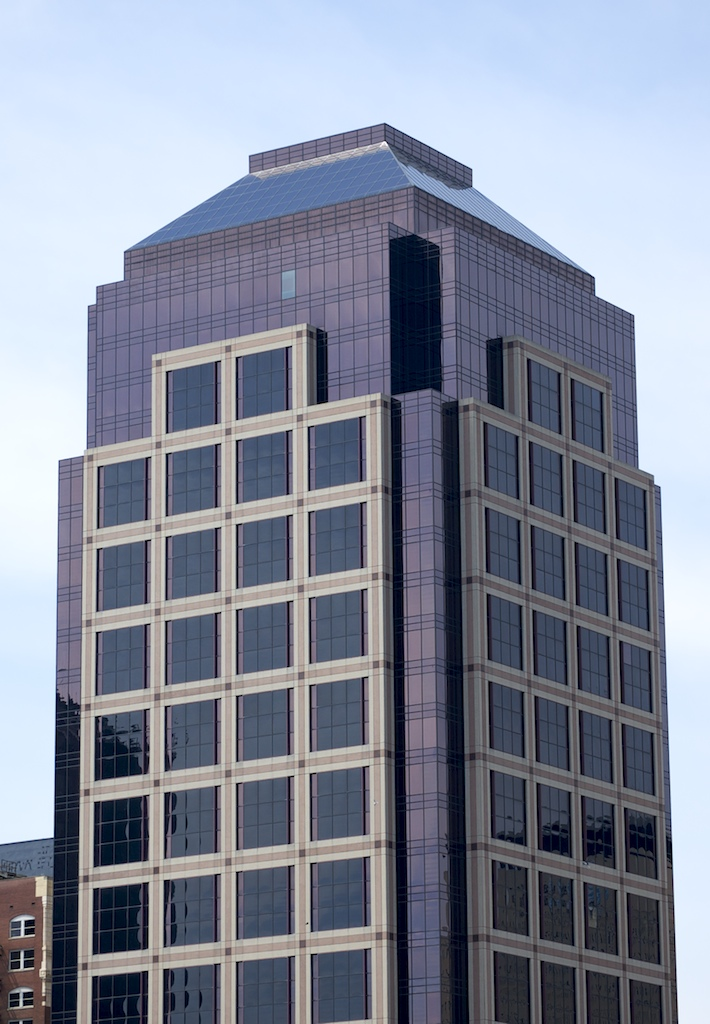
- Interactive map of the BMO Plaza area
- Former names: First Indiana Plaza (1988–2008); M&I Plaza (2008–2011)

General information
- Status: Completed
- Type: Offices
- Location: 135 N. Pennsylvania St., Indianapolis, Indiana, United States
- Coordinates: 39°46′10.15″N 86°09′20.5″W
- Construction started: 1986
- Completed: 1988
- Cost: $60 million

Height
- Roof: 401 ft (122 m)

Technical details
- Structural system: Steel beam with composite concrete and metal deck
- Floor count: 31 (28 above ground, 3 below)
- Floor area: 673,000 square feet (62,500 m^{2})
- Lifts/elevators: 10

Design and construction
- Architecture firm: 3D/International (Houston, Texas)
- Developer: Phillip R. Duke and Associates
- Main contractor: Duke Construction

Other information
- Parking: 390 spaces on levels 2-6 & basement

Website
- bmoplaza.com

BMO Plaza, formerly the M&I Plaza, is a high-rise office building located at 135 North Pennsylvania Street in Indianapolis, Indiana. It was completed in 1988 and is currently the sixth-tallest building in the city, at 401 ft (122 m) with 31 stories. It is primarily used for office space. At 432,300 square feet (40,160 m^{2}), BMO Plaza is ninth-largest office building downtown. It is also the sixth-tallest building in Indiana. Tenants include BMO Harris Bank and General Electric Capital Services.

== History ==
During the late nineteenth century, the building site had been the home of the Denison Hotel. The building was developed as First Indiana Plaza by Indianapolis-based Phillip R. Duke and Associates and construction was started in mid 1986 following the demolition of the seven-story Denison Parking garage on the site. When the building opened in April 1988, it served as the headquarters of the First Indiana Federal Savings Bank, the building's major tenant. In September 2008, the building was renamed M&I Plaza following the acquisition of First Indiana by Marshall & Ilsley Corporation earlier that year. Three years later, the building changed name a second time to BMO Plaza. In 2018, it was sold to a new owner for $70 million.

== See also ==
- List of tallest buildings in Indianapolis
- List of tallest buildings in Indiana
