= List of tallest buildings in Indianapolis =

Skyline of Indianapolis
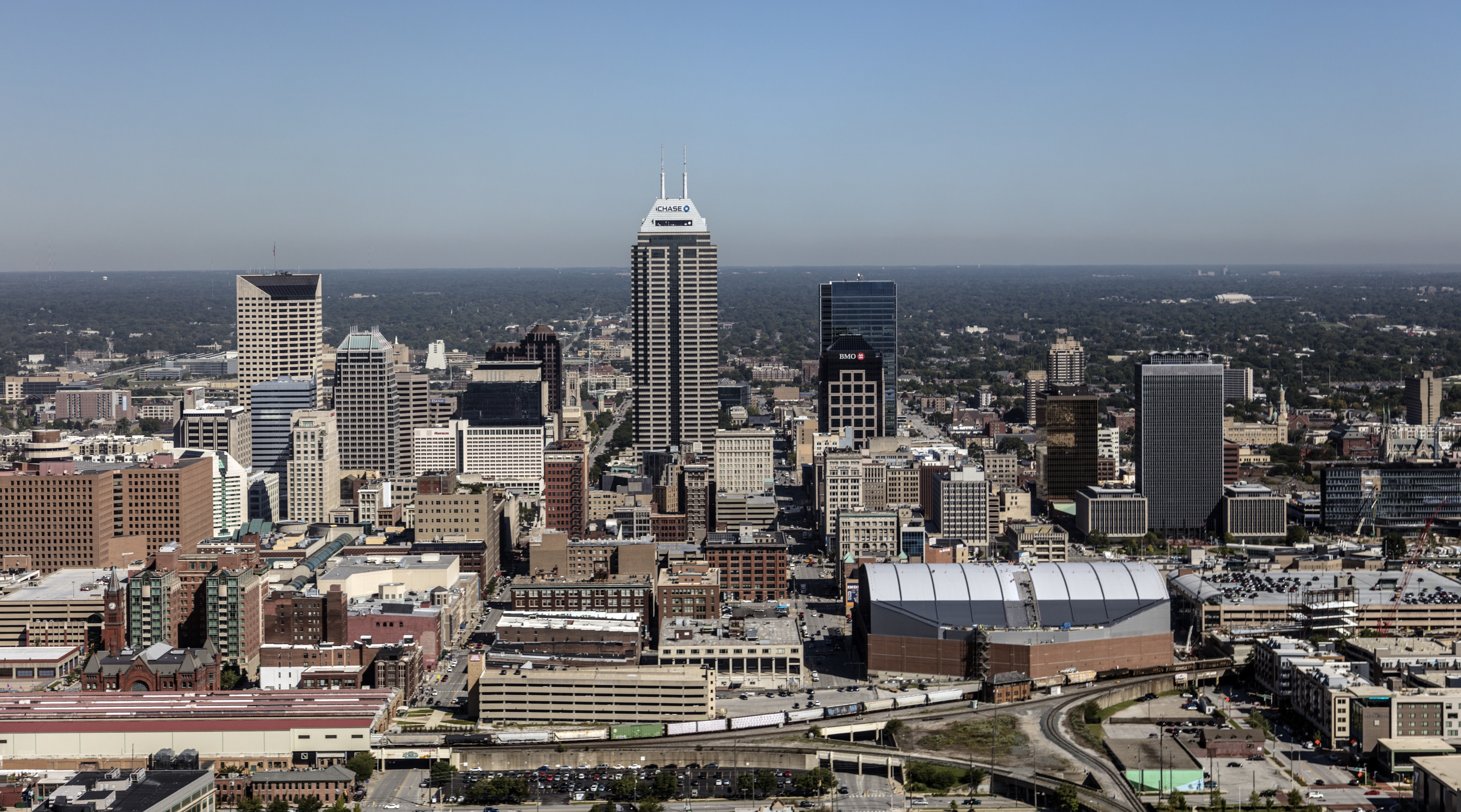
- Downtown Indianapolis looking north, 2016
- Tallest building: Salesforce Tower (1990)
- Tallest building height: 811 ft (247.2 m)
- First 150 m+ building: Regions Tower (1970)

Number of tall buildings (2026)
- Taller than 100 m (328 ft): 9
- Taller than 150 m (492 ft): 3
- Taller than 200 m (656 ft): 1

Number of tall buildings — feet
- Taller than 200 ft (61.0 m): 39
- Taller than 300 ft (91.4 m): 12

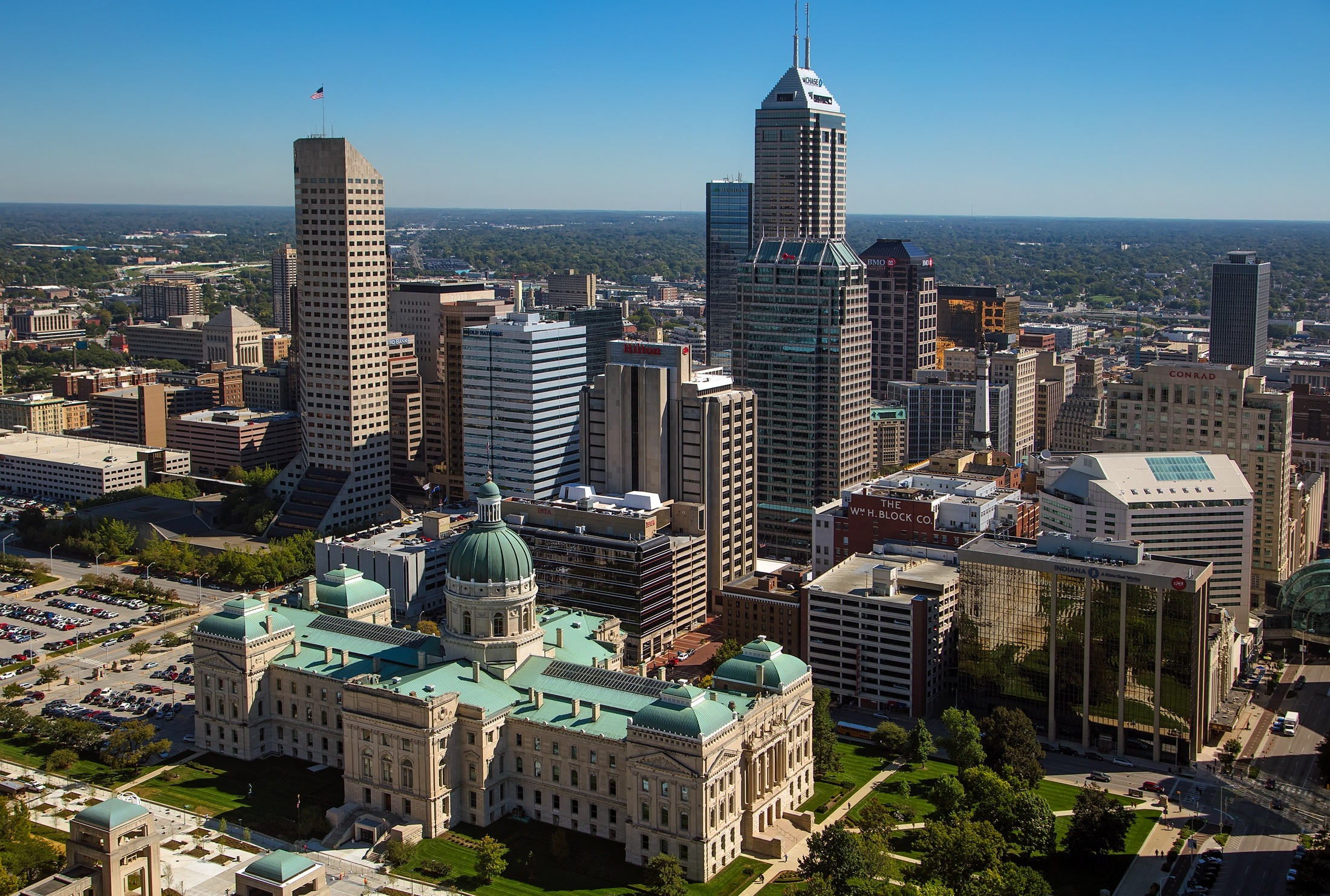
Indianapolis skyline and the Indiana Statehouse in 2016

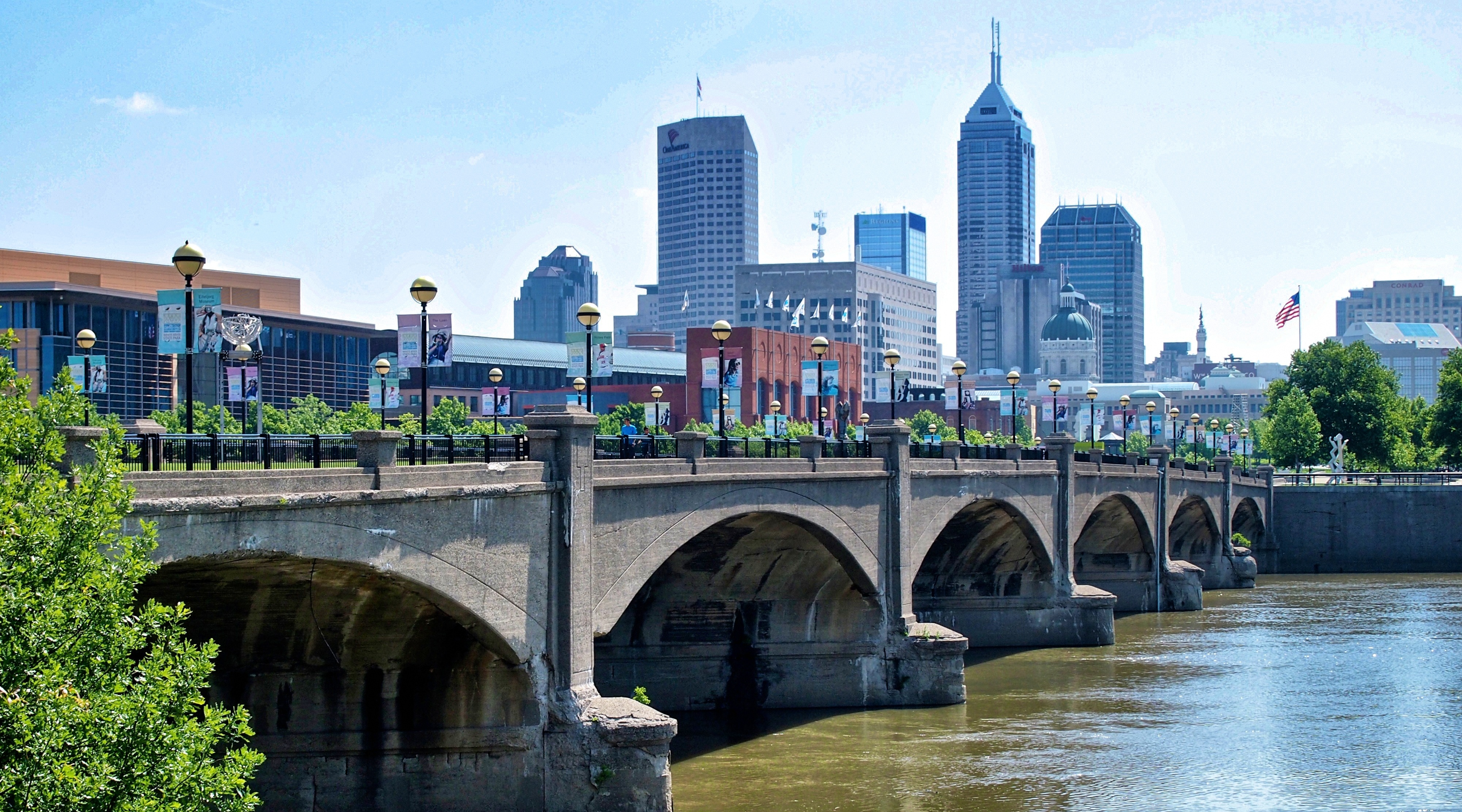
Downtown Indianapolis behind the Old Washington Street Bridge in White River State Park

Indianapolis is the capital and largest city of the U.S. state of Indiana, with a metropolitan area of 2.1 million residents. As of 2026, the city has 36 buildings taller than 200 feet (61 m), 13 of which have a height greater than 300 feet (91 m). Indianapolis has the largest skyline in Indiana, and most of the state's tallest buildings, including its only three skyscrapers taller than 492 ft (150 m). The tallest building in Indianapolis is the 49-story Salesforce Tower, which rises 811 ft (247 m) and was completed in 1990. The city's second tallest building is the OneAmerica Tower, which was previously the tallest building from 1982 until 1990.

The history of skyscrapers in Indianapolis began with the completion in 1895 of the Thomas Building, regarded as the first high-rise in the city. Before its demolition, this 13-story structure stood at a height of 170 feet (52 m). Indianapolis went through an early high-rise construction boom in the 1960s, during which time the city saw the completion of the 372 ft (113 m) City-County Building. The City-County Building was the first building in the city to rise higher than the Soldiers' and Sailors' Monument, and was the tallest building in the city until 1970. However, the pace of new high-rise construction then slowed until 1982. In the mid-1980s, Indianapolis entered into a large building boom that lasted until 1990. During this period, five of the city's six tallest skyscrapers were built, including Salesforce Tower (then known as the Bank One Tower), OneAmerica Tower, and the postmodernist 300 North Meridian, Market Tower, and BMO Plaza buildings, significantly reshaping the downtown skyline.

Very little high-rise development took place from 1990 until the mid-2000s. Since then, several notable buildings have been added to the skyline. The 376-ft (115 m) JW Marriott Indianapolis, completed in 2011, is the tallest hotel in the city, while 360 Market Square, at 290 ft (88.5 m) is the city's third tallest residential building. One Indiana Square, now known as Regions Tower, went through an exterior refinishing after being damaged by high winds in 2006. Other projects built after 2000 include the 287 ft (87 m) Conrad Indianapolis and 260 ft (79 m) Simon Property Group Headquarters, both in 2006. The 38-story, 441 ft (134 m) Signia by Hilton Indianapolis, currently under construction, is the tallest new building in Indianapolis in over 35 years. The building will be the city's tallest hotel and fourth-tallest building upon its expected completion in 2026.

Most of Indianapolis' high-rises are located in Downtown Indianapolis, with many of the tallest buildings situated within the Mile Square, in the center of downtown. Within the skyscrapers is Monument Circle, a circular street centered on the Soldiers & Sailors Monument. The downtown skyline is surrounded by the White River to the west, Interstate 65 to the north, and Interstate 70 to the east and south. A skywalk and tunnel system connects multiple high-rises downtown. Near the city's northern edge is the Keystone at the Crossing district, which has a small number of high-rises, the tallest being the 18-story 8888 Keystone Crossing.

== History ==
Number of buildings by height in Indianapolis by the end of each year, based on the information in this article. Click on the legend to toggle a specific height on or off. View chart definition.

== Cityscape ==
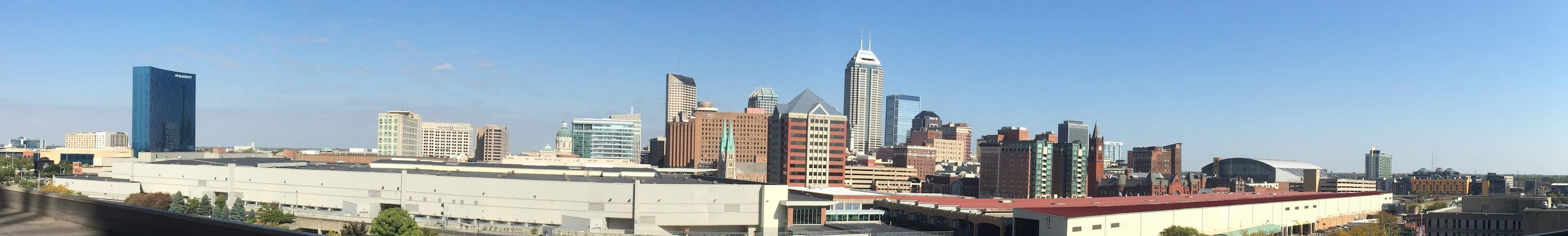
Panorama of Downtown Indianapolis from Lucas Oil Stadium in 2019

== Map of tallest buildings ==
The map below show the location of buildings taller than 200 ft (61 m) in Downtown Indianapolis, where the majority of such buildings in the city are. Each marker is numbered by the building's height rank, and colored by the decade of its completion. Two buildings taller than 200 ft (61 m) are located outside of the map: CityView on Meridian and 8888 Keystone Crossing.

Buildings taller than 200 ft (61 m) in Downtown Indianapolis. An asterisk (*) next to the building's name indicates it is located outside the map.
- 1950s and before
- 1960s
- 1970s
- 1980s
- 1990s
- 2000s
- 2010s
1 Salesforce Tower
2 OneAmerica Tower
3 Regions Tower
4 Market Tower
5 300 North Meridian
6 BMO Plaza
7 JW Marriott Indianapolis
8 City-County Building
9 101 West Ohio
10 AT&T Building
11 Capital Center South Tower
12 Hilton Indianapolis
13 Riley Towers I
14 Riley Towers II
15 360 Market Square
16 Conrad Indianapolis
17 220 Meridian
18 Market Square Center
19 Sidney & Lois Eskenazi Hospital
20 CityView on Meridian*
21 Hyatt Regency Indianapolis / PNC Center
22 Simon Property Group Headquarters
23 Indiana Statehouse
24 Fifth Third Bank Tower
25 Barnes and Thornburg Building
26 8888 Keystone Crossing*
27 Fletcher Trust Building
28 Sheraton Indianapolis City Centre
29 Indiana Government Center North
30 Pan Am Tower
31 Indianapolis Marriott Downtown
32 Claypool Court
33 One North Pennsylvania
34 Riley Hospital for Children Simon Family Tower
35 30 South Meridian
36 Richard G. Lugar Tower
37 The Westin Indianapolis
38 Hyatt House / Hyatt Place Indianapolis
39 110 East Washington Street

== Tallest buildings ==
This list ranks completed buildings in Indianapolis that stand at least 200 feet (61 m) tall based on standard height measurements. This includes spires and architectural details but does not include antenna masts. The "Year" column indicates the year in which a building was completed. Buildings tied in height are sorted by year of completion with earlier buildings ranked first, and then alphabetically.

Was the tallest building in Indiana upon completion

Rank	Name	Image	Location	Height ft (m)	Floors	Year	Purpose	Notes
1	Salesforce Tower		39°46′11″N 86°09′26″W	811 (247.2)	49	1990	Office	Tallest building in Indianapolis and in Indiana since 1990. Roof height is 701 feet (214 m). Former names include Bank One Tower and Chase Tower. Originally conceived as American Fletcher Tower. Tallest building completed in Indianapolis in the 1990s. Only building to be taller than 656 ft (200 m) in Indianapolis.
2	OneAmerica Tower		39°46′14″N 86°09′37″W	533 (162.5)	38	1982	Office	Topped out on July 30, 1982, becoming the tallest building in Indianapolis and in Indiana until Salesforce Tower was completed in 1990. Former names include AUL Tower and One American Square. The building is unique for its hexagonal floorplate, interior courtyard, and Indiana limestone cladding. Tallest building completed in Indianapolis in the 1980s.
3	Regions Tower		39°46′13″N 86°09′20″W	504 (153.6)	37	1970	Office	Topped out on November 9, 1968 and dedicated in December 1970. Tallest building in Indianapolis and in Indiana until OneAmerica Tower was completed in 1982. It opened as the Indiana National Bank (INB) Tower/One Indiana Square. The glass curtain wall façade was renovated in 1982 and 1992. After severe weather damaged the building in 2006, it was reclad in 2007–2009 with a modern façade. Tallest building completed in Indianapolis in the 1970s.
4	Market Tower		39°46′08″N 86°09′34″W	421 (128.2)	32	1988	Office	The building was topped out on April 9, 1988, and dedicated on October 18, 1988.
5	300 North Meridian		39°46′18″N 86°09′30″W	408 (124.4)	28	1989	Office	
6	BMO Plaza		39°46′10″N 86°09′21″W	401 (122.2)	31	1988	Office	The building was topped out on June 16, 1987, and opened as First Indiana Plaza and was later named M&I Plaza.
7	JW Marriott Indianapolis		39°46′00″N 86°10′04″W	376 (114.7)	34	2011	Hotel	The building was topped out on December 1, 2009 and opened on February 4, 2011. The tallest hotel in Indiana, it is connected to the Indianapolis skywalk system. Tallest building completed in Indianapolis in the 2010s.
8	City-County Building		39°46′05″N 86°09′13″W	372 (113.5)	28	1962	Government	Tallest building completed in Indianapolis during the 1960s. It contains a public indoor observation deck on the 28th floor. Tallest government building in Indianapolis.
9	101 West Ohio		39°46′11″N 86°09′37″W	360 (109.8)	22	1987	Office	The building is topped with a 65-foot (20 m) xenon light pylon at its northeast corner.
10	AT&T Building		39°46′15″N 86°09′31″W	321 (97.8)	22	1932	Office	When completed in the 1930s, the building was only seven floors high; additions in the 1940s and 1960s brought it to its current height.
11	Capital Center South Tower		39°46′13″N 86°09′34″W	311 (94.8)	22	1987	Office	Connected via atrium to Fifth Third Bank Tower.
12	Hilton Indianapolis		39°46′08″N 86°09′38″W	302 (92.1)	18	1971	Hotel	Originally constructed as the headquarters of Blue Cross and Blue Shield of Indiana (now Anthem).
13	Riley Towers I		39°46′31″N 86°09′10″W	295 (89.9)	30	1963	Residential	Riley Towers I and II are the tallest residential buildings in Indianapolis and Indiana.
14	Riley Towers II		39°46′33″N 86°09′09″W	295 (89.9)	30	1963	Residential	Riley Towers I and II are the tallest residential buildings in Indianapolis and Indiana.
15	360 Market Square		39°46′07″N 86°09′05″W	290 (88.5)	28	2017	Residential	Third-tallest residential building in Indianapolis, and tallest built after 1970.
16	Conrad Indianapolis		39°46′03″N 86°09′35″W	287 (87.5)	23	2006	Mixed-use	Tallest building completed in Indianapolis during the 2000s. It is connected to the Indianapolis skywalk system. Mixed-use hotel and residential building.
17	220 Meridian		39°46′13″N 86°09′31″W	284 (86.6)	23	1974	Mixed-use	Formerly known as the SBC 220 Building and AT&T 220 Building. Mixed-use office and residential building.
18	Market Square Center		39°46′10″N 86°09′14″W	283 (86.3)	20	1975	Office	Also known as the Gold Building. In June 2022, developers announced it would be converted into a 350-unit apartment building.
19	Sidney & Lois Eskenazi Hospital		39°46′40″N 86°11′02″W	280 (85.3)	11	2013	Hospital	Replaced the Wishard Memorial Hospital.
20	CityView on Meridian		39°49′31″N 86°09′22″W	268 (81.7)	20	1966	Residential	Also known as The Summit. Tallest building in Indianapolis outside of downtown.
21	Hyatt Regency Indianapolis / PNC Center		39°45′59″N 86°09′39″W	268 (81.7)	22	1977	Mixed-use	Connected to the Indianapolis skywalk system. Mixed-use hotel and office building.
22	Simon Property Group Headquarters		39°46′01″N 86°09′44″W	260 (79.1)	14	2006	Office	
23	Indiana Statehouse		39°46′07″N 86°09′46″W	255 (77.7)	4	1888	Government	17th-tallest state capitol building in the United States. Second-tallest building in Indianapolis at the time of completion.
24	Fifth Third Bank Tower		39°46′15″N 86°09′33″W	246 (75)	17	1983	Office	Connected via atrium to the 12th-tallest building in Indianapolis, Capital Center South Tower.
25	Barnes and Thornburg Building		39°46′00″N 86°09′28″W	245 (74.7)	17	1909	Office	Originally known as the Merchants Bank Building.
26	8888 Keystone Crossing		39°55′01″N 86°06′32″W	229 (69.8)	18	1988	Office	Tallest building in the Keystone at the Crossing district; second tallest building in Indianapolis outside of downtown.
27	Fletcher Trust Building		39°46′07″N 86°09′24″W	218 (66.4)	16	1915	Hotel	In 2026, the building was a 188-room Hilton Garden Inn hotel.
28	Sheraton Indianapolis City Centre		39°46′11″N 86°09′31″W	217 (66.1)	21	1969	Hotel	In 2026, the building was a 378-room Sheraton hotel.
29	Indiana Government Center North		39°46′09″N 86°09′53″W	214 (65.2)	14	1960	Government	
30	Pan Am Tower		39°45′50″N 86°09′41″W	214 (65.2)	12	1987	Office	Also known as Centricity and Pan American Plaza.
31	Indianapolis Marriott Downtown		39°45′59″N 86°09′52″W	214 (65.2)	19	2001	Hotel	Connected to the Indianapolis skywalk system.
32	Claypool Court		39°46′03″N 86°09′37″W	213 (65) (Note: Sources do not state the exact height of this building. This figure was determined using Google Earth by subtracting the altitude of the building's lowest main pedestrian open-air entrance from its highest architectural point.)	18	1985	Mixed-use	Connected to the Indianapolis skywalk system. In 2026, tenants included a 360-room Embassy Suites by Hilton hotel, Burlington, Panera Bread, and Weber Grill Restaurant, among others.
33	One North Pennsylvania		39°46′02″N 86°09′22″W	212 (64.6)	16	1908	Office	
34	Riley Hospital for Children Simon Family Tower		39°46′40″N 86°10′49″W	210 (64)	10	2010	Hospital	
35	30 South Meridian		39°45′58″N 86°09′31″W	206 (62.8)	12	1929	Office	
36	Richard G. Lugar Tower		39°46′45″N 86°08′59″W	201 (61)	15	1974	Residential	
37	The Westin Indianapolis		39°45′59″N 86°09′49″W	201 (61)	15	1987	Hotel	Connected to the Indianapolis skywalk system.
38	Hyatt House / Hyatt Place Indianapolis		39°45′53″N 86°09′24″W	201 (61)	15	2019	Hotel	Originally proposed as dual Aloft and Element hotel brands, but changed to Hyatt Place and Hyatt House brands before construction.
39	110 East Washington Street		39°46′02″N 86°09′21″W	200 (61)	15	1921	Residential	

=== Other structures ===
This list ranks completed structures in Indianapolis that stand at least 200 feet (61 m) tall based on standard height measurements. The "Year" column indicates the year in which a structure was completed.

Rank	Name	Image	Coordinates	Height ft (m)	Floors	Year	Purpose	Notes
1	Harding Street Station smokestacks	–	39°42′34″N 86°11′44″W	565 (172)	N/A	1973	Chimneys	
2	Indianapolis International Airport Air Traffic Control Tower		39°42′31″N 86°18′16″W	340 (104)	6	2006	Air traffic control	Upon completion, it was the second-tallest air traffic control tower in the U.S. and among the ten tallest in the world. It is the tallest habitable building outside downtown Indianapolis.
3	Indiana State Soldiers' and Sailors' Monument		39°46′07″N 86°09′29″W	284.6 (87)	3	1902	Monument	Tallest structure in Indianapolis until the completion of the City-County Building in 1962. Tallest structure in Indianapolis listed on the National Register of Historic Places.
4	Lucas Oil Stadium		39°45′36″N 86°09′50″W	270 (82)	7	2008	Stadium	
5	Scottish Rite Cathedral		39°46′34″N 86°09′29″W	212 (65)	4	1929	Carillon	
6	Indiana War Memorial		39°46′24″N 86°09′25″W	210 (64)	3	1933	Monument	
7	Old National Centre		39°46′27″N 86°09′03″W	208 (63)	4	1909	Minaret	

== Tallest under construction or proposed ==
=== Under construction ===
The following table includes buildings under construction in Indianapolis that are planned to be at least 200 ft (61 m) tall as of 2026, based on standard height measurement. The "Year" column indicates the expected year of completion. A dash "–" indicates information about the building's exact height, floor count, or year of completion is unknown or has not been released.

Name	Image	Height ft (m)	Floors	Year	Notes
Signia Hilton Indianapolis		441 (134)	38	2026	Demolition of the previous Pan Am Plaza began in January 2024. New construction began in April 2024. Topped out in late 2025. The mat foundation beneath the tower was the largest single continuous concrete pour in Indiana history. Overnight from May 31 through June 1, 2024, approximately 7,344 cubic yards (5,615 m^{3}) of concrete were carried to the site in 773 loads by 164 trucks. Hilton brand standards call for not having a 13th floor, so while it will be referred to as "38 stories", the highest occupiable floor will actually be the 37th floor plate.
Indiana University Health Medical Center		350 (107)	16	2027	The new hospital will consolidate operations of IU Health University and IU Health Methodist hospitals. Topped out in May 2025.
Purdue Academic Success Building		248 (76)	15	2027	Broke ground in 2025.
Ritz-Carlton Indianapolis	–	–	15	2028	Broke ground in 2026.

== Tallest demolished ==
There has been one building taller than 200 ft (61 m) in Indianapolis which no longer stands today.

Name	Image	Height ft (m)	Floors	Year completed	Year demolished	Notes
Marion County Courthouse		280 (85)	4	1876	1962	Was the tallest building in Indianapolis when it was standing. Courthouse for Marion County, of which Indianapolis is the county seat.

== Timeline of tallest buildings ==
This lists buildings that once held the title of tallest building in Indianapolis. The Indiana State Soldiers' and Sailors' Monument is often billed as the tallest building in Indianapolis from its completion in 1902 until the completion of the City-County Building, but because it is classified as an uninhabitable building, it is omitted from this list.

Name	Image	Street address	Years as tallest	Height ft (m)	Floors	Reference
Marion County Courthouse (Note: This building was demolished in 1962 following the completion of the City-County Building.)		200 E. Washington St.	1876–1962 (86 years)	280 (85)	4	
City-County Building		200 E. Washington St.	1962–1970 (8 years)	372 (113)	28	
Indiana National Bank Tower (Note: This building was constructed as One Indiana Square but has since been renamed Regions Tower.)		211 N. Pennsylvania St.	1970–1982 (12 years)	504 (154)	36	
AUL Tower (Note: This building was constructed as the AUL Building but has since been renamed OneAmerica Tower.)		1 American Sq.	1982–1990 (8 years)	533 (162)	38	
Bank One Tower (Note: This building was constructed as the Bank One Tower but has since been renamed Salesforce Tower.)		111 Monument Cir.	1990–present (36 years)	811 (247)	49	

== See also ==
- Indiana Tower
- List of tallest buildings in Indiana
- List of tallest buildings in Evansville
- List of tallest buildings in Fort Wayne
- List of tallest buildings in South Bend
- List of tallest air traffic control towers in the United States
