= Capital Center South Tower =

High-rise office building in Indianapolis, Indiana, US

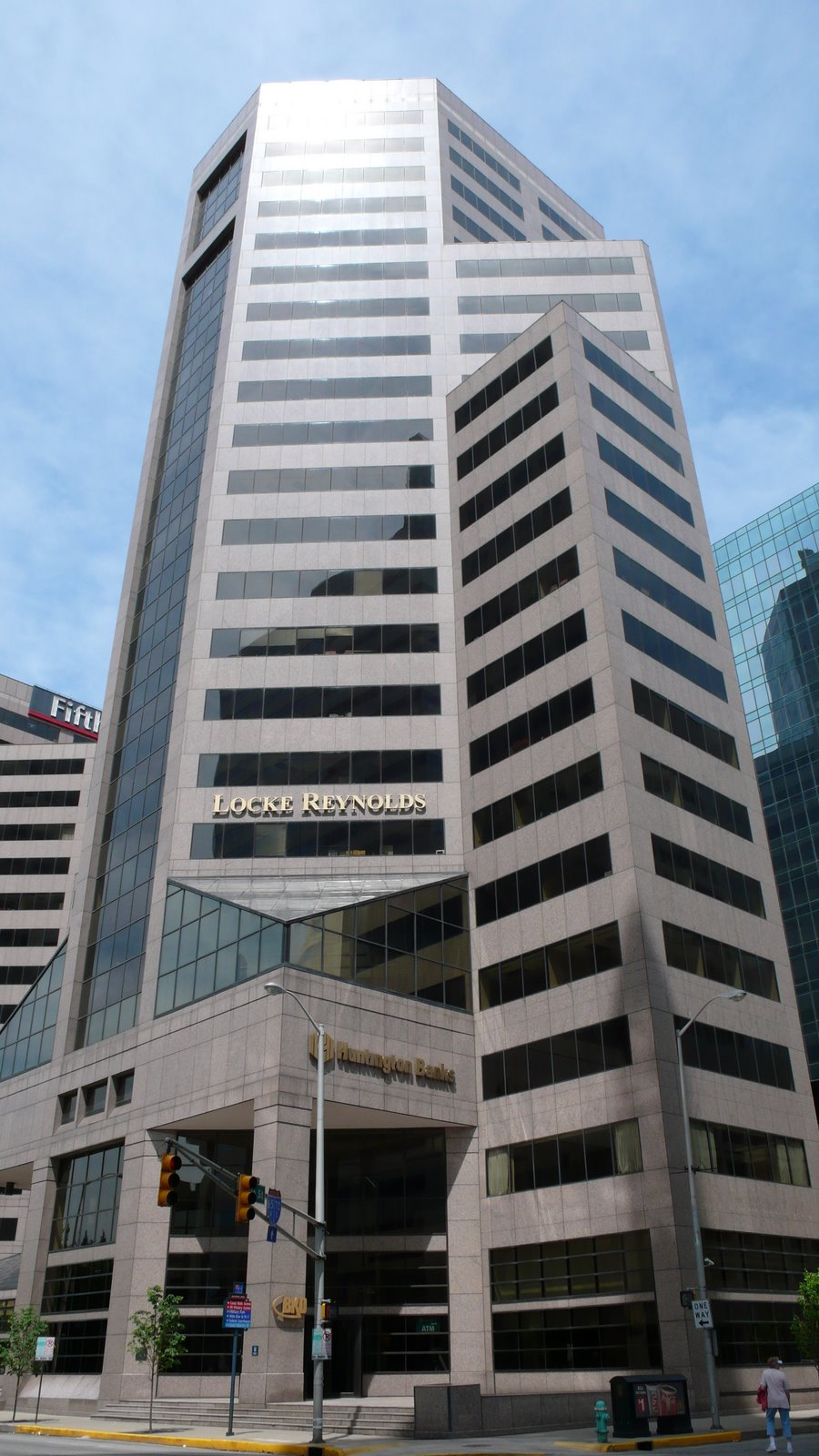

General information
- Type: Offices
- Location: 201 North Illinois Street; Indianapolis, Indiana
- Coordinates: 39°46′13″N 86°9′34″W
- Completed: 1987

Height
- Roof: 311 ft (95 m)

Technical details
- Floor count: 22
- Lifts/elevators: 6

Design and construction
- Architect(s): Browning Day Mullins Dierdorf
- Developer: R.V. Welch Investments
- Main contractor: Browning Construction, Inc.

Capital Center South Tower is a high-rise office building located at 201 North Illinois Street in Indianapolis, Indiana. It was completed in 1987 and is 22 stories tall.

== See also ==
- List of tallest buildings in Indianapolis
- List of tallest buildings in Indiana
