= 110 East Washington Street =

High-rise residential building in Indianapolis, Indiana, U.S.

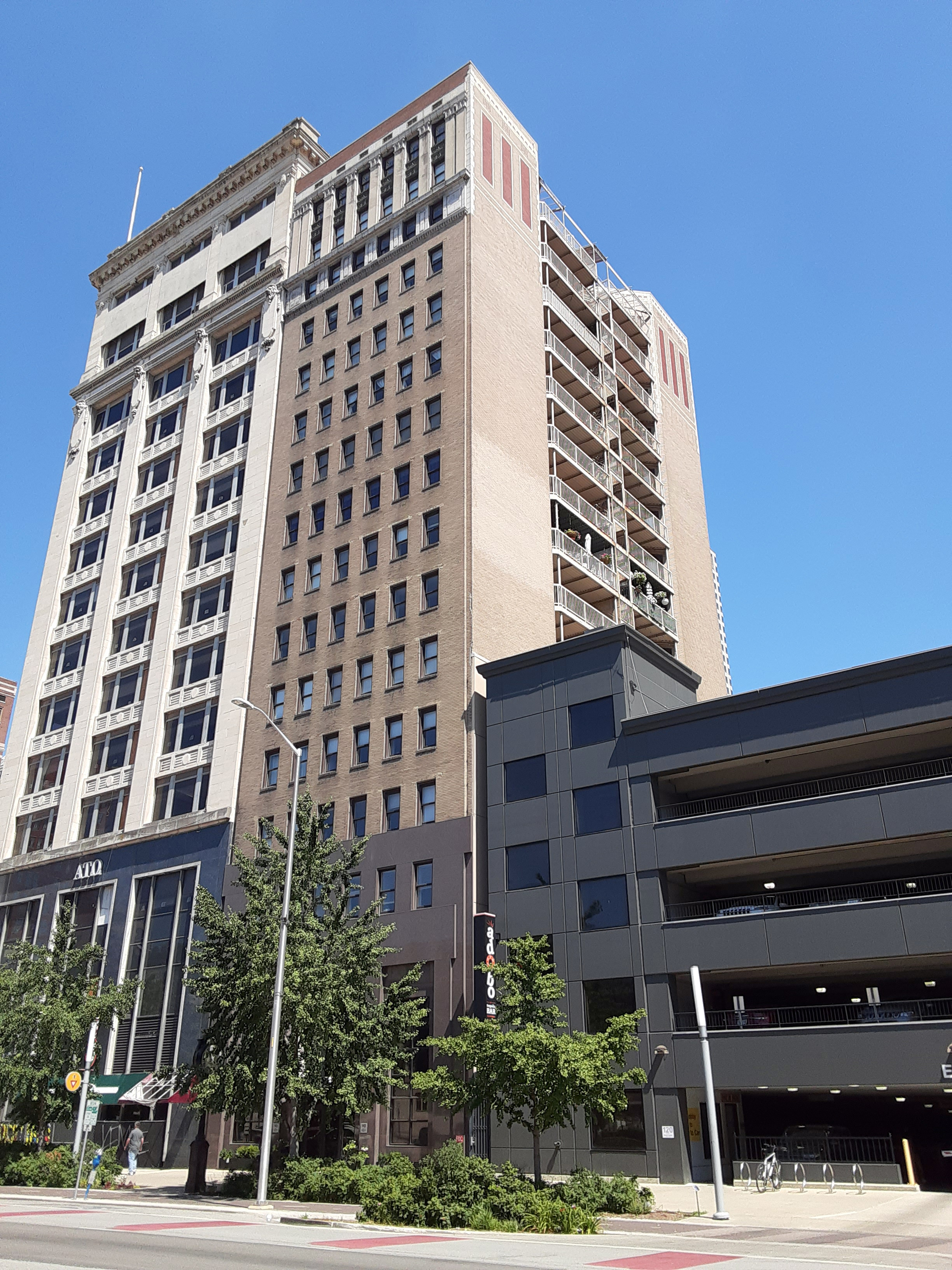
- Former names: City Trust Building; Morris Plan Building; National City Bank of Indianapolis Building

General information
- Type: Residential
- Location: 110 East Washington Street; Indianapolis, Indiana
- Coordinates: 39.7673°N 86.15575°W
- Completed: 1921
- Renovated: 2001–2002

Height
- Roof: 200 ft (61 m)

Technical details
- Floor count: 16

110 East Washington Street is a high rise in Indianapolis, Indiana. The building, which is now the "110 Condos", was originally built in 1921–1922 as the main office for National City Bank. This bank (which was not related to the National City Bank of Cleveland, Ohio) closed during the Roosevelt Bank Holiday of 1933, was found to be insolvent, and did not reopen. The building later became the home of The Morris Plan Savings and Loan, which had a much smaller office on North Delaware Street.

The same fate, however, befell the Morris Plan years later in the late 1980s, when it, too, was found to have irregularities by the federal regulators and was forced into a purchase by Summit Bank of Fort Wayne, only to be purchased by INB (Indiana National Bank), which was soon thereafter itself purchased by the National Bank of Detroit (NBD).

The offices of the bank were closed, but the banking floor (now the Adobo Grill space) stayed open until being merged with NBD's branch at Jefferson Plaza. Soon after the building closed in 1994, the contents were auctioned and it sat vacant until 2001 when The Indianapolis Star reported that the building was being converted into condos. The reasons for the long vacancy were the lack of financial interest in condos and vacant office space downtown in the 1990s, combined with a complex ownership situation in which the bank owned part of the land and several heirs to an earlier property owner owned the rest. It took lengthy negotiation to get the land ownership resolved.

Construction of condos in the vacant space started in 2001, and the first owners occupied the newly renovated building in 2002. At present the building is fully occupied with a mix of mostly owners with some renters. Adobo Grill, an upscale Mexican restaurant and tequila bar occupies the first and second floors.

== See also ==
- List of tallest buildings in Indianapolis
