= One North Pennsylvania =

High-rise building in Indianapolis, Indiana, U.S.

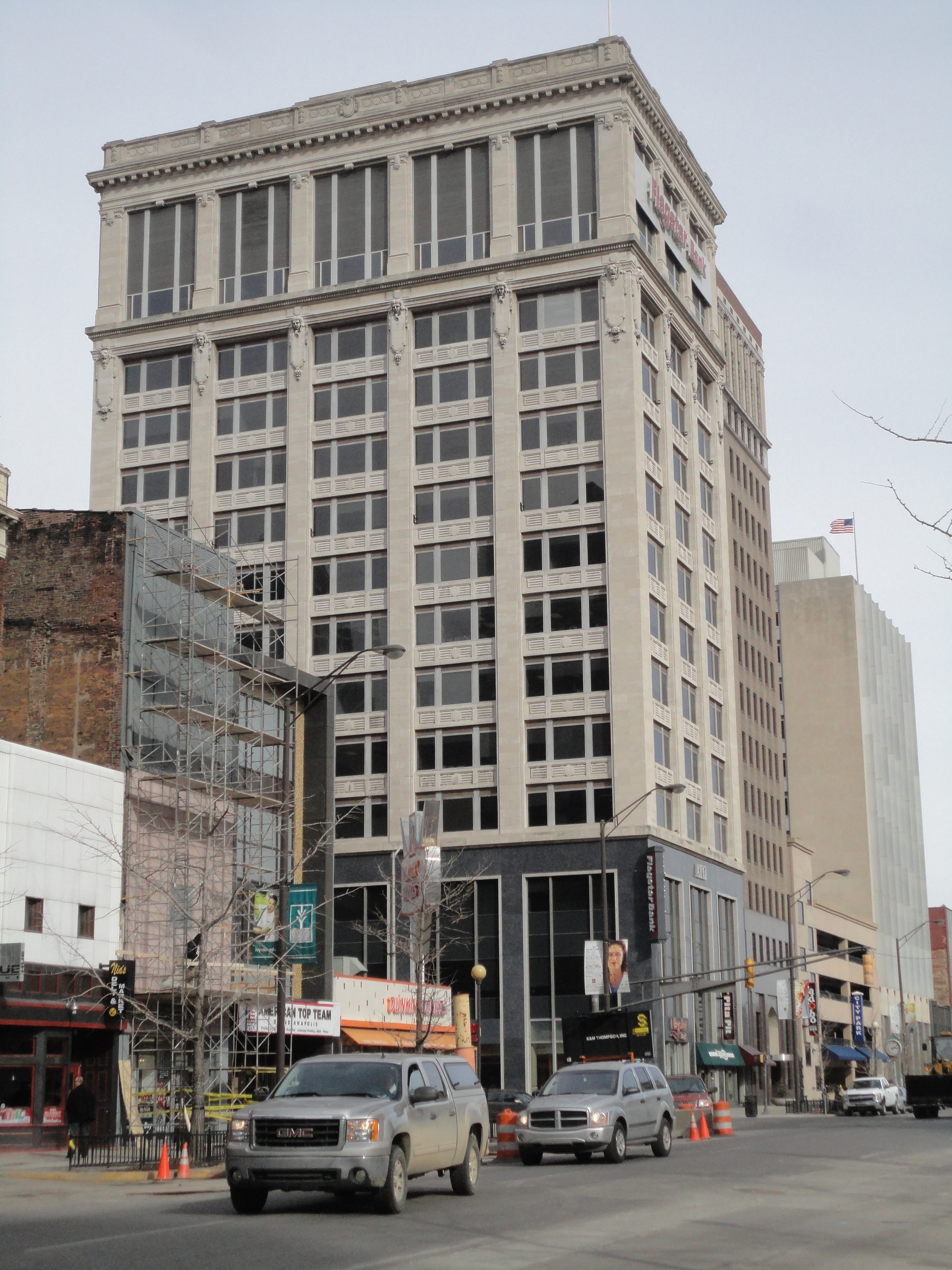
- One North Pennsylvania in 2011.
- Interactive map of the One North Pennsylvania area
- Former names: Odd Fellows Building

General information
- Status: Completed
- Type: Offices
- Location: 1 North Pennsylvania Street; Indianapolis, Indiana 46204; United States
- Coordinates: 39°46′2″N 86°9′21″W
- Opened: 1908
- Owner: Loftus Robinson LLC

Height
- Height: 212 ft (65 m)

Technical details
- Floor count: 16
- Floor area: 82,565 sq ft (7,670.5 m^{2})

Design and construction
- Architecture firm: Rubush & Hunter

One North Pennsylvania, formerly known as the Odd Fellows Building, is a neo-classical high-rise building in Indianapolis, Indiana. It was completed in 1908 and has 16 floors. It is primarily used for office space.

Indianapolis-based Loftus Robinson LLC closed on the building on March 24, 2017, from Hollywood, Florida-based Naya USA Investment & Management LLC. Loftus Robinson plans to renovate the building's exterior and interior with the help of federal historic tax credits. The building is slated to become a Kimpton Hotel.

== See also ==
- List of tallest buildings in Indianapolis
