= Indiana Government Center North =

High-rise government building in Indianapolis, Indiana, US

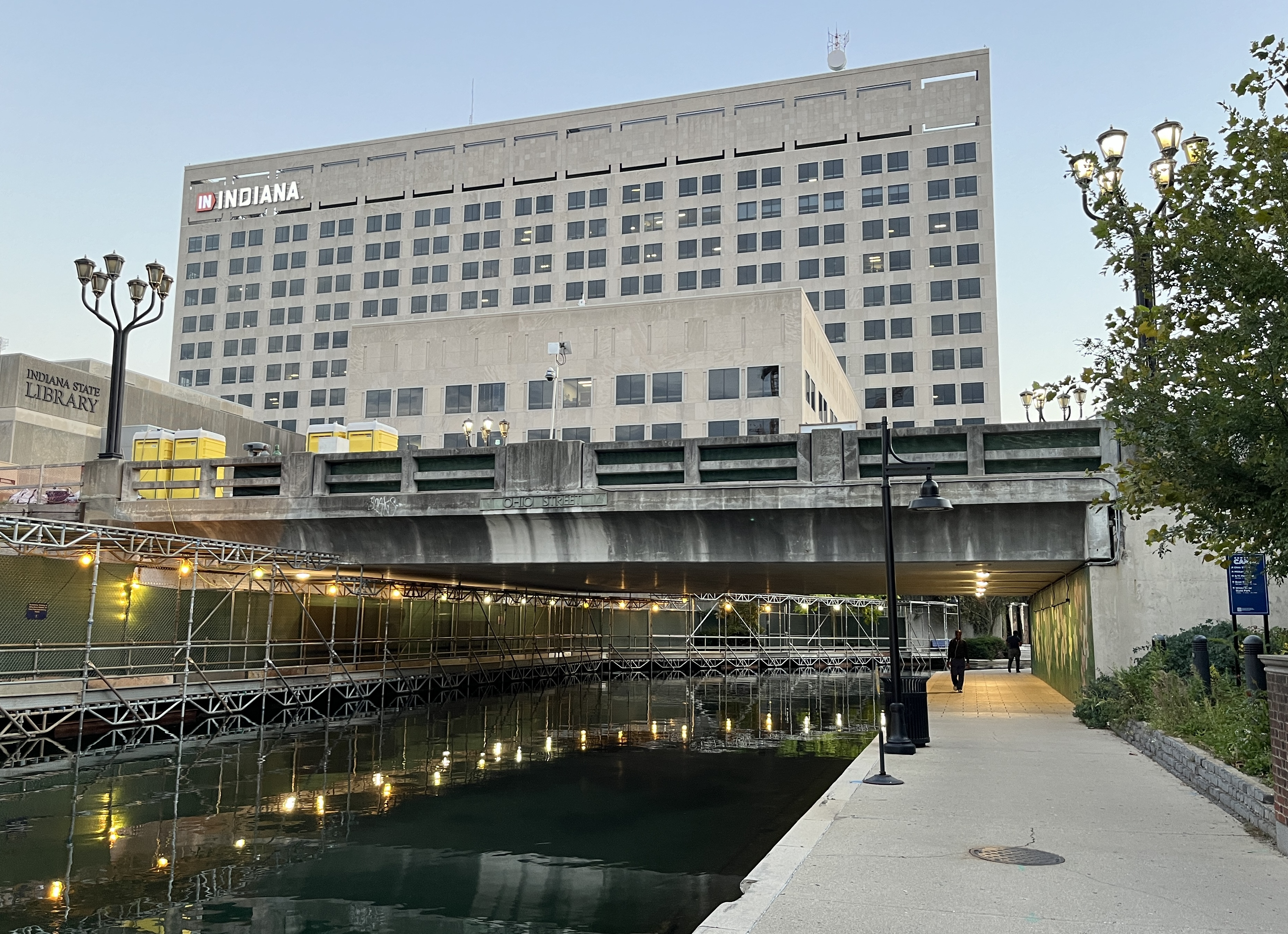
- Indiana Government Center North from the Canal Walk in 2024
- Interactive map of the Indiana Government Center North area

General information
- Type: Office
- Location: 100 North Senate Avenue, Indianapolis, Indiana, United States
- Coordinates: 39.769053°N 86.165289°W
- Completed: 1960

Height
- Roof: 214 ft (65 m)

Technical details
- Floor count: 14

Indiana Government Center North is a high rise in Indianapolis, Indiana. It was completed in 1960 and has 14 floors. It is primarily used for office spaces for the government of Indiana. Extensive remodeling and renovation of the building made in conjunction with the construction of the adjacent Indiana Government Center South building was completed in 1993.

== See also ==
- List of tallest buildings in Indianapolis
