= 300 North Meridian =

High-rise office building in Indianapolis, Indiana, US

Coordinates: 39°46′17″N 86°9′30″W

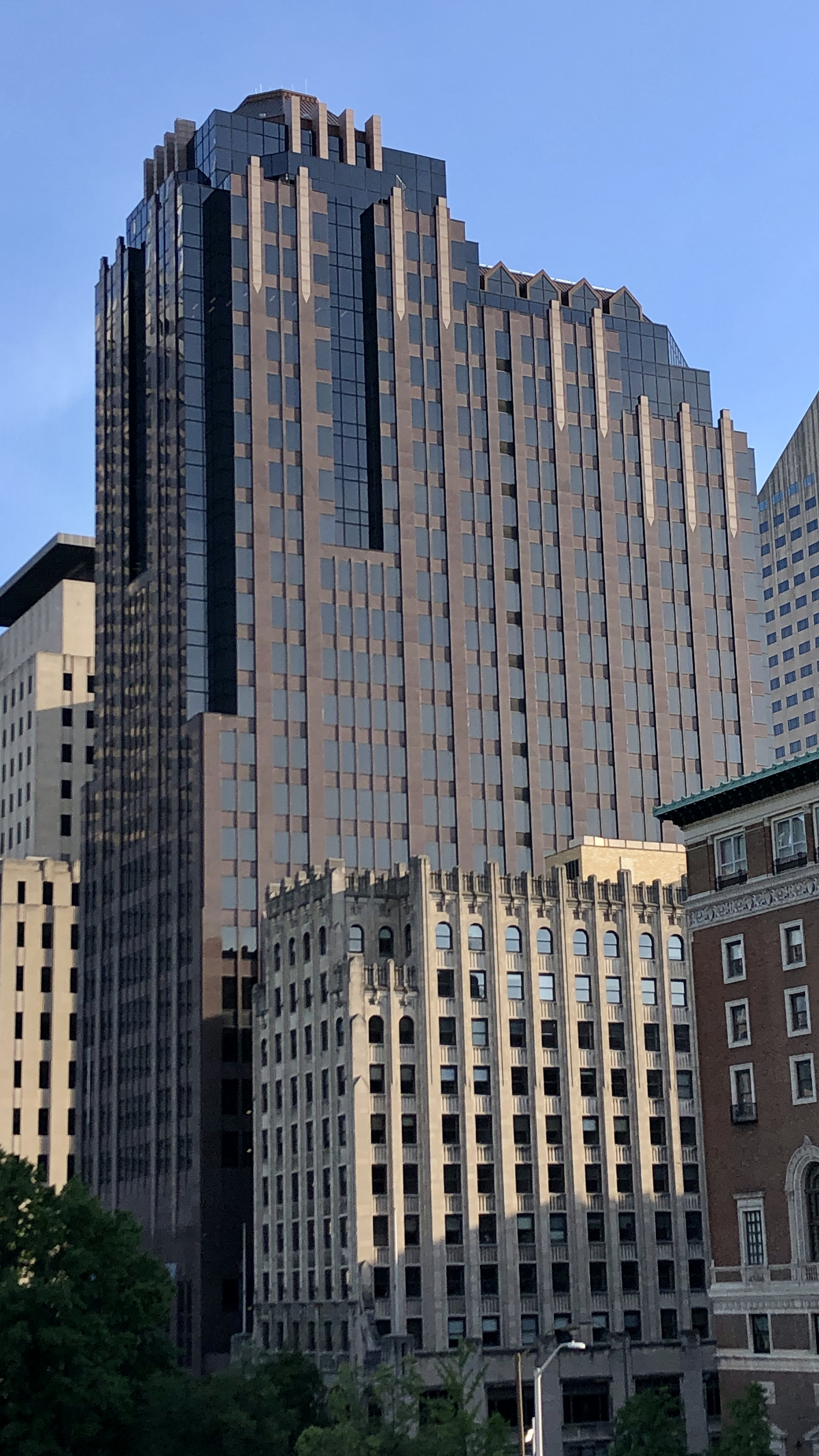
- 300 North Meridian in 2022

General information
- Type: Offices
- Location: 300 North Meridian Street; Indianapolis, Indiana, U.S.
- Completed: 1989

Height
- Roof: 408 ft. (124 m)

Technical details
- Floor count: 28
- Floor area: 509,994 sq ft (47,380.0 m^{2})

Design and construction
- Architect: Haldeman Miller Bregman Hamann (now BOKA Powell)
- Developer: Browning Investments, Inc.
- Structural engineer: American Consulting, Inc.
- Main contractor: F.A. Wilhelm Construction Company, Inc.; Browning Construction, Inc.

300 North Meridian is a high rise in Indianapolis, Indiana, United States. Construction started in 1987, financed by Browning Investments. The architects, Haldeman Miller Bregman Hamann (now BOKA Powell), built the outside with brownish-reddish granite and black windows, and capped the skyscraper with a copper-colored dome. Only the eastern side rises to the full height of the building; the northern and southern sides rise in a staircase shape toward the east. The architects intended 300 North Meridian's design to echo the adjacent Chamber of Commerce building. It was completed in 1989 and is currently the fifth-tallest building in the city.

300 North Meridian is primarily used for office space, although 9 of its floors are occupied by a parking garage. Of the building's 509,582 square feet of space, only 347,551 square feet are usable by offices. As of February 2014, 17.5% of the usable office space is vacant, and the building is owned by REI Real Estate Services. The building was valued by Marion County Assessor at $39 million in 2013. However, the value for that year was later readjusted to $29 million following findings by the Indiana Board of Tax Review in 2019.

One of the main tenants of 300 North Meridian is the law firm Faegre Drinker Biddle & Reath, known as Baker & Daniels at the time of construction. The group has a lobby on the 25th floor. Other tenants of the building include First Financial Bank, Ogletree Deakins, and Wells Fargo.

== Recognition ==
After its construction, 300 North Meridian received several awards from architecture and engineering associations. Some are listed below.

- 1989: Building Owners and Managers Association International's Urban Office Building of the Year Award
- 1990: American Concrete Institute, Outstanding Achievement in Concrete

== See also ==
- List of tallest buildings in Indianapolis
- List of tallest buildings in Indiana
