= Barnes and Thornburg Building =

Building in Indianapolis, Indiana, US

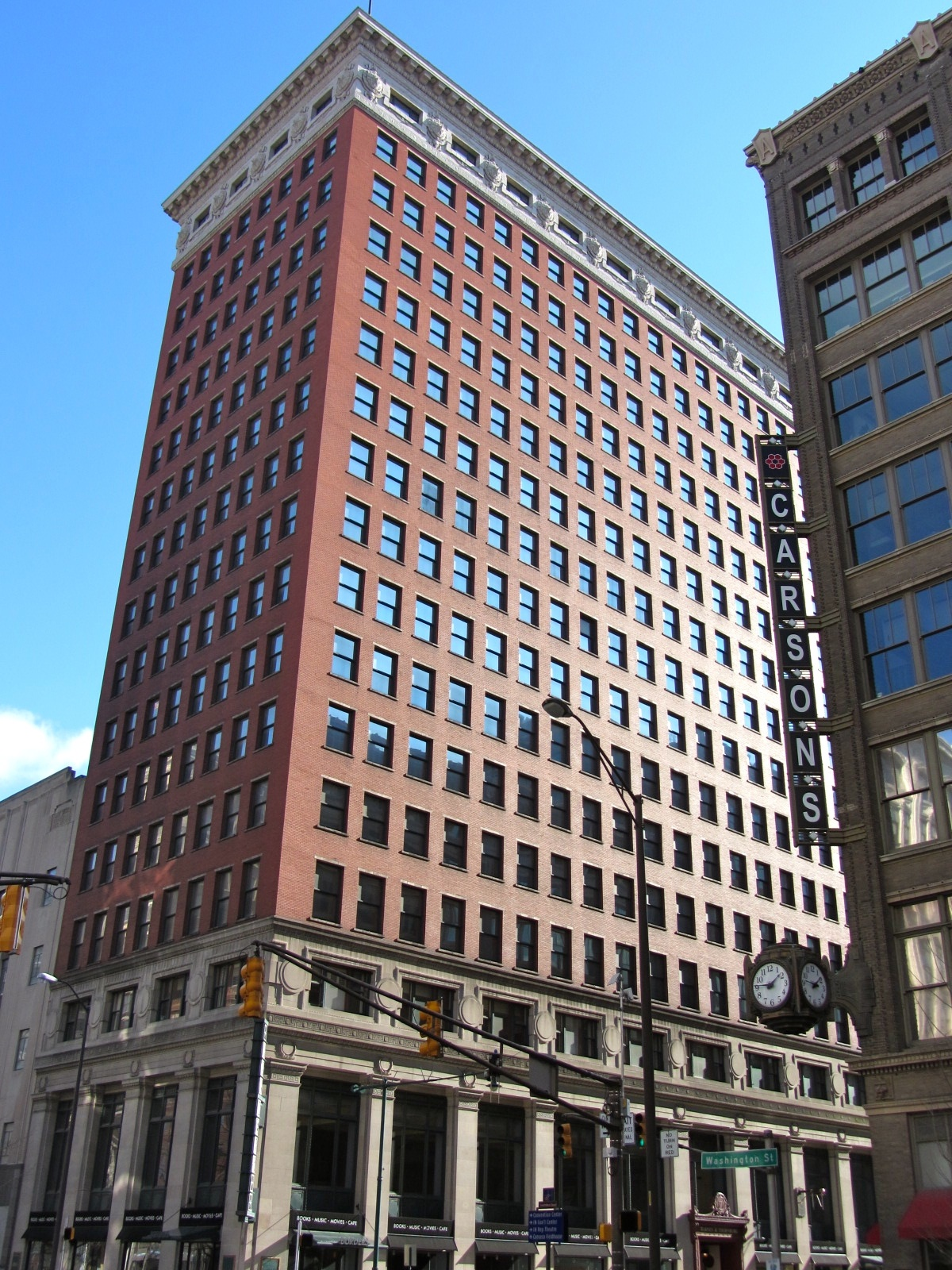
- Barnes and Thornburg Building viewed from the northwest.
- Former names: Merchants National Bank Building

General information
- Type: Offices
- Location: 11 South Meridian Street; Indianapolis, Indiana
- Completed: 1912

Height
- Roof: 245 ft (75 m)

Technical details
- Floor count: 17
- Merchants National Bank and Annex
- U.S. National Register of Historic Places
- U.S. Historic district – Contributing property
- Location within Indianapolis Location within Indianapolis
- Location: 11 S. Meridian St. and 7 E. Washington St., Indianapolis, Indiana
- Coordinates: 39°46′0″N 86°9′29″W
- Area: 1.8 acres (0.73 ha)
- Built: 1907
- Architect: D. H. Burnham & Company
- Architectural style: Chicago school
- NRHP reference No.: 82000066
- Added to NRHP: February 19, 1982

The Barnes and Thornburg Building is a high rise in Indianapolis, Indiana originally known as the Merchants National Bank Building. In 1905, the Merchants National Bank and Trust Company engaged the architectural firm of D. H. Burnham & Company of Chicago to design a new bank headquarters on the southeastern corner of the Washington and Meridian streets, the most important intersection in Indianapolis. Initial occupancy of the lower floors took place in 1908, while the upper floors were not completed until 1912.

== History ==
Daniel Burnham was one of the architects associated with the Chicago School. He designed the Merchants Bank Building using Louis Sullivan's formula of base, shaft, and capital. The base, consisting of the first floor and mezzanine, is of Indiana limestone. The shaft is of red brick, while the attic floor capital has profuse Classical moldings of terra cotta.

The 17 floors are used primarily for office space. The building and its annex at 7 E. Washington Street were added to National Register of Historic Places in 1982. It is located in the Washington Street-Monument Circle Historic District. Its current owner and primary occupant is the law firm of Barnes & Thornburg, LLP.

For nearly 70 years, Merchants National Bank and later Merchants National Corporation had used the building as its headquarters from 1908 until the completion of Merchants Plaza in June 1977.

Most of the first floor was, until 2011, most recently occupied by a Borders. It is now occupied by First Financial Bank.

== See also ==
- List of tallest buildings in Indianapolis
- National Register of Historic Places listings in Center Township, Marion County, Indiana
