= Market Square Center =

High-rise office building in Indianapolis, Indiana, U.S.

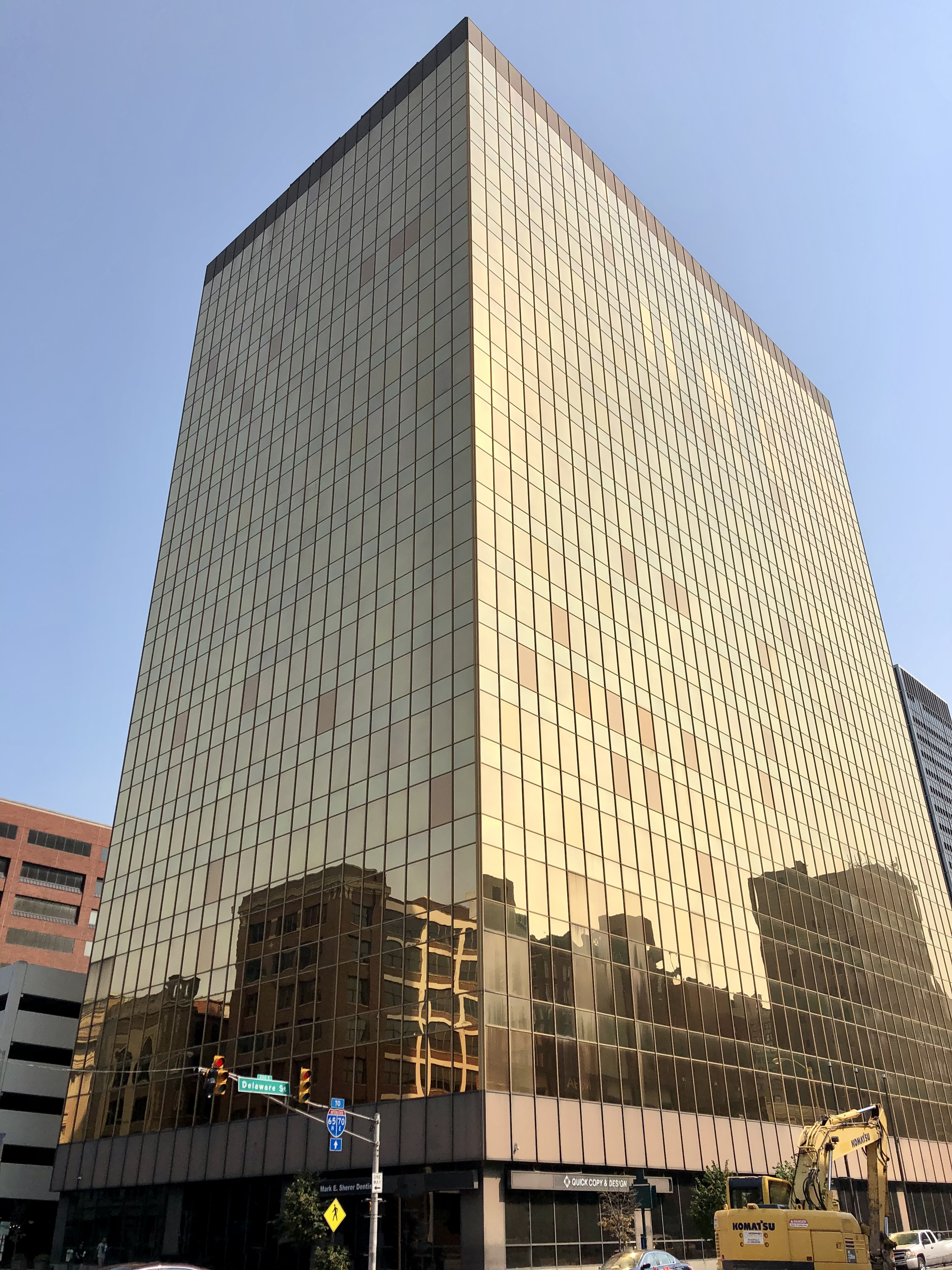

General information
- Type: Offices
- Location: 151 N. Delaware St. Indianapolis, Indiana, U.S.
- Coordinates: 39°46′10″N 86°9′14″W
- Completed: 1975

Height
- Roof: 283 ft (86 m)

Technical details
- Floor count: 20

Market Square Center is a high-rise building in Indianapolis, Indiana, United States. It was completed in 1975 and has 20 floors. It is primarily used for office space. It is best known for its unique gold reflective glass facade and is popularly nicknamed the "Gold Building".

In January 2025, it was announced that Market Square Center would undergo a $185 million renovation from office space to apartments as part of a larger City Market Redevelopment project led by Gershman Partners and Citimark.

== See also ==
- List of tallest buildings in Indianapolis
- List of tallest buildings in Indiana
