= Market Tower =

High-rise office building in Indianapolis, Indiana, US

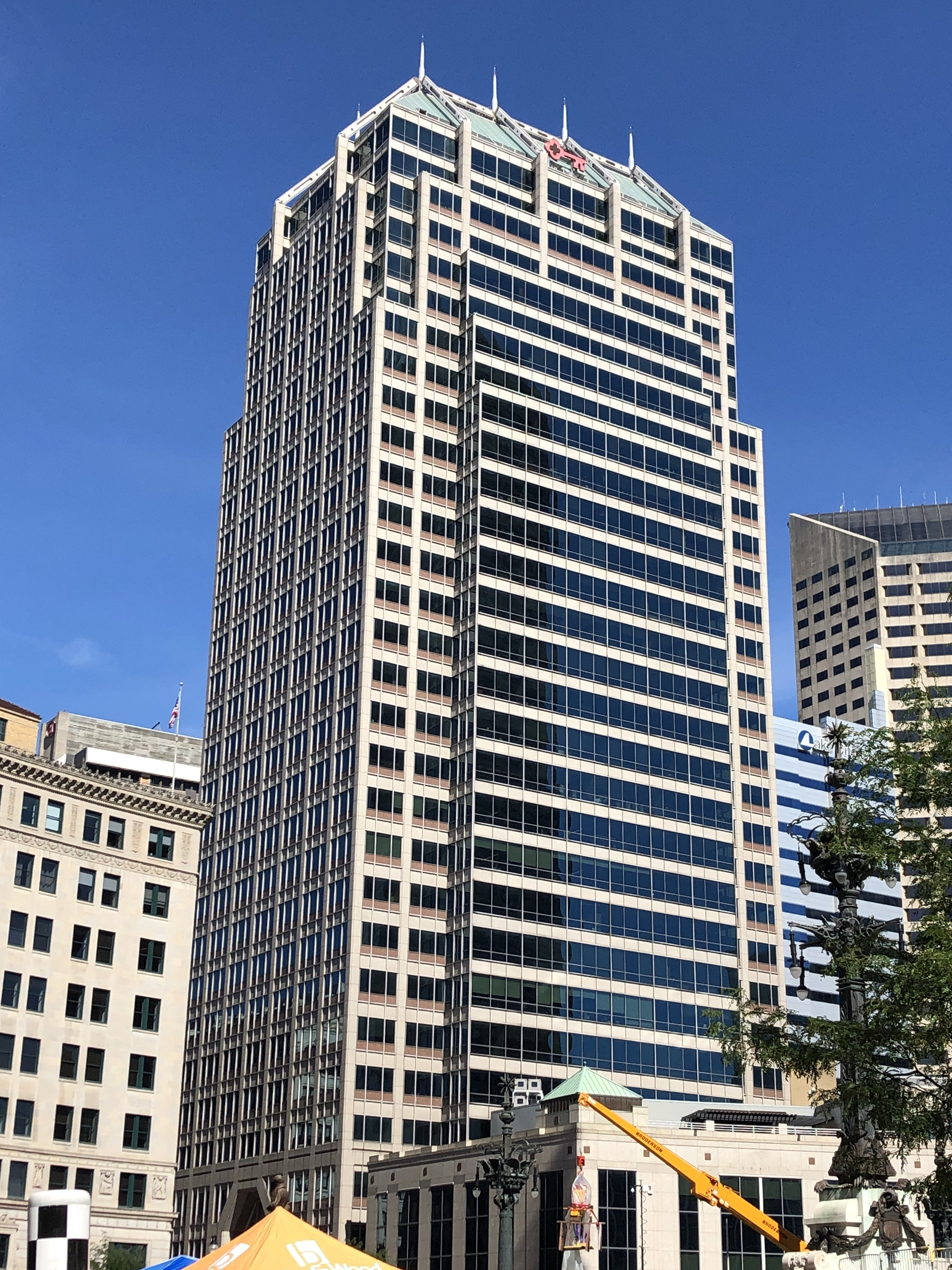
- Market Tower in 2022

General information
- Status: Completed
- Type: Office
- Location: 10 W. Market St. Indianapolis, Indiana, U.S.
- Coordinates: 39°46′8″N 86°9′34″W
- Topped-out: April 9, 1988; 38 years ago
- Completed: October 18, 1988; 38 years ago
- Cost: US$92 million
- Owner: Square Deal Capital

Height
- Height: 421 ft (128 m)

Technical details
- Floor count: 32
- Floor area: 569,949 sq ft (52,950.0 m^{2})

Design and construction
- Architecture firm: Lohan Associates, Inc.
- Developer: Mansur Development Corporation
- Main contractor: Huber, Hunt & Nichols, Inc.

Website
- www.market-tower.com

Market Tower is a high-rise office building located at the northeast corner of Illinois and Market streets in Indianapolis, Indiana, United States. At the time of its completion in 1988, Market Tower was the largest privately financed speculative office project developed in the city. It is the fourth-tallest building in Indianapolis and the fifth-tallest building in Indiana. Market Tower is the second-tallest reinforced concrete building in the state, after the Indiana Michigan Power Center in Fort Wayne, Indiana.

== History ==
Market Tower was topped-out on April 9, 1988. At the time of the building's dedication on October 18, 1988, it was 60% pre-leased.

In 1991, the Indiana Department of Natural Resources installed a nest box atop Market Tower as part of a statewide species reintroduction program for peregrine falcons. The nest box is located on the southeast corner of the tower's 31st floor. Since the first pair took roost in 1995, peregrine falcons have continuously occupied the site as recently as 2021.

In May 2014, the building's owner, HDG Mansur, was ordered to sell the property after defaulting on loans worth US$60 million. Zeller Realty Group purchased Market Tower for US$52.7 million in October 2014. Over the ensuing years, Zeller completed US$7 million in renovations then sold the building to Square Deal Capital in 2017.

According to the Indianapolis Business Journal, building amenities include a cafe, a conference center, a fitness center, and a restaurant. In 2022, the tower was 85% occupied, with tenants including multinational law firm Dentons and the United States Attorney's office for the United States District Court for the Southern District of Indiana.

== Design ==
The building's façade appears much like a grid, clad in red and gray granite and metal mullions framing tinted windows. A series of setbacks gives way to a buttressed, copper roof topped with eight spires. Beginning on the second floor of its eastern façade, the tower's floorplate cantilevers over an alleyway. The building contains a three-level underground parking garage and a three-story atrium fronting W. Market St.

Market Tower's postmodern design borrows architectural elements found in neighboring landmarks. Cornelius Alig, president of Mansur Development Corporation in 1988, noted that the company "made it our priority" that the tower's design complement existing architecture near Monument Circle.

Steve Mannheimer, architecture critic writing for The Indianapolis Star, remarked on the influences:

"The step-backs echo the Circle Tower. (Note: Completed in 1930, Circle Tower was the first building in the city to employ setbacks in its design.) The bays pay some homage to the Columbia Club, (Note: A multi-story oriel window protrudes from the main façade of the Columbia Club, similar to the cantilevered eastern façade of Market Tower.) as does the copper roof, which also harkens to the City Market. The double-height main entrance on Market Street is a reminder of the Guaranty Building. (...) Market Tower is enriched by a set of historical motifs that make it — despite its restrained and hence almost 'international' stylistic rendering — an Indianapolis building much more than other Downtown skyscrapers."

== See also ==
- List of tallest buildings in Indianapolis
- List of tallest buildings in Indiana
