= List of tallest buildings in Indiana =

Location of the state of Indiana in the United States, highlighted in red.

This list of tallest buildings in Indiana ranks skyscrapers in the state of Indiana, United States of America by height. The tallest building in Indiana is Salesforce Tower in Indianapolis, which contains 49 floors and is 811 ft (247 m) tall. The second-tallest building in the state is the OneAmerica Tower, also in Indianapolis, which rises 533 feet (162 m).

== Tallest buildings ==
This list ranks Indiana buildings that stand at least 268 feet (82 m) tall, based on standard height measurement. This includes spires and architectural details but does not provide antenna masts or other objects not part of the original plans. Existing structures are included for ranking purposes based on present height.

Rank	Name	Image	Height ft / m	Floors	Year	City	Notes
1	Salesforce Tower		811 (247)	49	1990	Indianapolis	Has been the tallest building in the city and the state since 1990. Tallest building constructed in Indianapolis in the 1990s. Formerly known as Bank One Tower and Chase Tower.
2	OneAmerica Tower		533 (162)	38	1982	Indianapolis	Tallest building constructed in the city during the 1980s. Formerly known as the AUL Tower.
3	Regions Tower		504 (154)	37	1970	Indianapolis	Tallest building completed in Indianapolis during the 1970s.
4	Indiana Michigan Power Center		442 (135)	27	1982	Fort Wayne	Tallest building in Fort Wayne since 1982, fourth tallest building in Indiana, and tallest outside of Indianapolis. Formerly known as One Summit Square.
5	Market Tower		421 (128)	32	1988	Indianapolis	
6	300 North Meridian		408 (124)	28	1989	Indianapolis	
7	BMO Plaza		401 (122)	31	1988	Indianapolis	
8	JW Marriott Indianapolis		376 (115)	34	2011	Indianapolis	
9	City-County Building		372 (113)	28	1962	Indianapolis	Tallest building constructed in the city during the 1960s. One of the last public observation decks in the city. Located on 28th floor.
10	101 West Ohio		360.13 (110)	22	1987	Indianapolis	
11	Indianapolis International Airport Air Traffic Control Tower		340 (104)	–	2005	Indianapolis	Air traffic control
12	PNC Center		339 (103)	28	1970	Fort Wayne	Tallest building in Fort Wayne from 1970 to 1982, currently the 11th tallest building in the state of Indiana. Formerly known as Fort Wayne National Bank Building and National City Center.
13	Liberty Tower		331 (101)	25	1970	South Bend	
14	Four Winds Casino Resort Tower		-	23	2023	South Bend	317-room hotel tower, 10,000 SF spa, 24,000 SF conference and event center, outdoor rooftop pool deck, 3-meal cafe. Groundbreaking was held in 2019, and the Grand Opening occurred on March 1, 2023. The Hotel and Casino are owned by the Pokagon Band of Potawatomi Indians.
15	AT&T Building		321 (98)	22	1932	Indianapolis	When completed in the 1930s, the building was only seven floors high; additions in the 1940s and 1960s brought it to its current height
16	Lincoln Bank Tower		312 (95)	22	1930	Fort Wayne	At completion, was the tallest building in Indiana
17	Capital Center South Tower		311 (95)	22	1987	Indianapolis	Connected via atrium to the 26th-tallest building in Indianapolis, Fifth Third Bank Tower
18	Hilton Indianapolis		302 (92)	18	1971	Indianapolis	The building was originally constructed as the headquarters of Blue Cross and Blue Shield of Indiana (now Anthem)
=19	Riley Towers I		295 (90)	30	1963	Indianapolis	Tallest residential buildings in Indiana
=19	Riley Towers II		295 (90)	30	1963	Indianapolis	Tallest residential buildings in Indiana
21	360 Market Square		290 (88)	28	2018	Indianapolis	
22	Conrad Indianapolis		287 (87)	23	2006	Indianapolis	Tallest building completed in Indianapolis during the 2000s
=23	220 Meridian		284 (87)	23	1974	Indianapolis	Formerly known as the SBC 220 Building and AT&T 220 Building
=23	Indiana State Soldiers' and Sailors' Monument		284 (87)	–	1902	Indianapolis	Tallest structure in Indianapolis until the completion of the City-County Building in 1962
25	Market Square Center		283 (86)	20	1975	Indianapolis	Also known as the Gold Building
=26	Sidney & Lois Eskenazi Hospital		280 (85)	11	2013	Indianapolis	
=26	Spa Blu Tower		280 (85)	22	2009	Michigan City	
28	Lucas Oil Stadium		270 (82)	–	2008	Indianapolis	
=29	CityView on Meridian		268 (82)	20	1966	Indianapolis	
=29	Hyatt Regency Indianapolis / PNC Center		268 (82)	22	1977	Indianapolis	Tallest mixed-use building in Indianapolis

== See also ==
- List of tallest buildings in Fort Wayne
- List of tallest buildings in Indianapolis
- List of tallest buildings in South Bend
- List of tallest buildings by U.S. state
