= JW Marriott Indianapolis =

High-rise hotel and conference center in Indianapolis, Indiana, US

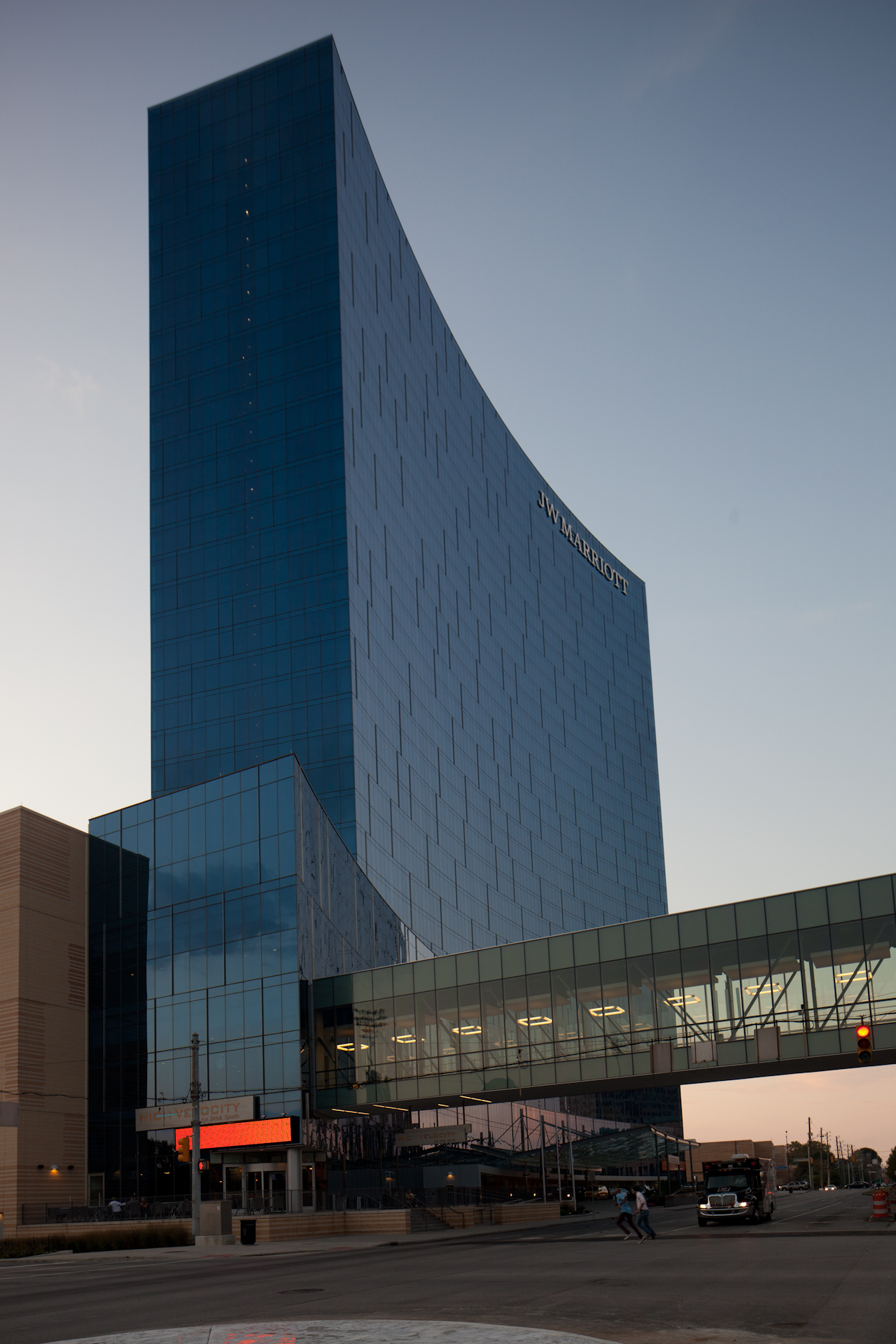
- JW Marriott Indianapolis
- Interactive map of the JW Marriott Indianapolis area

General information
- Status: Open
- Type: Hotel
- Location: Indianapolis, Indiana
- Coordinates: 39°46′0″N 86°10′05.5″W
- Construction started: May 29, 2008; 17 years ago
- Completed: 2011
- Opened: February 4, 2011; 15 years ago
- Cost: $450 million for Marriott Complex
- Owner: White Lodging
- Operator: White Lodging

Height
- Roof: 376 ft (115 m)

Technical details
- Floor count: 34
- Floor area: 2,535,418 sq ft (235,548.0 m^{2})
- Lifts/elevators: 38

Design and construction
- Architects: HOK Chicago (Design Architect and AOR Hotel Tower) and CSO Architects (AOR Podium)
- Developer: White Properties
- Structural engineer: Magnusson Klemencic Associates
- Main contractor: Hunt Construction Group

JW Marriott Indianapolis is a hotel in downtown Indianapolis, adjacent to the Indiana Convention Center. The new JW Marriott Indianapolis is part of the $450 million Marriott Place, consisting of five Marriott hotels all connected to the Indiana Convention Center. The City of Indianapolis contributed $48 million to the project. The hotel is 34 floors and 376 feet (115 m) tall, making it the 7th-tallest building in Indianapolis and tallest hotel in Indiana. The facility also has a 950 space underground parking garage. It is the largest JW Marriott hotel in the United States based on its 1,013 guest rooms and is owned and managed by White Lodging.

== Facilities ==
The JW Marriott has 1013 rooms with 637 double rooms, 343 lavish king rooms, and 25 luxury suites. The hotel features 54 meeting rooms with a total of 104,000 square feet, three restaurants, and the largest ballroom of any hotel in the Midwest and also one of the largest Marriott ballrooms in the world. The JW Marriott Indianapolis has three restaurants.

According to the Indianapolis Business Journal, the JW Marriott Indianapolis has 600 full-time employees. As of 2026, three dining options were located in the hotel, including High Velocity, Dean's Steak and Seafood, and Starbucks.

== Window displays ==
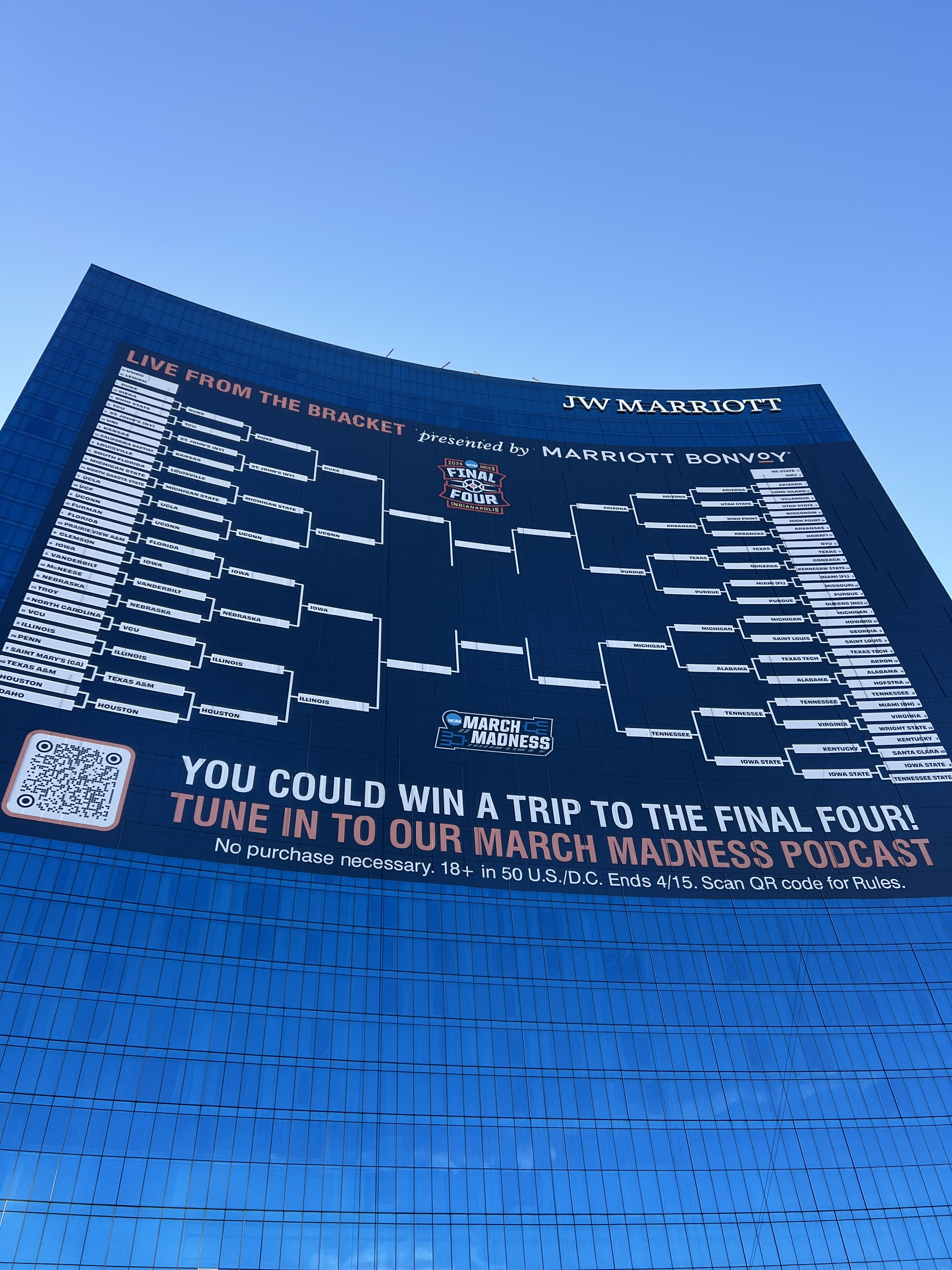
The 2026 NCAA Men's Division I basketball tournament bracket graphic as displayed on the JW Marriott Indianapolis

Since its opening in 2011, the JW Marriott Indianapolis has displayed numerous "jumbo" graphics on its east-facing concave curtain wall. Indianapolis-based Sport Graphics is the exclusive partner for the displays, which have included the Vince Lombardi Trophy (commemorating Super Bowl XLVI), the College Football Playoff National Championship Trophy (commemorating the 2022 College Football Playoff National Championship), an NCAA bracket (commemorating the 2015 NCAA Men's Final Four, the complete 2021 NCAA Division I men's basketball tournament, and the 2026 NCAA Men's Final Four), the Borg-Warner Trophy (commemorating the 100th running of the Indianapolis 500), Taylor Swift for The Eras Tour, as well as various graphics for the Indianapolis Colts, Indiana Pacers, and Indiana Fever.

== See also ==
- List of tallest buildings in Indianapolis
- List of tallest buildings in Indiana
