= AT&T Building (Indianapolis) =

High-rise office building in Indianapolis, Indiana, United States

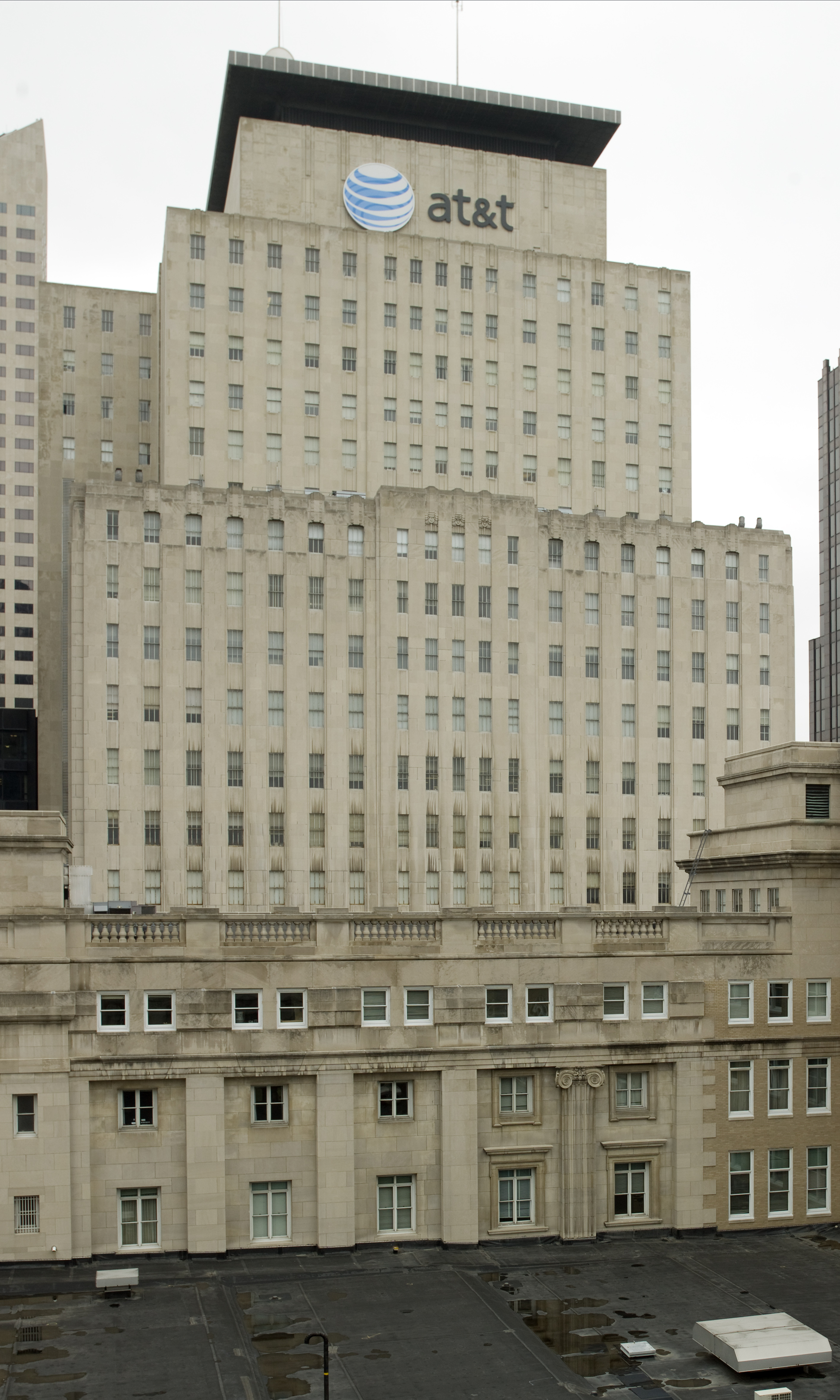
- Interactive map of the AT&T Building area

General information
- Type: Offices
- Location: 240 North Meridian Street; Indianapolis, Indiana, U.S.
- Coordinates: 39°46′15.34″N 86°09′30.36″W
- Completed: 1932

Height
- Roof: 321 ft (98 m)

Technical details
- Floor count: 22

The AT&T Building, now known as 220 Meridian, is a high rise located at 240 North Meridian Street in Indianapolis, Indiana. It was opened in 1932 and is 22 stories tall. It was primarily used for office space and was the headquarters for AT&T in Indiana until the 2017 sale and redevelopment of the building. As of 2024, the size of the building is 554,000 square feet.

== Central Union Telephone Company building ==
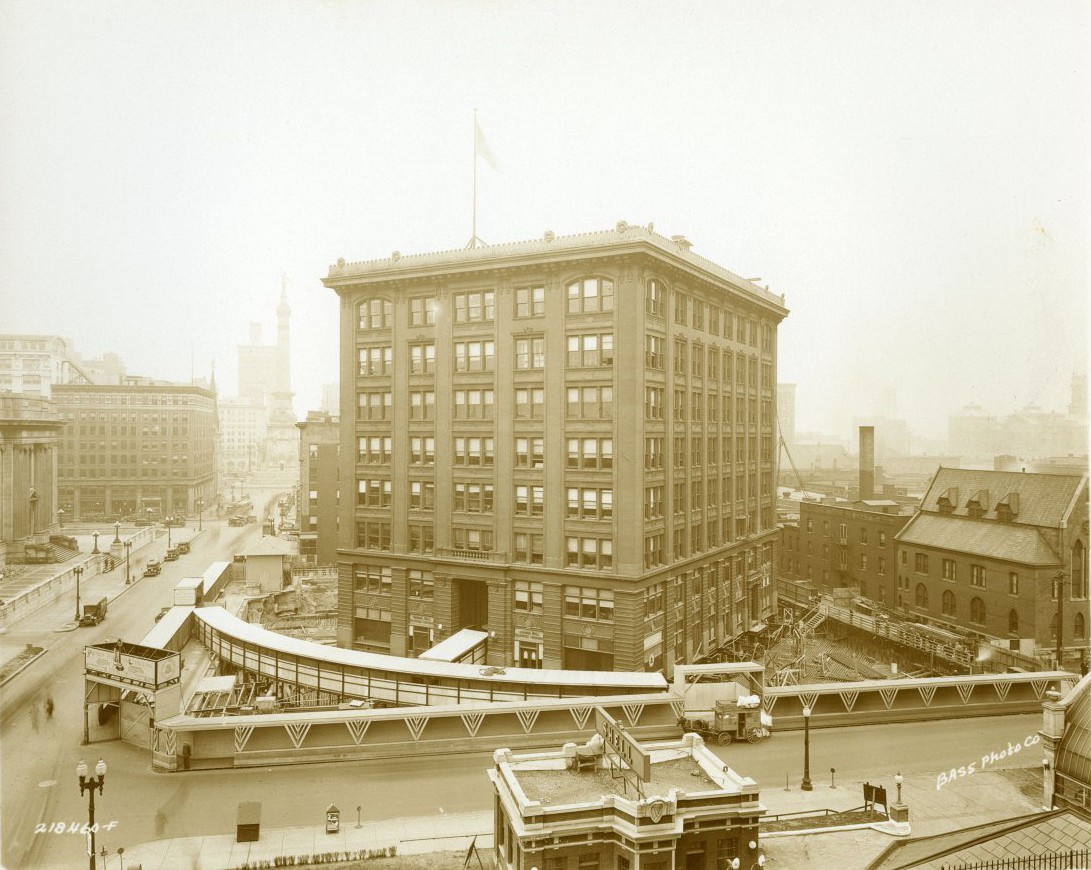
The old headquarters in the middle of being moved

The Central Union Telephone Company built a headquarters building on the corner of Meridian and New York Streets in 1907. Indiana Bell bought Central Union in 1929, but found the existing headquarters inadequate. Originally, the old building was to be demolished to make way for a new building on the site. However, that would have caused disruptions in telephone service. Kurt Vonnegut Sr., the architect of the new building, suggested moving it to the adjacent lot at 13 West New York Street.

Over a 30- or 34-day period, the 11,000-short-ton (10,000 t) building was shifted 52 feet (16 m) south, rotated 90 degrees, and then shifted again 100 feet (30 m) west. Completed on November 12 or 14, 1930, this was all done without interrupting customer telephone service or telephone business operations. Gas, heat, electric, water, and communication lines were modified before and during construction to add flexibility or length as needed.

The new headquarters was completed in 1932, and was seven stories tall. It was later expanded in the 1940s and 1960s to bring it to its current size and height. The original building that had been moved was demolished in 1963.

== Sale of the building and redevelopment ==
=== Sale of the building ===
In 2017, Keystone Realty Group purchased 220 Meridian and began a redevelopment of the building. The redevelopment by Keystone is for a mixed-use development comprising luxury apartments, restaurant and retail space, as well as three floors that maintain office space for AT&T. The building was sold due to underutilization by AT&T.

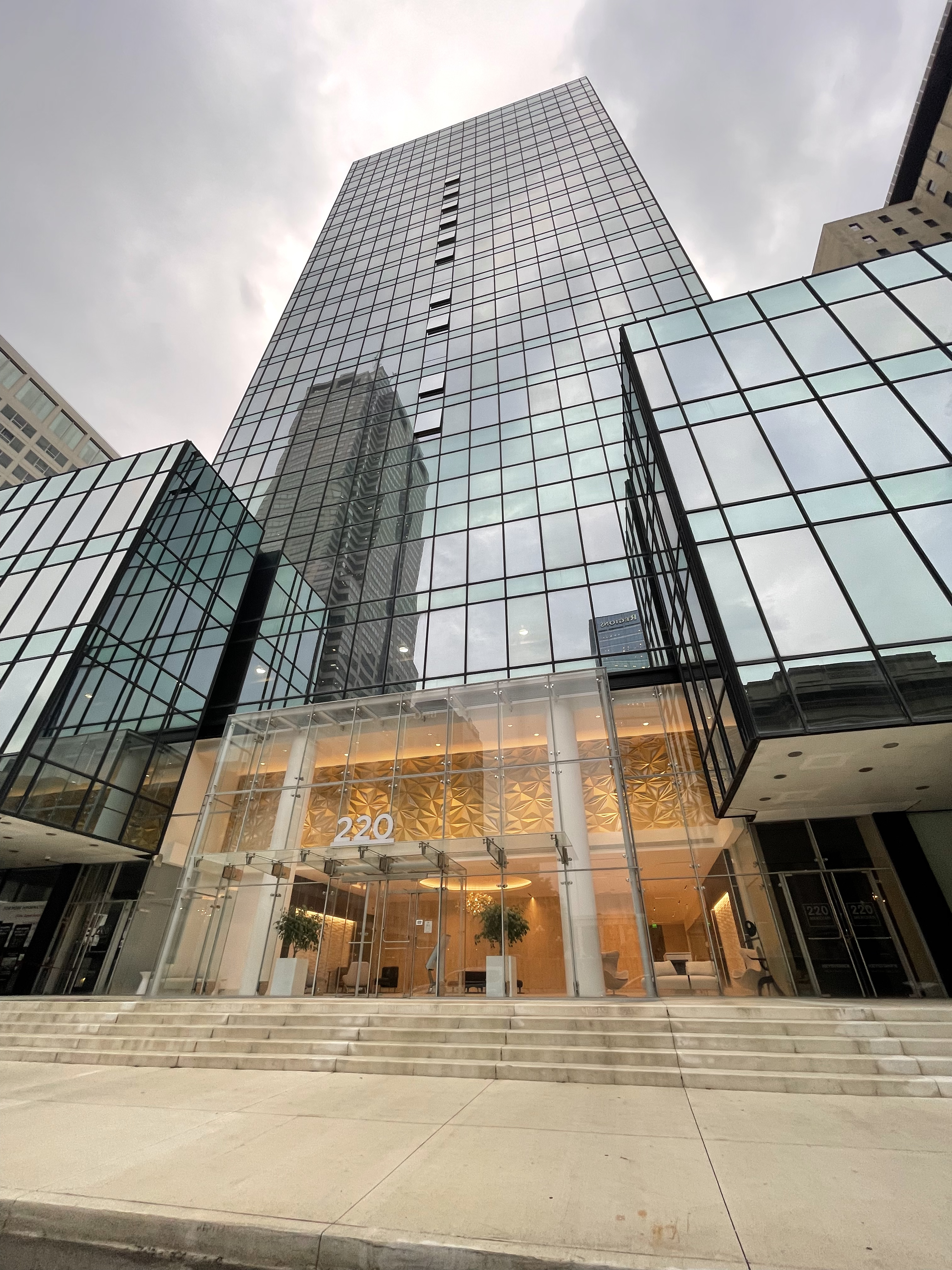
220 Meridian in June 2022

=== Redevelopment ===
The redevelopment of the building was completed in 2023. As a result of the redevelopment project, the building was awarded the 2024 CoStar Impact Award of the year for Indianapolis. The redevelopment yielded 216 residential units, including 57 apartments, and created hundreds of jobs. The project also involved the installment of a 16,575-gallon pool on the 11th-floor rooftop which is the highest of its kind in Indiana.

== See also ==
- List of tallest buildings in Indianapolis
- List of tallest buildings in Indiana
