= Riley Towers =

High-rise residential buildings in Indianapolis, Indiana, US

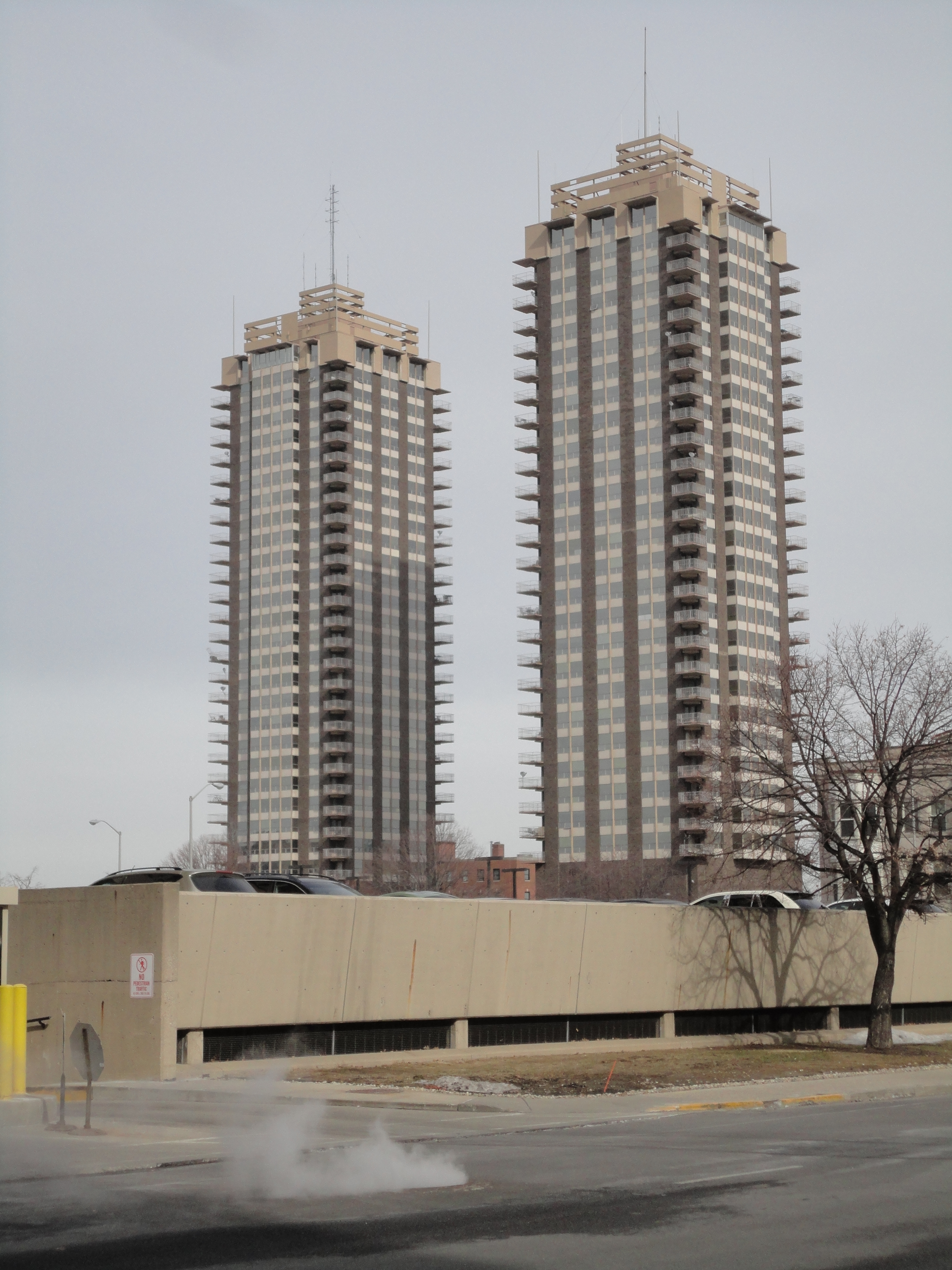
- Riley Towers I and II in 2011
- Interactive map of the Riley Towers area
- Former names: James Whitcomb Riley Center, Towers at Riley Center

General information
- Status: Completed
- Type: Residential apartments
- Location: 225 E. North St. (Tower I); 600 N. Alabama St. (Tower II); 700 N. Alabama St. (Tower III); Indianapolis, Indiana 46204
- Coordinates: 39°46′30.5″N 86°9′10.2″W
- Construction started: May 1962
- Topped-out: December 1962
- Opened: May 1963
- Cost: $10.5 million
- Owner: Barrett & Stokely, Inc.

Height
- Height: 295 ft (90 m) (Towers I & II); 157 ft (48 m) (Tower III)

Technical details
- Floor count: 30 (Towers I & II); 16 (Tower III)
- Lifts/elevators: 5
- Grounds: 4.81 acres (1.95 ha)

Design and construction
- Architecture firm: Perkins and Will
- Developer: Riley Center Corporation
- Main contractor: Huber, Hunt & Nichols, Inc.

Other information
- Number of units: 524

Website
- www.rileytowers.com

Riley Towers are two residential high-rise apartment buildings in downtown Indianapolis, Indiana, United States. Riley Towers were conceived as part of an expansive urban renewal project known as Project H. The complex was constructed between 1962 and 1963. Towers I and II have 30 floors and Tower III has 16 floors. Riley Towers I and II are the tallest residential buildings in the state of Indiana. The towers are distinctive for their cantilevered corner balconies.

The complex is owned and managed by Indianapolis-based Barrett & Stokely, Inc., which purchased the property in 1993. Amenities include a three-level parking garage; a private outdoor swimming pool, lounge, and grilling area; a fitness center; and ground-level retail. An open-air skyway spans E. North St., connecting Tower I to the complex's parking structure.

The complex is named for famed poet James Whitcomb Riley, whose museum home stands in the nearby Lockerbie Square Historic District.

== History ==
Under director Calvin S. Hamilton, the Metropolitan Planning Department prepared a downtown master plan in 1958, which recommended the clearance of "declining" properties in the district for redevelopment. Among the first city-supported urban renewal projects, Project H covered 42 acres (17 ha) in the northeast quadrant of downtown Indianapolis. In 1961, local investors formed the Riley Center Corporation and announced plans to build a four-phased, $40 million "apartment city" consisting of ten high-rises containing more than 1,800 units. Perkins and Will was hired to design the complex.

Beginning in 1962, Phase I included the redevelopment of 4 acres (1.6 ha) bordered by Hudson St. (west); N. Alabama St. (east); Fort Wayne Ave. and E. St. Clair St. (north); and E. Michigan St. (south). Plans included the construction of two 30-story buildings and a third 16-story building containing 500 apartment units, a parking garage, and a restaurant building. However, a year after construction, the complex remained only 50 percent leased forcing the cancellation of future phases. Some 11 acres (4.5 ha) from Project H were later developed in the early-1980s as a low-rise condominium community called Renaissance Place.

Boston-based Windsor Property Group and local developer Joseph F. Sexton entered into a partnership to purchase the complex in 1987 with plans for a $6.5 million renovation. Renovations began in March 1988. Soon after, complaints of mismanagement by residents and maintenance staff, coupled with financial problems, stalled the project. Unable to complete the renovations, the partnership defaulted on a loan from Bank of New England whose assets were seized by the Federal Deposit Insurance Corporation. In December 1992, ownership was transferred to lender Fleet-Norstar Financial Group, which held a $23.5 million mortgage on the complex.

The FDIC sold the complex to local real estate management company Barrett & Stokely in September 1993 for $10 million. Over the following year, the company completed $3.5 million in renovations, including those that stalled under the previous ownership. Among the changes were new roofs, HVAC and security systems, and repair of the towers' brick and mortar veneer. The restaurant building was also converted into a leasing office, fitness center, and community meeting room.

On the evening of January 15, 1992, two decorative spires from atop Tower II collapsed onto Alabama St., striking an unoccupied vehicle. No injuries were reported.

In August 2010, the complex's original 450-space parking garage was demolished and rebuilt for $6 million.

All three buildings continued to have sporadic water infiltration problems as they aged. In 2021, the outer layer of bricks on the façade of the 16-story Tower III was replaced with new bricks with an air membrane being placed between the bricks and the layer of block in the walls. The new bricks are custom made to be as close a match as possible to the original ones. The successful completion of work on that building led the owners to obtain approval from the Metropolitan Development Commission Regional Center hearing examiner to undertake the same repairs on the Towers I and II in August 2022. Work is expected to be completed by June 2023.

On June 5, 2025, during a fire approximately 11 units were impacted by fire damage, water damage, and/or smoke damage.

== Notable residents ==
- Otis Bowen, 44th Governor of Indiana
- Scott Dixon, professional racing driver
- Edgar Whitcomb, 43rd Governor of Indiana

== See also ==
- List of tallest buildings in Indiana
- List of tallest buildings in Indianapolis
