= Indiana Bell =

Telecommunications company

Indiana Bell Telephone Company, Incorporated
- Type: Subsidiary
- Industry: Telecommunications
- Founded: 1920; 106 years ago
- Headquarters: Indianapolis, Indiana, U.S.
- Products: Local Telephone Service
- Parent: AT&T Corporation (1920-1983); Ameritech (1984-1999); SBC Communications (1999-2005); AT&T (2005-present)
- Website: http://www.att.com

Indiana Bell Telephone Company, Incorporated, is the Bell Operating Company serving Indiana. It is an indirect subsidiary of AT&T Inc., owned by AT&T Teleholdings.

== History ==
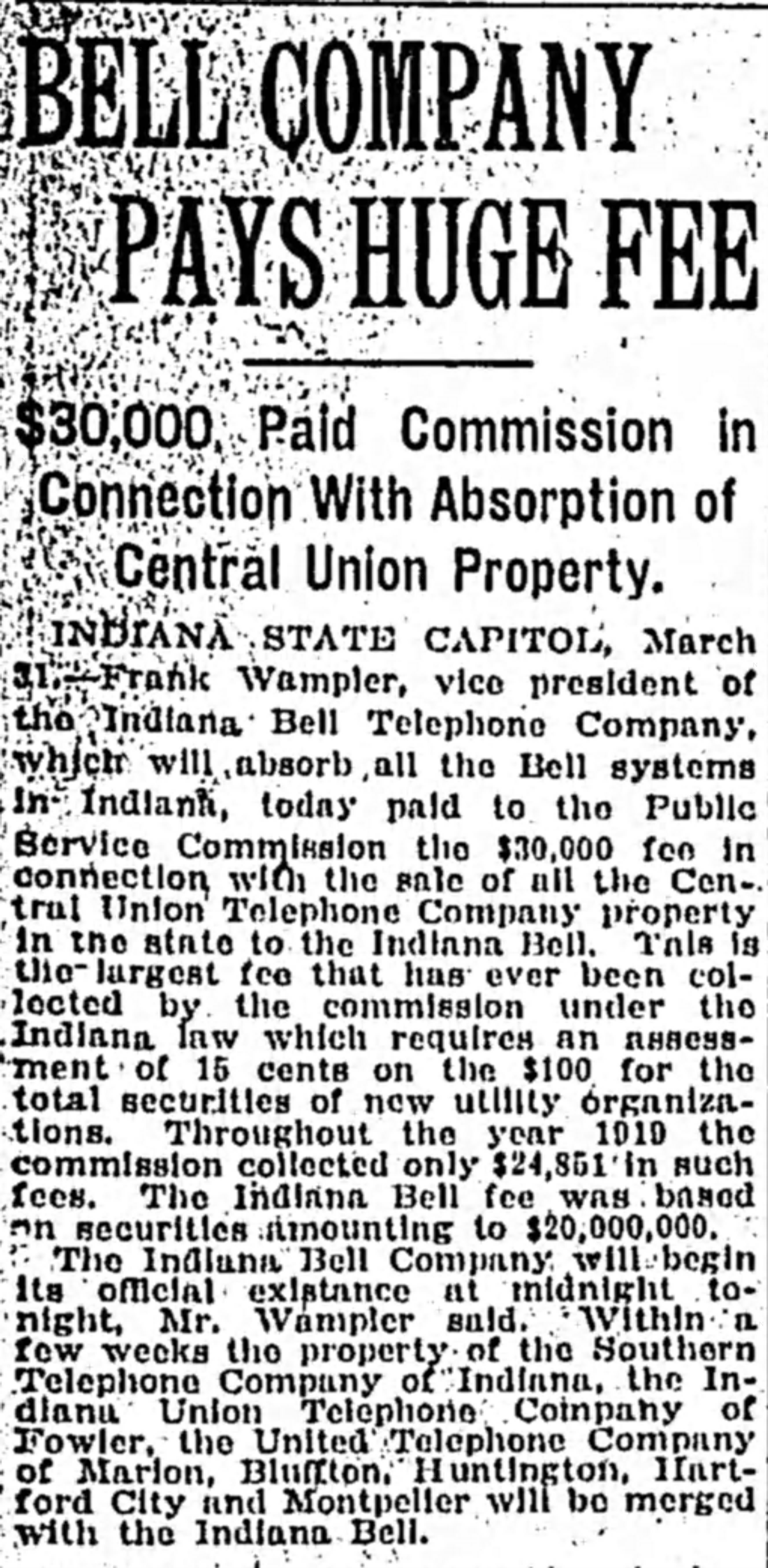
Official formation of the Indiana Bell Telephone Company, April 1, 1920

Indiana Bell was founded in 1920 to function as the central Bell telephone company in the state of Indiana. It purchased the Indiana operations of the Central Union Telephone Company and also purchased the Indianapolis Telephone Company. It continued to expand throughout the 1920s through acquisitions.

In 1930, Indiana Bell's headquarters building in Indianapolis was relocated 52 feet (16 m) to the south and 100 feet (30 m) west of its original location while employees continued working in it. The move was an engineering feat of its time.

Throughout the 1940s and 1950s the company continued to expand by acquiring many smaller telephone companies throughout the state.

After the 1984 Bell System Divestiture, Indiana Bell became a part of Ameritech, one of the seven original Regional Bell Operating Companies.

In 1990, the independent board of directors of Indiana Bell was dissolved.

=== Presidents ===
- Edgar S. Bloom, 1920–1921
- Curtis H. Rottger, 1921–1930
- James F. Carroll, 1930–1946
- William A. Hughes, 1946–1948
- Harry S. Hanna, 1948–1960
- Roy C. Echols, 1960–1968
- Thomas S. Nurnberger, 1968–1970
- David K. Easlick, 1970–1971
- James E. Olson, 1972–1974
- John W. Arbuckle, 1974–1976
- Delbert C. "Bud" Staley, 1976–1978
- William L. Weiss, 1978v1981
- Philip A. Campbell, 1981–1982
- William P. Vititoe, 1982–1983
- Ramon L. Humke, 1983–1989
- Richard C. Notebaert, 1989–1992
- Thomas J. Reiman, 1992–1994
- Kent A. Lebherz, 1994–2000
- George S. Fleetwood, 2000–2013
- William L. Soards II, 2013–2026

=== Corporate rebranding ===
The Indiana Bell name continued to be used until January 1993, when Ameritech dropped all individual Bell Operating Company names in favor of using the corporate name for marketing purposes, and Indiana Bell began doing business under the trade name Ameritech Indiana. In 2001, two years after Ameritech was acquired by SBC Communications, SBC rebranded all of its companies to include the SBC name, and Indiana Bell began doing business as SBC Ameritech Indiana. In 2002, SBC rebranded all of its companies simply as "SBC" for use as a national brand. Indiana Bell then started doing business as SBC Indiana. After AT&T Corporation was acquired by SBC Communications for $16 billion, SBC renamed itself AT&T, resulting in Indiana Bell taking the trade name AT&T Indiana.
