= White Lodging =

American hotel management company

White Lodging Services
- Type: Private
- Industry: Hospitality
- Founded: 1985; 41 years ago
- Founder: Bruce White
- Headquarters: Merrillville, Indiana, US
- Key people: Jean-Luc Barone (Chief Executive Officer)
- Website: whitelodging.com

White Lodging Services Corporation is a privately held American hotel management company. As of 2025, it manages about 165 hotels. White Lodging also owns and manages numerous restaurants and rooftop bars.

White Lodging was founded in 1985 by Bruce W. White, who was the company's chairman. In January 2022, Jean-Luc Barone was named the company's CEO, replacing Ken Barrett who remains as president. The company is headquartered in Merrillville, Indiana.

In 2014 and 2015, White Lodging was the subject of data security breaches at numerous locations that it manages. In December 2017, White Lodging announced that it would be selling 82 of its suburban hotel management contracts to Interstate Hotels & Resorts, cutting its hotel portfolio in half and resulting in the loss of more than 50 corporate office staff.

== Awards and recognition ==
White Lodging was recognized as one of the 62 global winners of the 2025 Gallup Exceptional Workplace Award for the fifth consecutive year. In the previous year, the company was also named one of 60 global winners of the 2024 Gallup Exceptional Workplace Award, representing its fourth recognition. White Lodging employs over 6,500 associates across nearly 165 hotels and more than 50 restaurants and bars. Additionally, in September 2024, J.D. Power ranked White Lodging third in guest satisfaction among third-party hotel management companies in North America.
