= Circle Centre Mall =

Defunct shopping mall in Indianapolis, Indiana, US

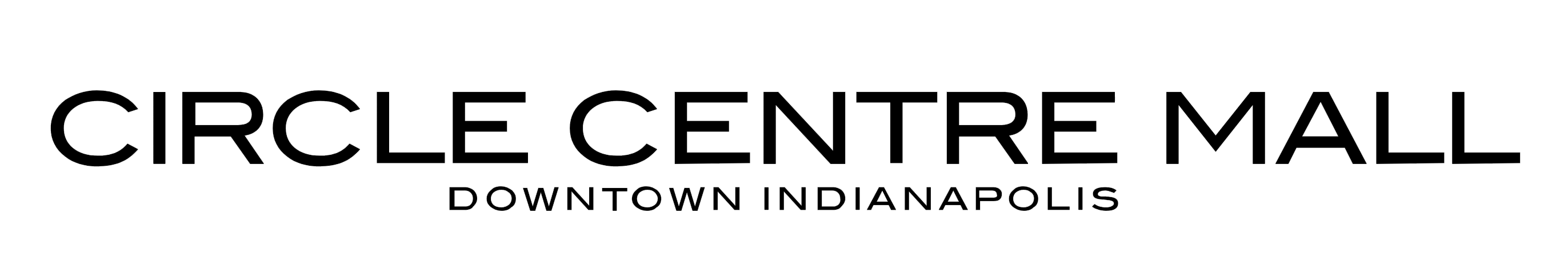

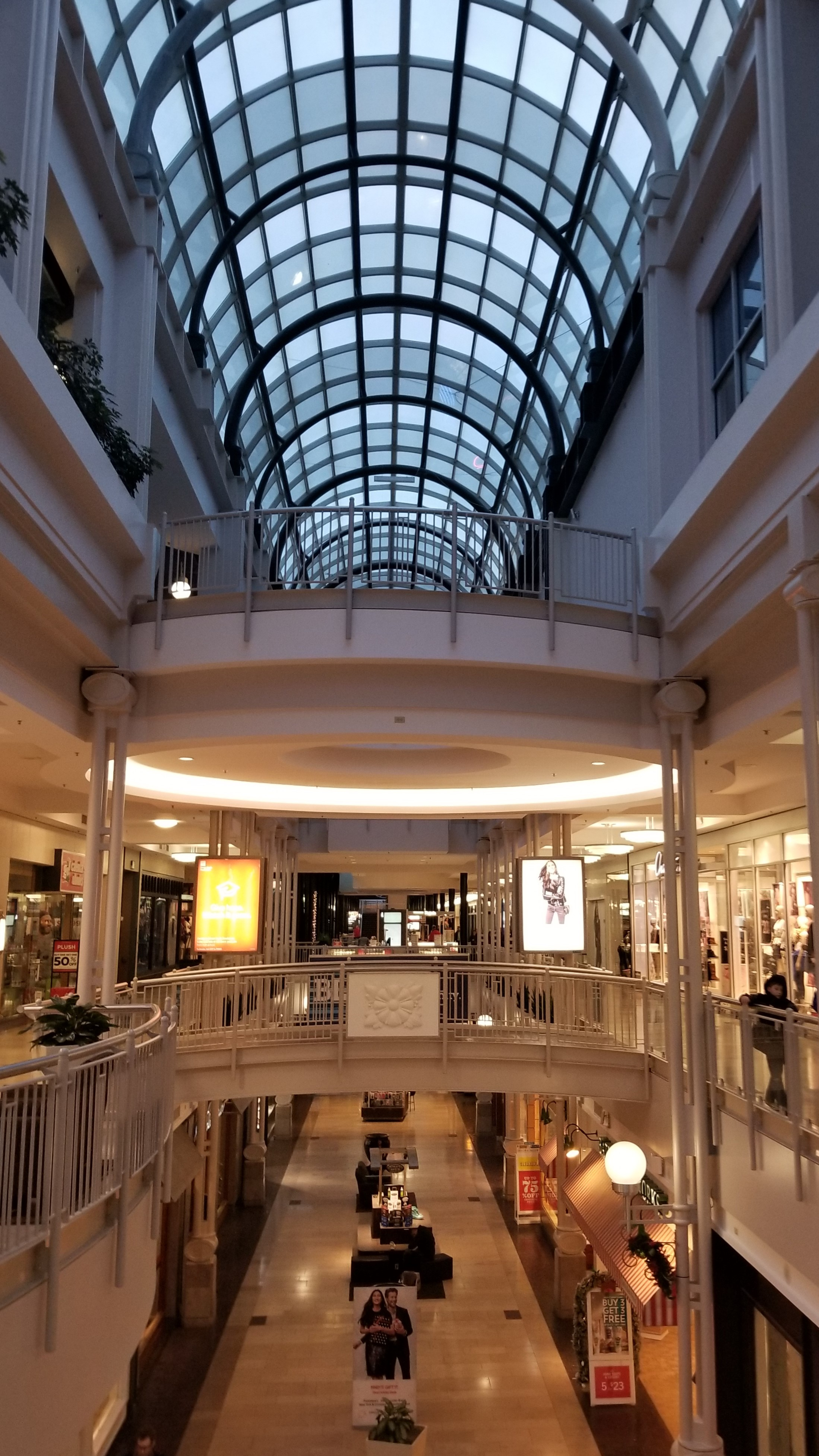
- Interior of Circle Centre Mall in 2018
- Location: Indianapolis, Indiana, United States
- Coordinates: 39°45′59″N 86°9′34″W
- Address: 49 W. Maryland St.
- Opened: September 8, 1995; 31 years ago
- Closed: December 31, 2025; 10 months ago
- Developer: Simon Property Group
- Manager: Hendricks Commercial Properties
- Owner: Hendricks Commercial Properties
- Architect: Ehrenkrantz & Eckstut Architects
- Num. of stores: 63
- Num. of anchor tenants: 4 (1 open, 3 vacant)
- Floor area: 729,981 square feet (67,817.5 m^{2})
- Floors: 4
- Parking: Metered street parking, parking garages (2 underground, 1 aboveground)
- Public transit: Julia M. Carson Transit Center (1,100 feet (335 m) east)
- Website: www.tractionyards.com

Circle Centre Mall was an indoor shopping mall located in Indianapolis, Indiana, United States. Circle Centre Mall was opened to the public on September 8, 1995, and incorporated existing downtown structures such as the former L. S. Ayres flagship store. The mall is only anchored by the offices for The Indianapolis Star. The space occupied by former anchors Carson Pirie Scott, Regal Cinemas, and Tilt Studio is vacant. The mall closed its doors on December 31, 2025.

The mall consisted of 99 stores on four levels with a gross leasable area of 729,981 square feet (67,817.5 m^{2}). When first conceived in the 1980s, it was intended to contain the existing Ayres and William H. Block department stores along with one or two others new to the city. Before the mall could open, both the Ayres and Block stores had closed, leaving Nordstrom and Parisian (later converted to Carson's) as anchors.

The third level featured a food court. The fourth level featured vacant entertainment venues (former Tilt Studio and a former nine-screen United Artists movie theater), but also now contains non-retail tenants.

The construction of the mall cost $307.5 million. Efforts were made in its design to incorporate historic elements, such as the retention of the facades of buildings that had previously existed on the site.

With the closure of Nordstrom in 2011 and that of Carson's on April 29, 2018, the mall had no department stores. In response to the changing retail conditions, the mall looked to non-traditional mall usages; in 2014, for example, The Indianapolis Star moved its offices into part of the space vacated by Nordstrom. On April 1, 2025, the south end of the mall closed to make way for redevelopment into a multi-use campus known as Traction Yards.

== Location and layout ==
Circle Centre covered approximately two square blocks in downtown Indianapolis, one block south of Monument Circle. It was bounded by Washington Street on the north, Meridian Street on the east, Georgia Street on the south, and Illinois Street on the west. Maryland Street splits the north block from the south block.

The mall covered 7.2 acres (2.9 ha), with a parking garage on the opposite side of Illinois Street covering 2.0 acres (0.81 ha) and connected by a sky bridge. Two underground parking garages underlay the mall itself. The mall contains 960,000 square feet (89,000 m^{2}) of space, of which 793,700 square feet (73,740 m^{2}) is leasable.

Circle Center was laid out in a "dumbbell" shape, with the two anchor stores at each end connected by a skylighted spine lined with stores. The ground level was split by Maryland Street, but the second, third, and fourth levels were joined by a wide sky bridge. On the first level, the anchors and a number of restaurants had entrances directly from the street. The fourth level contained the movie theater and other entertainment venues, but no other retailers.

The mall was connected on the south, west, and northwest to the Indianapolis skywalk network, connecting it directly to the Indiana Convention Center, Lucas Oil Stadium, and twelve hotels (including the Omni Severin Hotel, Le Méridien Indianapolis, Conrad Indianapolis, Embassy Suites, Hyatt Regency Indianapolis, Marriott Indianapolis, Westin, Crowne Plaza, and JW Marriott Indianapolis). The northwest connection led to the Artsgarden that is suspended over the intersection of Illinois and Washington streets.

== Planning and construction ==
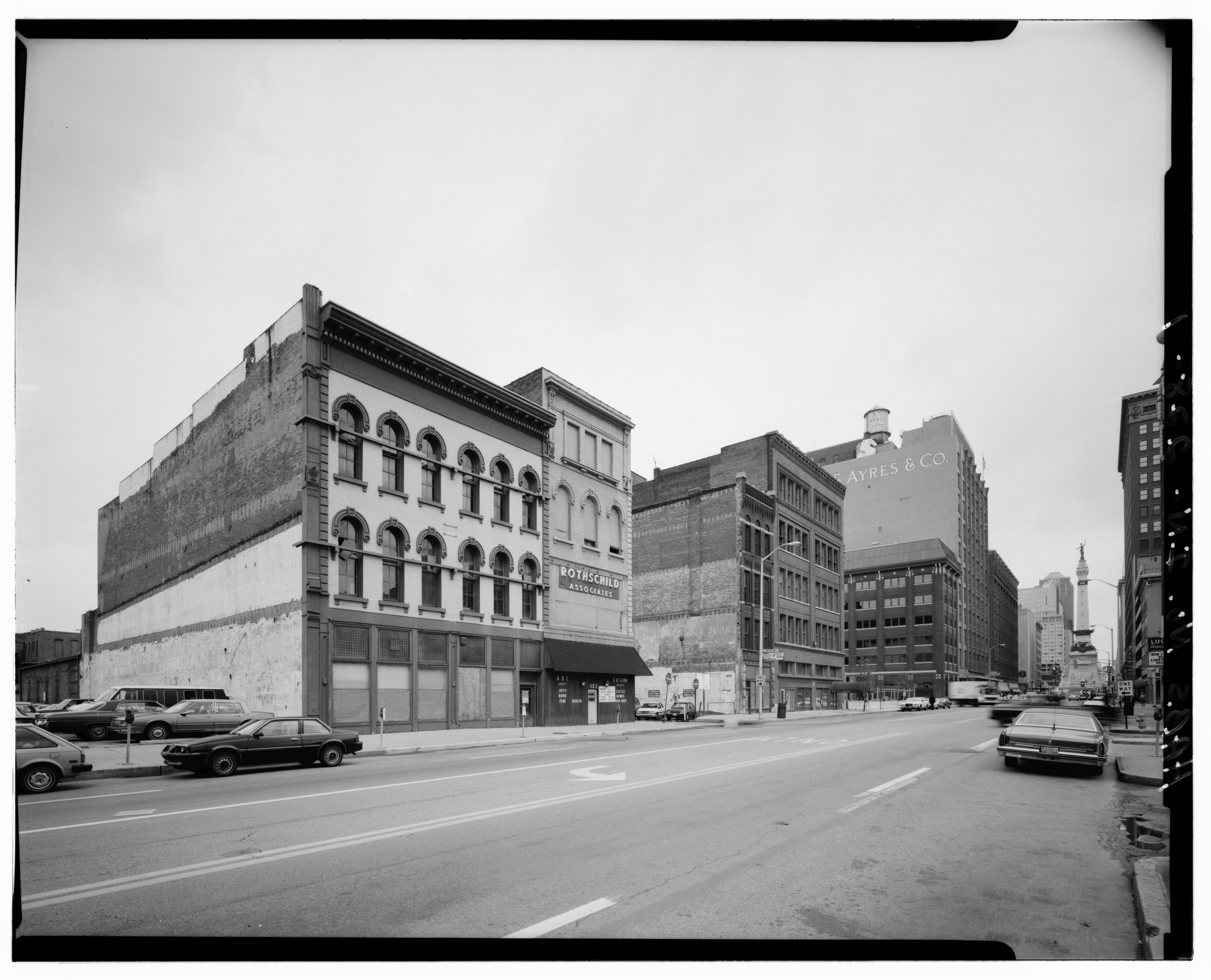
The façades (from left to right) of the House of Crane, Rothschild, and P. W. Jackson buildings in the 100-block of South Meridian Street were incorporated into the facade of the mall.

During the 1960s and 1970s, the downtown retail sector in Indianapolis was in decline as suburban shopping centers were opening. Vacancy rates were increasing and the physical environment was deteriorating. The lack of restaurants and other attractions led to fewer people coming downtown during the evening and on weekends. By the late 1970s, research as to the feasibility of a downtown covered mall had begun. In April 1979, Mayor William Hudnut and Melvin Simon & Associates announced the completion of a study that envisioned a two- or three-story mall between Meridian Street and Capitol Avenue. It would connect the L. S. Ayres store at Washington and Meridian streets and the William H. Block store at Illinois and Market streets, and could potentially include other department stores new to the city. The $100 million mall would be located north of Washington Street and have an entrance on the southwest quadrant of Monument Circle

Negotiations to purchase the real estate on the north side of Washington Street proved to be difficult. In particular, the Goodman family owned the Goodman Jewelers Building and several other buildings (including the Taylor Carpet Company Building and the Selig's Dry Goods Company Building) east of Illinois Street and, while the Goodmans wanted to be part of the mall, their valuation of their properties and their vision for the mall differed from those of the mall developers. As a result, the city decided to relocate the mall to the south side of Washington Street.

In 1983, the city began purchasing the needed property. The Occidental Building at the southeast corner of Washington and Illinois streets, which was the home of the L. Strauss & Co. clothing store, was bought for $2.8 million. Strauss moved to the new Claypool Courts at the northwest corner of the same intersection, but went out of business before the mall itself was completed. Purchase of the other needed parcels was completed by 1989.

The Jerde Partnership was engaged as the design architect in 1985. However, in 1991 they were replaced by Ehrenkrantz and Eckstut Architects.

By the end of 1990, most of the demolition of existing structures had been completed. However, Simon & Associates failed to meet a December 1 deadline to sign a permanent agreement because they had not been able to complete financing for the mall. Nevertheless, the city went ahead and awarded contracts for excavation of the underground garages and for retaining walls around the perimeter of the site.

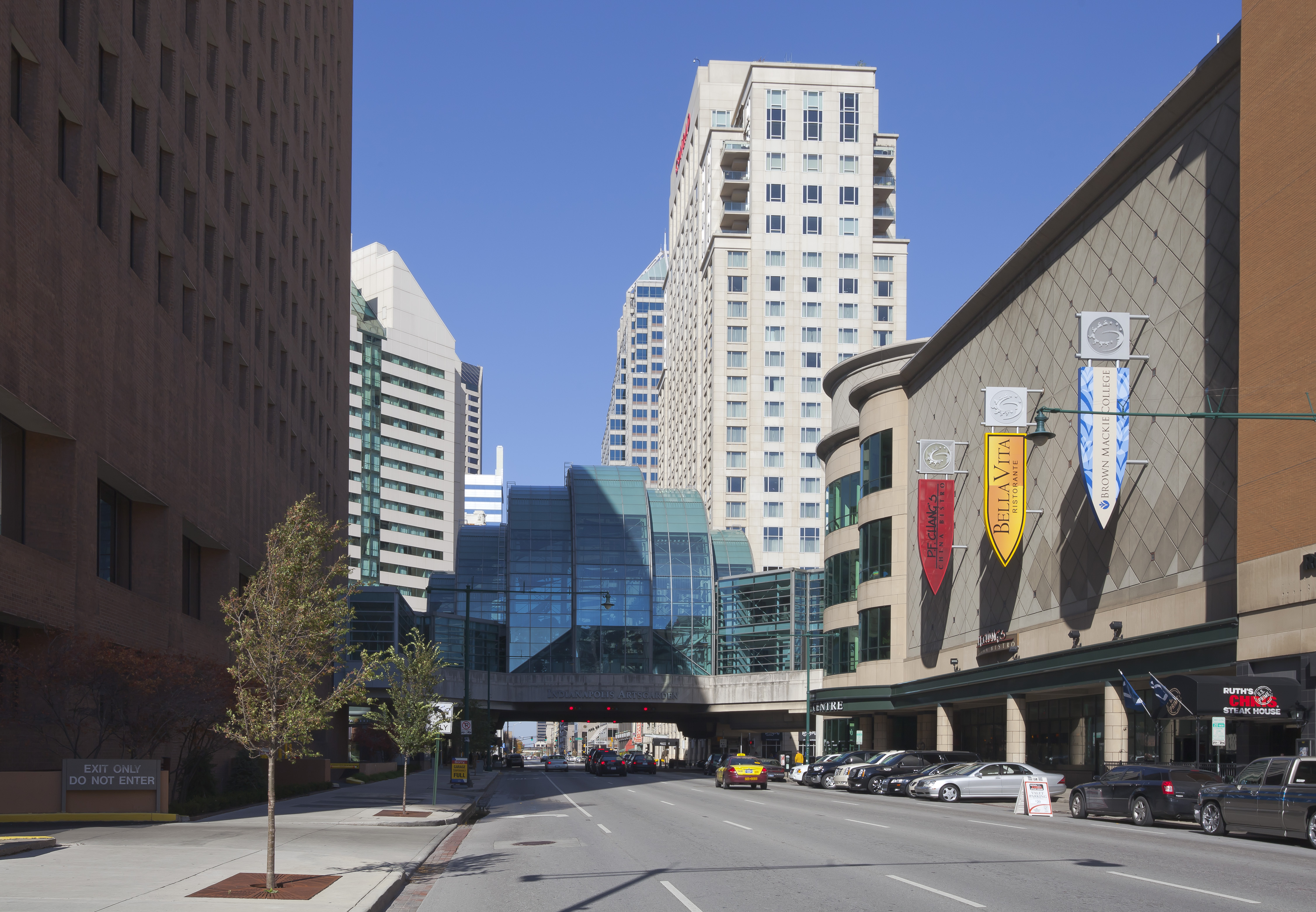
Looking north on Illinois Street at the Artsgarden with Circle Centre's western façade at right.

On September 17, 1991, a new plan and model for the mall, including what would become the Artsgarden, were presented. Eight days later, the city signed an agreement with Circle Centre Development Company, a consortium of twelve local companies, to provide $100 million in financing by March 1, 1992. A subsidiary of Simon & Associates served as the general partner. Delays in finalizing the financing subsequently led Mayor Stephen Goldsmith to declare a moratorium on further city participation. As a result of these problems, large portions of the mall site consisted of deep holes in the ground for over a year.

The original $100 million projected costs of the mall had risen as the scope changed and the timeline for completion of the mall grew. By March 1983 it was $125 million, growing to $400 million in December 1986 when 1 1/2 blocks were added to the project. It continued rising to $500 million in October 1987, $560 million in January 1988, and $650 million in March 1988. By June 1991 the projected cost had increased to $1 billion, but in that month it decreased to between $500 million and $750 million. However, by November 1994, about a year before the grand opening, the cost was expected to be only $325 million.

Circle Centre officially opened on September 8, 1995, at a total cost of $307.5 million (not including the $12 million for the Artsgarden). Of that total, $55.0 million was for site acquisition, $10.3 million for site improvement, $62.2 million for mall construction, $27.4 million for a parking structure, $124.0 million for tenant improvements, and $28.6 million for soft costs. The financing consisted of $187 million by the City of Indianapolis (including federal grants), $75 million by the equity partners (Circle Centre Development Partners), and $45 million from construction loans.

=== Renovation ===
In February 2018, the Simon Property Group announced a multimillion-dollar renovation for Circle Centre, its largest ever, that would be worked on over the next two years. The project includes improvements to bathrooms, flooring, lighting, elevators, and entrances. The third-floor food court will have new lounge areas, banquette seating, and community tables to attract more restaurant patrons. When asked about the outlook for Circle Centre in view of the loss of its remaining anchor store and of smaller retailers, the mall's general manager said that she envisioned the mall becoming a hybrid of traditional and non-traditional retail. In 2015, a proposal had been put forth to add residential units, but that is not part of the current project. The project also does not address what would be done with the space occupied by Carson's.

On April 1, 2021, day-to-day management of the mall was taken over by JLL. Simon continued to handle leasing, until they sold their remaining stake in December 2021 to the Circle Centre Development Company.

In December 2023, the Circle Centre Development Company announced that it had reached an agreement to sell the mall to Hendricks Commercial Properties. Hendricks had previously redeveloped the other public spaces in Indiana plans to spend about $600 million over the next ten years to redevelop the mall into an “open air, pedestrian-focused campus with housing, offices and shopping”. The acquisition was completed on April 24, 2024. The mall closed permanently on December 31, 2025, to allow the redevelopment to begin. The first phase, which is targeted to open in 2029, will include 400,000 square feet (37,000 m^{2}) of retail, dining, and entertainment; 100,000 square feet (9,300 m^{2}) of office space, and more than 300 apartments, along with public plazas and green spaces. Restaurants and other businesses that face the streets will continue to operate during the redevelopment. The campus will be known as Traction Yards.

== Historic preservation ==
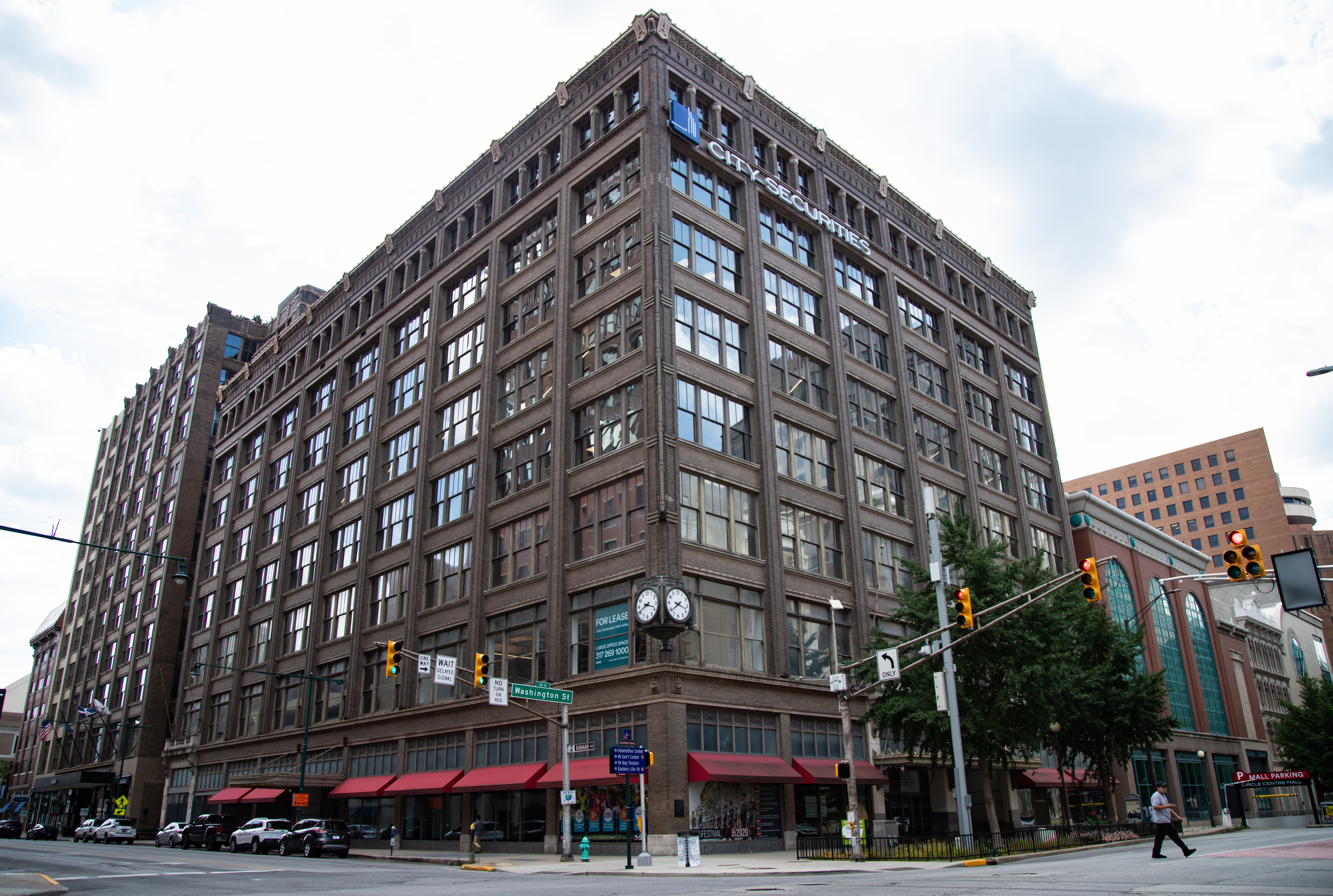
L. S. Ayres flagship department store building, completed in 1905

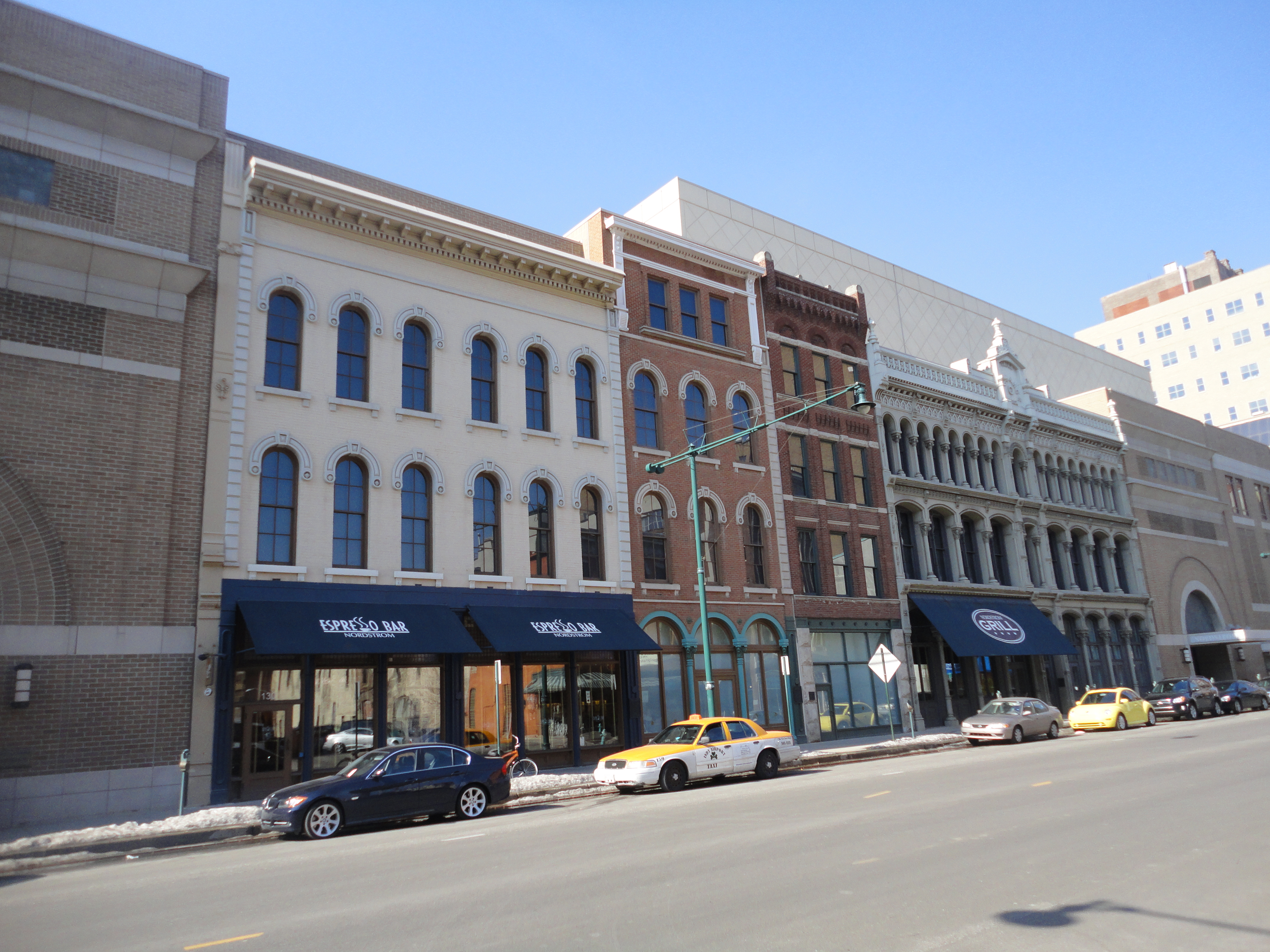
Historic façades integrated into the mall's Meridian Street frontage

Since some of the costs of the mall were paid by federal funding, a survey of the buildings in the redevelopment area was conducted as to their historical importance under Section 106 of the National Historic Preservation Act of 1966. The survey was conducted between 1987 and 1990.

Of the 43 buildings surveyed, it was decided that 17 would be retained, 8 would have only their facades preserved, and 18 would be demolished. Fourteen of the buildings to be demolished were contributing structures in the Wholesale District, a historic district on the National Register of Historic Places. The facades of seven buildings were subsequently incorporated into the exterior of the mall.

Of the seven historic facades that were preserved, only two were used in place. The others were moved as much as two blocks from their original locations. The cast-iron façade of the Vajen Exchange Block Building, which had been preserved by the Historic Landmarks Foundation from an earlier demolition outside the Wholesale District, was also used.

- J. F. Darmody Company Building, built in 1904, moved from 25–27 W. Maryland Street to 119 S. Illinois Street
- Griffith Building, built in 1872, moved from 36–38 W. Washington Street to 49 W. Washington Street
- House of Crane Building, built in 1866–1867, reconstructed at its original location of 124 S. Meridian Street
- Levey Brothers and Company Building, built in 1889–1890, moved from 15 W. Maryland Street to 13 W. Maryland Street
- P. W. Jackson Building, (also known as the Malott Building), built in 1896, moved from 118 S. Meridian Street to 120 S. Meridian Street
- Rost Jewelry Company Building, built in 1887 and remodeled in 1936 and 1948, moved from 25 N. Illinois Street to 153 S. Illinois Street
- Rothschild Building, built in 1866–1867, reconstructed at its original location of 122 S. Meridian Street
- Vajen Exchange Block Building, built in 1872, relocated from 120 N. Pennsylvania Street to 116 S. Meridian Street

Some of the buildings that were retained, including the L. S. Ayres building, were incorporated directly into the mall. Others, such as the Canterbury Hotel and the St. Elmo building, remained privately owned and the mall was constructed around them. In addition, portions of the interiors of certain buildings were used as interior design elements, an example being the Expresso Bar in Nordstrom. The first floor of the L. S. Ayres main building was also historically restored rather than being stripped out as was initially proposed.

== Anchor stores ==
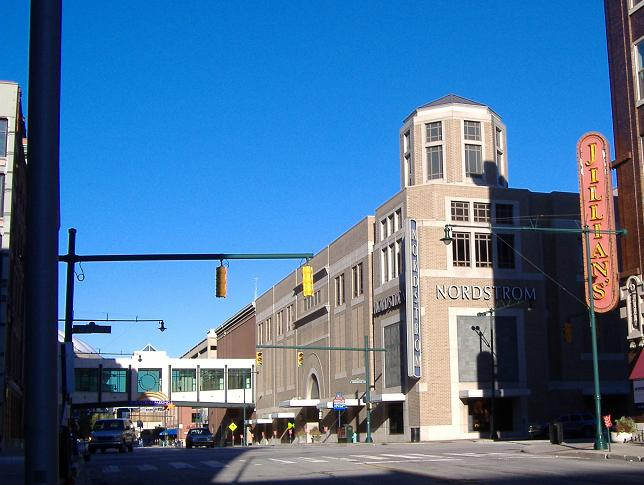
Circle Centre Nordstrom at Georgia and Meridian streets in 2006

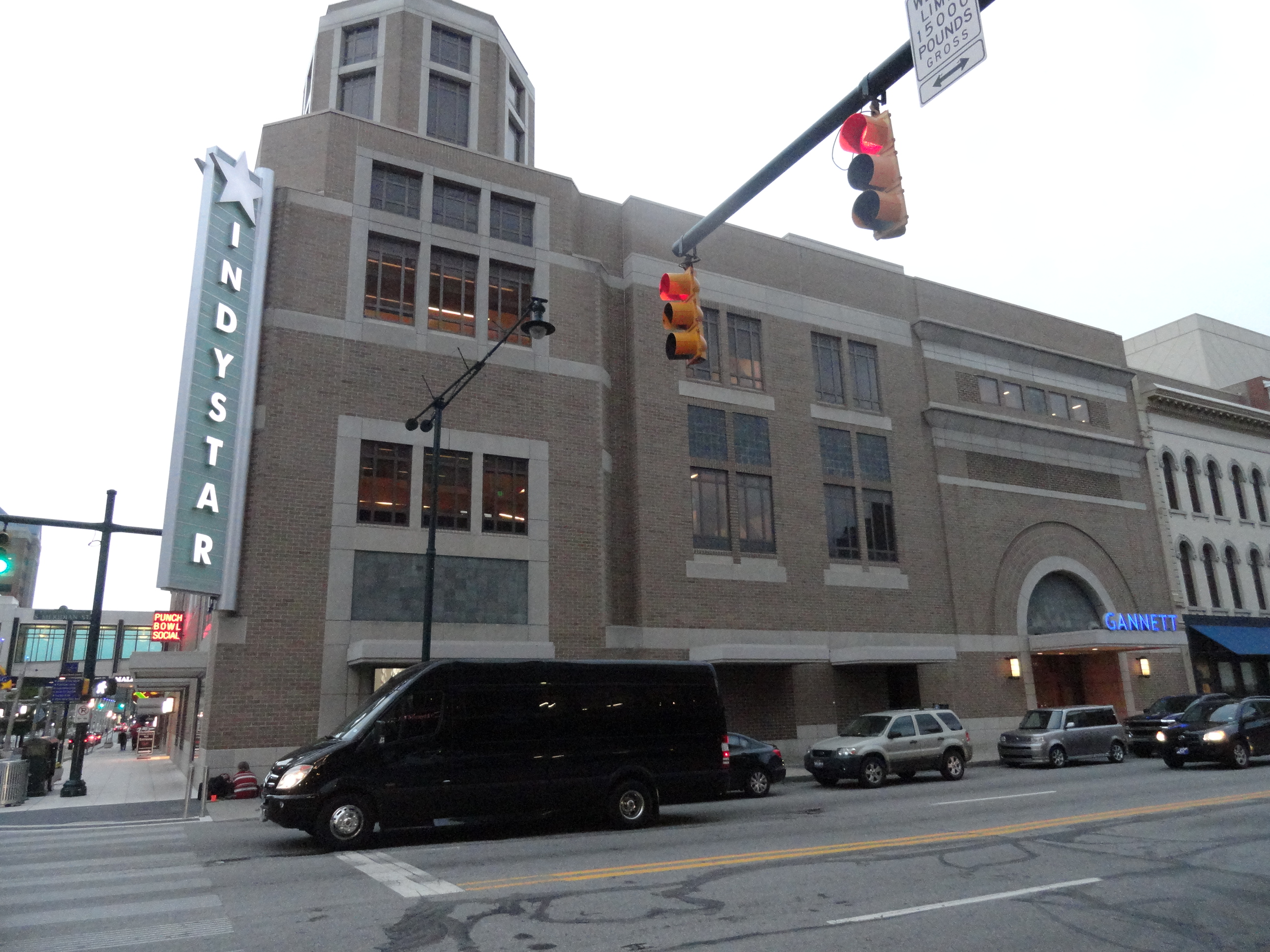
The Indianapolis Star began leasing space in the former Nordstrom space in 2014

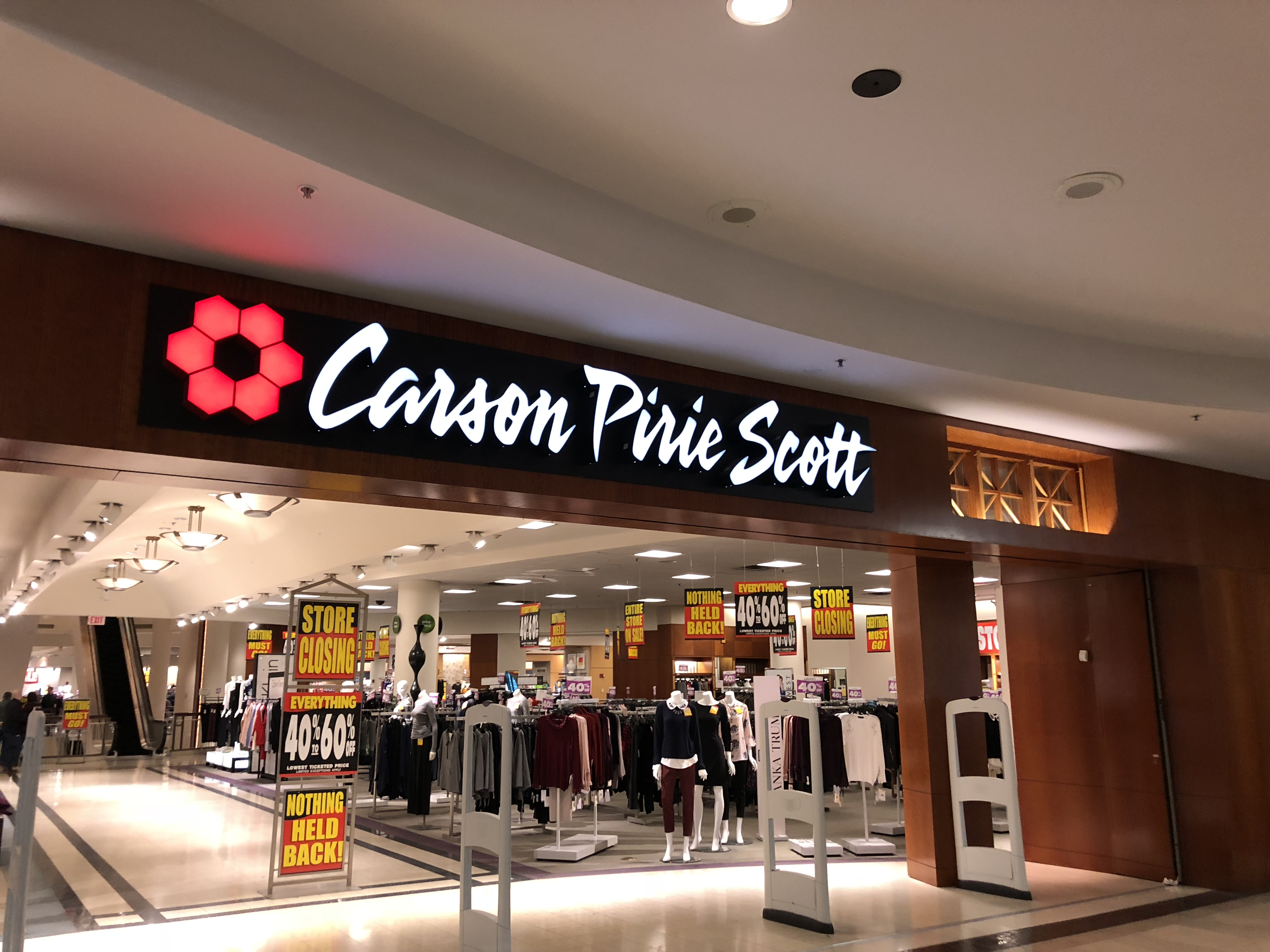
Second-floor mall entrance of Carson's shown with "STORE CLOSING" signs in February 2018

In the original concept, the mall would have connected the existing downtown locations of the L. S. Ayres and the William H. Block department stores and added one or more department stores that did not then have locations in Indianapolis. In January 1988, Saks Fifth Avenue announced that it would build a new 90,000-square-foot (8,400 m^{2}) store on the northeast corner of Washington and Illinois streets. However, in July 1990, amid a financial downturn, the new owners of Saks stated that no new stores, including the proposed Indianapolis one, would be built during the new three years.

In April 1989, Nordstrom announced that it would become Circle Centre's fourth anchor store. Initial plans had been to locate the fourth anchor in the Occidental Building at the southeast corner of Washington and Illinois streets. Nordstrom proposed a 200,000-square-foot (19,000 m^{2}) three-story structure, which was larger than the planned site could accommodate, so Nordstrom was located in a new building on Meridian Street between Georgia and Maryland streets.

Block's department store changed its name to Lazarus in 1988, having been purchased by the latter the previous year. At the end of January 1993, Lazarus closed the downtown store, having announced their intent the previous June. Updated plans for the mall had shown Lazarus occupying a new building on the southwest quadrant of Monument Circle. Although Lazarus stated it was still open to being part of the mall, ultimately it did not.

On April 4, 1991, the May Department Stores announced that its L. S. Ayres subsidiary would not be part of Circle Centre, with the downtown location closing in the spring of 1992. In June of that year, Parisian announced that it would open a store in Circle Centre, using the first three levels of the Ayres building. As a result, Circle Centre had two anchor stores when it opened in 1995: Nordstrom and Parisian.

In July 2011, Nordstrom closed its Circle Centre store due to decreased sales as many of its customers began shopping at its newer store in The Fashion Mall at Keystone, which had opened in 2008. The mall was unable to attract another anchor store for the location after three years of effort, so an agreement was reached with The Indianapolis Star to move its newspaper offices into 100,000 square feet (9,300 m^{2}) of the upper levels of the former Nordstrom space. The move was completed on September 29, 2014.

In 2007, the name of the Parisian store was changed to Carson Pirie Scott after having been sold to The Bon-Ton Stores in 2006; the name was later shortened to just Carson's. In December 2014, the city agreed to reduce the rent on the location by $300,000 annually through January 2018. On January 31, 2018, Bon-Ton announced that it would be closing the store (along with 46 of its other locations) in ten to twelve weeks, leaving the mall with no anchors. Carson's closed permanently at the end of the normal business hours on Sunday, April 29, 2018.

The Regal Cinemas held its final showtimes at the mall and closed on October 31, 2024, and Tilt Studio closed on November 20, 2024, leaving the mall without traditional anchors.

== Tenants ==
When Circle Centre opened in September 1995, it had two anchor stores—Nordstrom, with 206,000 square feet (19,100 m^{2}), and Parisian, with 144,000 square feet (13,400 m^{2})—and 88 other stores with a total of 418,000 square feet (38,800 m^{2}). Of those 88, 22 were restaurants and food service, 30 were clothing and shoe stores, and 7 were recreational (including movie theaters).

As of February 2018, there were 90 stores besides the Carson's anchor. Of those, 26 were restaurants, 58 were retail stores, and 6 were entertainment venues. In addition, substantial amounts of space are now used by non-retail establishments: The Indianapolis Star uses 100,000 square feet (9,300 m^{2}) of the former Nordstrom space, and Brown Mackie College, which moved-in in 2011, takes up about 25,000 square feet (2,300 m^{2}) on the fourth level; however, in 2016 the school announced that it would not accept any new students as it shut down its operations. The Simon Youth Academy, an Indianapolis Public Schools Choice School for 11th and 12th graders that opened in 2015, also occupies about 5,000 square feet (460 m^{2}) on the fourth floor.

== See also ==
- Economy of Indianapolis
- List of shopping malls in the United States
