= H. James Litten =

American real estate broker

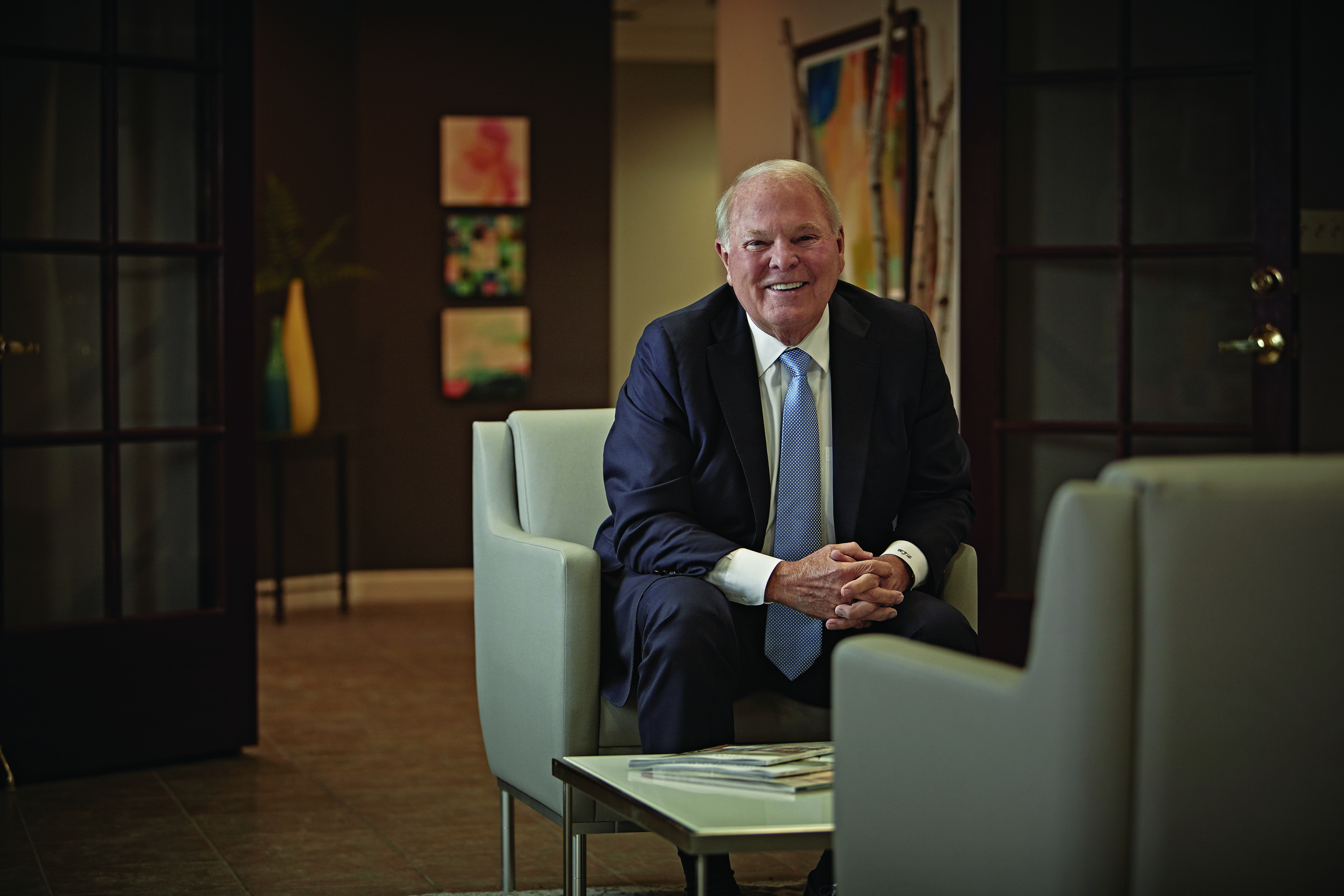
- Litten in 2022
- Born: Dayton, Ohio
- Education: Ohio University
- Occupations: Businessman; Real estate broker
- Known for: President of F.C. Tucker Company
- Website: Official Company Website

H. James "Jim" Litten is an American business executive and real estate broker who is the current president of the F.C. Tucker Company in Indianapolis, Indiana. He is the only chief executive in the company's 97-year history to not be in the Tucker family. In 2005, the Metropolitan Indianapolis Board of Realtors named Litten the "Distinguished Realtor of the Year."

== Early life and education ==
Litten was born in Dayton, Ohio and grew up in Martins Ferry, Ohio on the Ohio River. His father was a salesman for an oil company. Litten's first job came at age 15 and involved delivering groceries for a grocery store in Bridgeport, Ohio. Litten went to Ohio University on a football scholarship where he studied physical education. After graduating from college in 1966, his intent was to become a football coach. In 1969 and 1970 he spent a tour of duty in Vietnam as a company commander in an Army postal unit. He earned a Bronze Star for his service and achieved the rank of lieutenant.

== Career ==
Litten began his career in real estate in 1972 as a residential sales associate at the F.C. Tucker Company. After working through the ranks of the company, Litten became co-owner in 1986 (along with Fred C. Tucker III and David Goodrich) after Fred C. "Bud" Tucker Jr. retired. Litten also became the president of the company's residential real estate services division. Under Litten and Tucker III's tenure, the company maintained an increased focus on residential real estate. They oversaw the 1998 sale of the commercial division of F.C. Tucker to Colliers Turley Martin, a commercial real estate firm based in St. Louis.

Even so, F.C. Tucker remained Indiana's largest independent real estate brokerage. In 2001, the company had more than $2.1 billion in sales revenue. A survey by REAL Trends named F.C. Tucker the 12th-largest regional brand in the nation. The Metropolitan Indianapolis Board of Realtors called Litten the "Distinguished Realtor of the Year" in 2005. In 2010, Fred C. Tucker III retired, and Litten bought out his stake in the company, becoming sole owner and president of F.C. Tucker and all eight of its divisions. As co-owners, Tucker III and Litten helped increase annual revenue from $300 million in 1986 to $2.2 billion in 2009. Litten remains president of the company as of 2015. In 2013, Litten was named to the Swanepoel Power 200 list as one of the most powerful people in real estate, and as of 2015 the company has grown to 1,500 agents with $3.2 billion in sales.

== Personal life ==
Litten has a wife, Tami, along with four children: Penny, Amy, Jill, and A.J.
