= J. Michael Durnil =

American activist

- Born: John Michael Durnil; July 21, 1961 (age 65); Decatur, Illinois, U.S.
- Education: Illinois State University (BA, MS) Loyola University Chicago (PhD) Harvard University (Post-Doctoral Certificate, 2003)
- Occupations: President and CEO, Simon Youth Foundation
- Children: 2

John Michael Durnil served as the executive director of the Scripps National Spelling Bee from March 2021 until his retirement in November 2022. From December 2010 to February 2021, he was president and CEO of the Simon Youth Foundation (SYF). Durnil is the former Senior Vice President and Interim President of the Gay & Lesbian Alliance Against Defamation (GLAAD), and the former Executive Vice President for Governmental Affairs & University Outreach and Assistant Secretary to the board of trustees at Roosevelt University in Chicago, Illinois. He has been nationally recognized for his service in the field of higher education and for his advocacy of LGBT rights. Durnil serves on the executive board of the American Council on Education Council of Fellows. Durnil is also an ordained Elder in the Presbyterian Church and a member of the International Order of DeMolay.

Durnil currently lives in Cincinnati, Ohio. He has two adult children, Lauren Durnil and J. Andrew Durnil, His son, J. Andrew Durnil, is a professional artist and creates under the pen name Andrew Gouwen. Durnil married Lynn Burnside Smith II on 25 November 2015 in a private ceremony in New York City's Bethesda Terrace Arcade.

== Early life and education ==
Durnil was born in Decatur, Illinois to D. Dean Durnil, a sheet metal worker, and Patricia Lawler Durnil. From 1975 to 1979, he attended Eisenhower High School where he showed an interest in biological sciences. A first-generation college student, Durnil graduated from Illinois State University (ISU) in 1983 with a bachelor's degree in biology. Influenced by his experiences in student government, residence life, and admissions activities at ISU, Durnil graduated a year later with his Master's of Sciences from ISU's Educational Administration and Foundations graduate program.

In 1991, Durnil was admitted to Loyola University Chicago to pursue his Ph.D. in higher education. Inspired by his professional work on HIV/AIDS, Durnil completed his doctorate 18 months later, successfully defending his dissertation entitled, "More than red ribbons: Student affairs professionals who advocate for HIV/AIDS issues in higher education." He continued on to Harvard University and completed his post-doctorate certificate in Educational Management in 2003. In 2004, Durnil was selected as a Fellow of the American Council on Education; spending his residency year at Fairleigh Dickinson University in New Jersey, and working with the United Nations Ambassador Corp.

== Professional career in higher education ==
Dr. Durnil's career includes over 27 years of experience in higher education and community activism, with 15 years at Roosevelt and eight years working directly with the President and board governance. Dr. Durnil served as vice president for Governmental Affairs & University Outreach and Assistant Secretary to the board of trustees at Roosevelt University in Chicago Ill. While there, he was responsible for the creation, direction, and implementation of strategic activities with institutional image, communications, public relations, governmental agencies, professional associations, civic organizations and all other aspects of governmental and external relations for the university. He managed the overall operation and coordination of the activities of the 80-member board of trustees. From 2003 to 2005, Dr. Durnil served as vice president for Administration and Assistant Secretary to the Board where he oversaw the overall direction and operation of the Office of the President, while also coordinating the activities of the 80-member board of trustees. As Campus President and Executive Officer for the university's Albert A. Robin Campus in suburban Schaumburg from 2000 to 2003, Dr. Durnil directed the operations of the 3,200-student campus and developed and strengthened the overall university presence in the northwest suburbs. He also constructed a campus master plan that detailed a ten-year strategic plan for the campus.

He has served on many municipal and civic boards, including being an inaugural Commissioner for the Arts in Arlington Heights, Illinois and as Commissioner for the Schaumburg Development Commission. He began at Roosevelt as the Dean of Student Life, and was soon promoted to Assistant Vice Provost for Student Affairs and then Associate Vice President for Student Services several years later.

== LGBT and GLAAD ==
In 2002, Roosevelt University appointed Chuck Middleton as president. Middleton was the first openly gay President of any major national college or university. Working with Durnil, Middleton used this position to forward the university's agenda on social justice. In 2006, Roosevelt University assisted with the logistics and provided space for the Gay Games VII.

In 2008, Durnil was recruited by then-President Neil Giuliano to become the Senior Vice President of GLAAD. GLAAD is dedicated to promoting and ensuring fair, accurate and inclusive representation of people and events in the media as a means of eliminating homophobia and discrimination based on gender identity and sexual orientation. GLAAD advocates for full equality for the lesbian, gay, bisexual and transgender (LGBT) community in television and news outlets. In this senior leadership position, Dr. Durnil provided strategic guidance, direction and implementation oversight as GLAAD continued to advance, grow and expand as national media advocacy and anti-defamation organization. Durnil was responsible for the coordination and implementation of GLAAD's strategic plan, which included a major re-brand and communications effort while fulfilling the roles of the COO position in the LA and NYC offices. As Interim President for several months of 2009, Durnil successfully directed GLAAD through the leadership transition from Giuliano to Jarrett Barrios. Durnil stepped down from all of his positions at GLAAD on June 30, 2010.

== Simon Youth Foundation ==
On December 13, 2010, the Simon Youth Foundation (SYF) announced that its new CEO would be Durnil. Following the announcement, Durnil moved to Indianapolis and assumed his leadership role.

Durnil was appointed as president and CEO of the Simon Youth Foundation, a public charity associated with the Simon Property Group, the first REIT to be listed on S&P 100, in December 2010. Simon Youth Foundation ignites hope through educational opportunities for students who are at risk of dropping out of high school through two major initiatives: Simon Youth Academies and Simon Youth Scholarships. In partnership with local public school districts, SYF supports 45 Simon Youth Academies in 15 states. Primarily located in Simon malls, Simon Youth Academies offer flexible schedules and small class sizes that make learning accessible to students who struggle to connect with material in a traditional classroom or school because they are homeless, bullied, battling serious illness, facing parenthood, working full-time to support their families, or facing other challenging personal circumstances. The overall graduation rate for Simon Youth Academy students is 90%. During 2019, SYF celebrated the Foundation's 20th anniversary and 20,000th-lifetime graduate. In honor of this milestone, the Foundation awarded a four-year scholarship valued at $32,000 to the 20,000th graduate, and also awarded a $20,000 grant to her Simon Youth Academy.

== Community activism and volunteer work ==
Durnil has served on national and regional boards and committees in a variety of higher education and community associations, including the American Council on Education, the Association of Governing Boards and the Association of American Colleges and Universities. In 2006, Durnil was Roosevelt University's institutional representative for Gay Games VII, held in Chicago and attracted over 14,000 participants from all over the world.

Durnil has volunteered with organizations such as the American Red Cross, the Human Rights Campaign, the Illinois Ethnic Coalition, and most recently as a volunteer with the Super Bowl XLVI Host Committee in Indianapolis. Durnil was on a team of Illinois educators who wrote the original state protocols for university policies on HIV/AIDS in the early 1990s and served as the inaugural chair of the American Red Cross HIV/AIDS peer trainer task force for the Mid-America Chapter in Chicago.

== Awards and recognition ==
In 2008, Durnil was recognized by both the city of Chicago and by the Governor of the State of Illinois for his service to higher education. That same year, the 110th Congress of the United States bestowed upon Durnil Congressional Recognition, presented by the Hon. Danny K. Davis. In 2010, his doctoral alma mater, Loyola University Chicago, recognized Durnil with the "Distinguished Alumni Award" and in 2017 he was inducted into the Illinois State University alumni Hall of Fame. Durnil was similarly recognized by his K-12 school system, Decatur (IL) Public School District #61 in 2005 as an outstanding alum.

Durnil is an ordained Elder in the Presbyterian Church, USA, and a member of the International Order of DeMolay.

Durnil has won several award ribbons in the Culinary Arts at the Indiana State Fair with his award-winning recipes published in the 2017, 2018 and 2019 Fair Cookbooks.

== Personal life ==
Durnil's husband is Lynn Smith II, owner of a general building contractor in Indianapolis. The two were married in 2015.

== See also ==
- GLAAD
- Roosevelt University
