= St. Elmo Steak House =

Restaurant in Indianapolis, Indiana, US

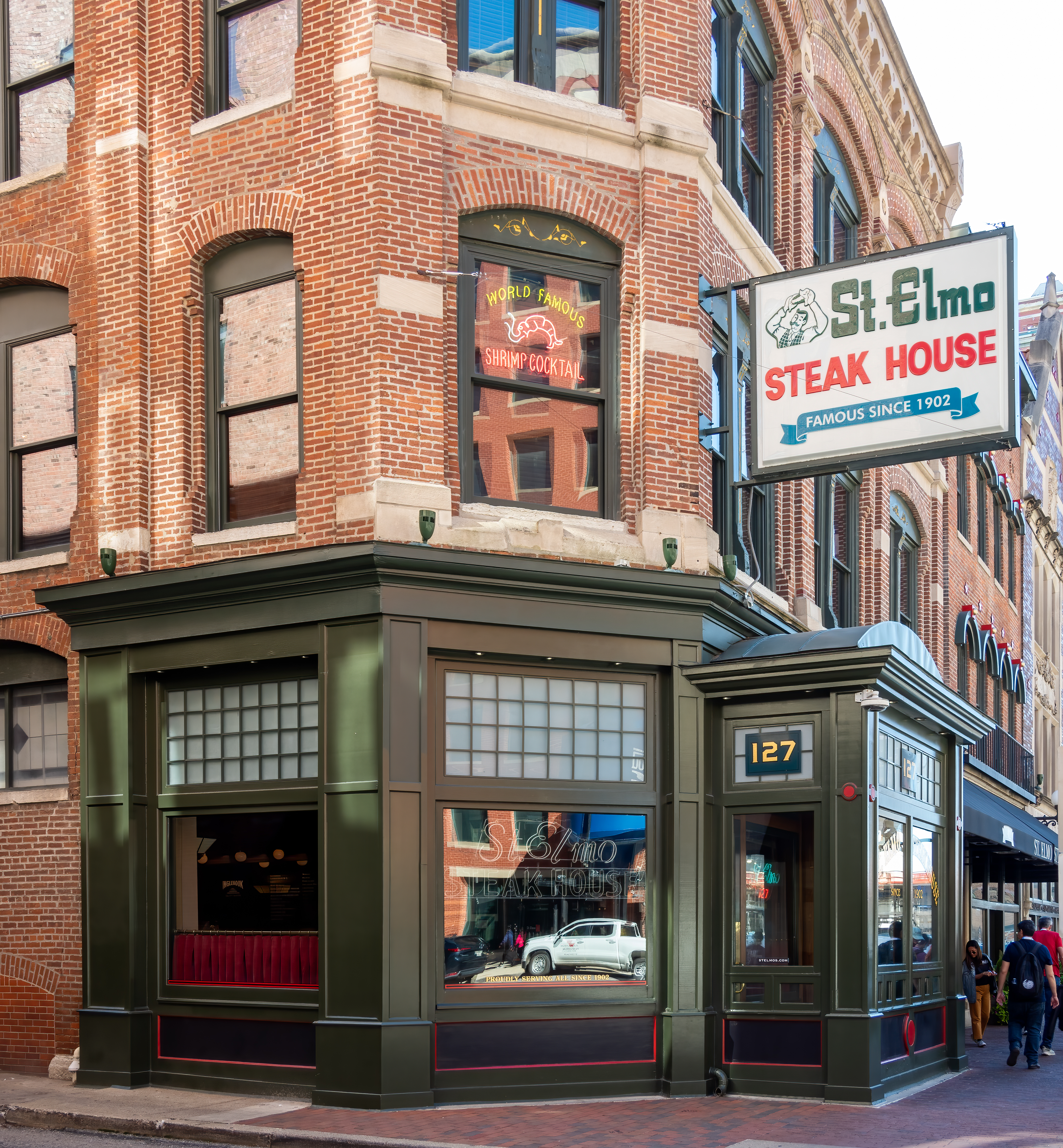
- St. Elmo Steak House in 2024
- Interactive map of St. Elmo Steak House

Restaurant information
- Established: October 1902; 124 years ago
- Owners: Steve and Craig Huse (Huse Culinary)
- Previous owners: Harry Roth and Isadore "Izzy" Rosen
- Head chef: Matthew Wahl
- Food type: Steak and seafood
- Dress code: None
- Location: 127 S. Illinois St., Indianapolis, Marion, Indiana, 46225, U.S.
- Coordinates: 39.764817°N 86.159645°W
- Seating capacity: 455
- Website: stelmos.com

St. Elmo Steak House is a restaurant in the Wholesale District of Indianapolis, Indiana, United States. Founded in 1902, it is the oldest steakhouse in Indianapolis. Its specialty shrimp cocktail has earned wide recognition in the American culinary scene. In 2020, it was among the 25 highest-grossing independent restaurants in the U.S. with annual sales exceeding $21 million.

== History ==
St. Elmo opened at the Braden's Block, or the Braden Building, in the Wholesale District of downtown Indianapolis in 1902. Founder Joe Stahr named the restaurant after Erasmus of Formia (or St. Elmo), patron saint of sailors. In 1947, Stahr sold the business to local tavern operator Burt Condon. Condon's ownership was brief, selling the restaurant six months later to brothers Harry, Sam, and Ike Roth in 1948.

In 1956, Sam and Ike Roth left the business to their brother, Harry, and new partner, Isadore "Izzy" Rosen. Roth and Rosen co-owned the establishment until 1986 when St. Elmo was sold to local entrepreneurs Stephen "Steve" Huse (founder of Noble Roman's) and Jeff Dunaway for US$2.5 million. Steve Huse's son, Craig Huse, joined as a minority-owner in 1997 and operates the restaurant. In 1998, Dunaway sold his 49-percent stake in ownership.

A US$2 million renovation in 1997 refreshed the wine cellar, kitchen, and two dining rooms. In commemoration of the restaurant's 100th anniversary in 2002, exterior renovations were undertaken, including the installation of an awning, façade lighting, and decorative brick pavers. In 2011, renovations to the restaurant's second floor converted 3,000 square feet (280 m^{2}) into a bar, 1933 Lounge—a homage to the year prohibition ended.

Since 2013, St. Elmo has partnered with the Indiana Sports Corp and Major League Eating to host an annual competitive eating event. Joey Chestnut has remained undefeated since the inaugural competition and holds the world record for consuming 18 lb 9.6 oz (8.44 kg) of the restaurant's shrimp cocktail in eight minutes at the 2018 contest.

St. Elmo Foods LLC was established in 2018 to oversee the restaurant's portfolio of retail products, including cocktail sauce, steak sauce, seasoning, horseradish, salad dressing, bourbon whiskey, and hard soda.

In November 2025, Huse Culinary was sued by Perry Tole, a man who was attacked by Fox Sports color commentator and former NFL quarterback Mark Sanchez, with Tole's lawsuit seeking damages under the state's dram shop act for St. Elmo overserving Sanchez drinks, and later attacking Tole in a nearby alley while he was filling his truck with used cooking oil, forcing Tole to stab Sanchez in self defense under duress.

=== Building and site ===
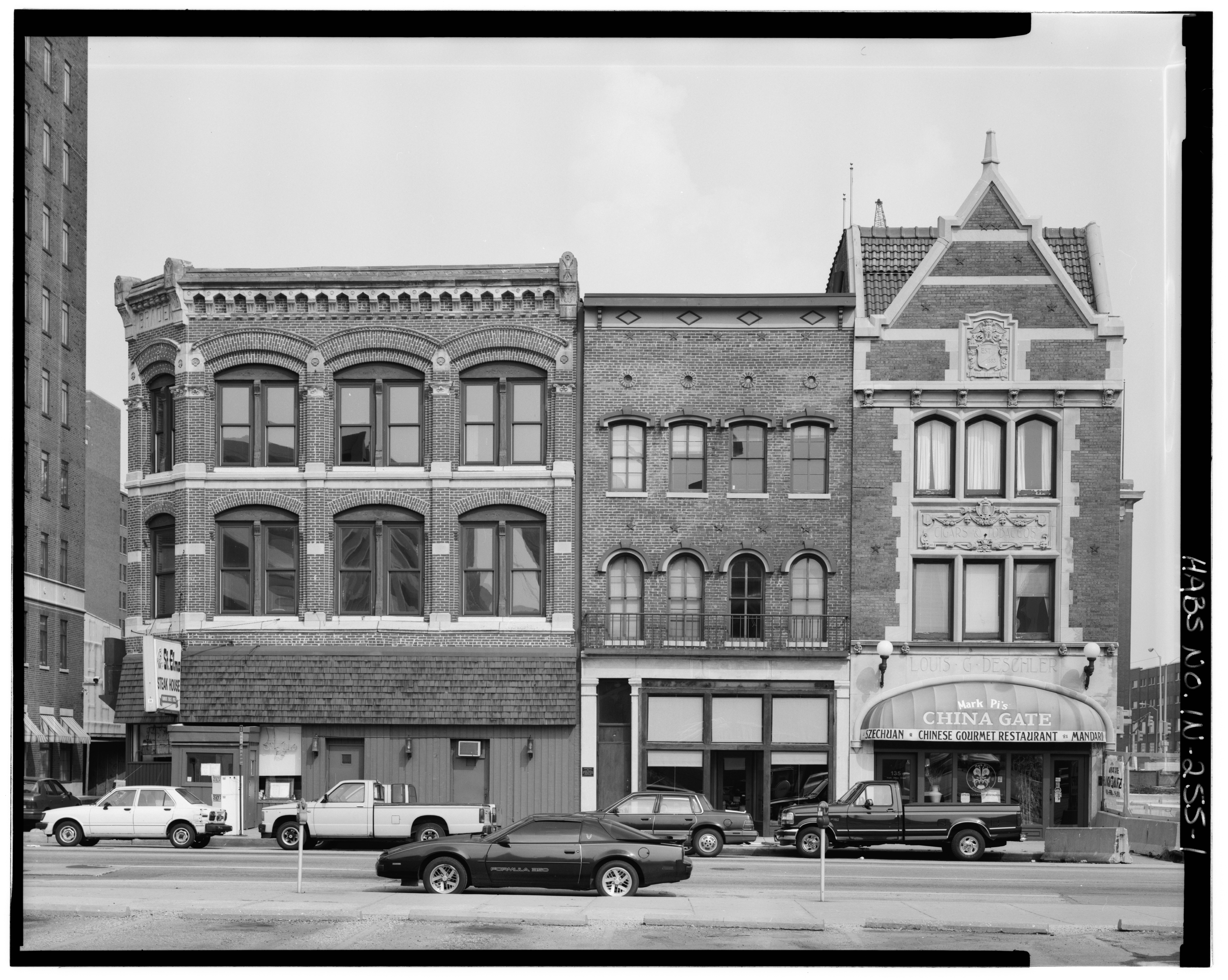
Left to right: Braden's Block, Reinhardt, and Louis G. Deschler Company buildings, c. 1990

Since its establishment in 1902, St. Elmo has been located in the Braden's Block building. Initially, the business occupied a small footprint on the building's ground-floor (the current front room and bar). Beginning in the 1970s, St. Elmo expanded into the neighboring Reinhardt and Louis G. Deschler Company buildings to the south. Despite extensive interior modifications, each building has maintained its unique historic façade.

Completed in 1875, Braden's Block (127–131 S. Illinois St.) is distinctive for its beveled northwestern bay and ornamental stone cornice. The Braden's façade was extensively rehabilitated in 2016. The Italianate-style Reinhardt Building (133 S. Illinois St.) is notable as the oldest surviving building on Illinois St. in the Mile Square, completed in 1864. The Louis G. Deschler Company Building (135 S. Illinois St.) was built in the German Renaissance Revival-style in 1907. The three buildings are faced with brick and number three stories. They are contributing structures to the Indianapolis Union Station-Wholesale District, listed on the National Register of Historic Places since 1982.

Le Méridien Indianapolis Hotel is sited immediately north of St. Elmo, across a small service drive (formerly W. Chesapeake St.). Completed in 1995, Circle Centre Mall was constructed on the east and south sides of the three buildings.

== Cuisine ==
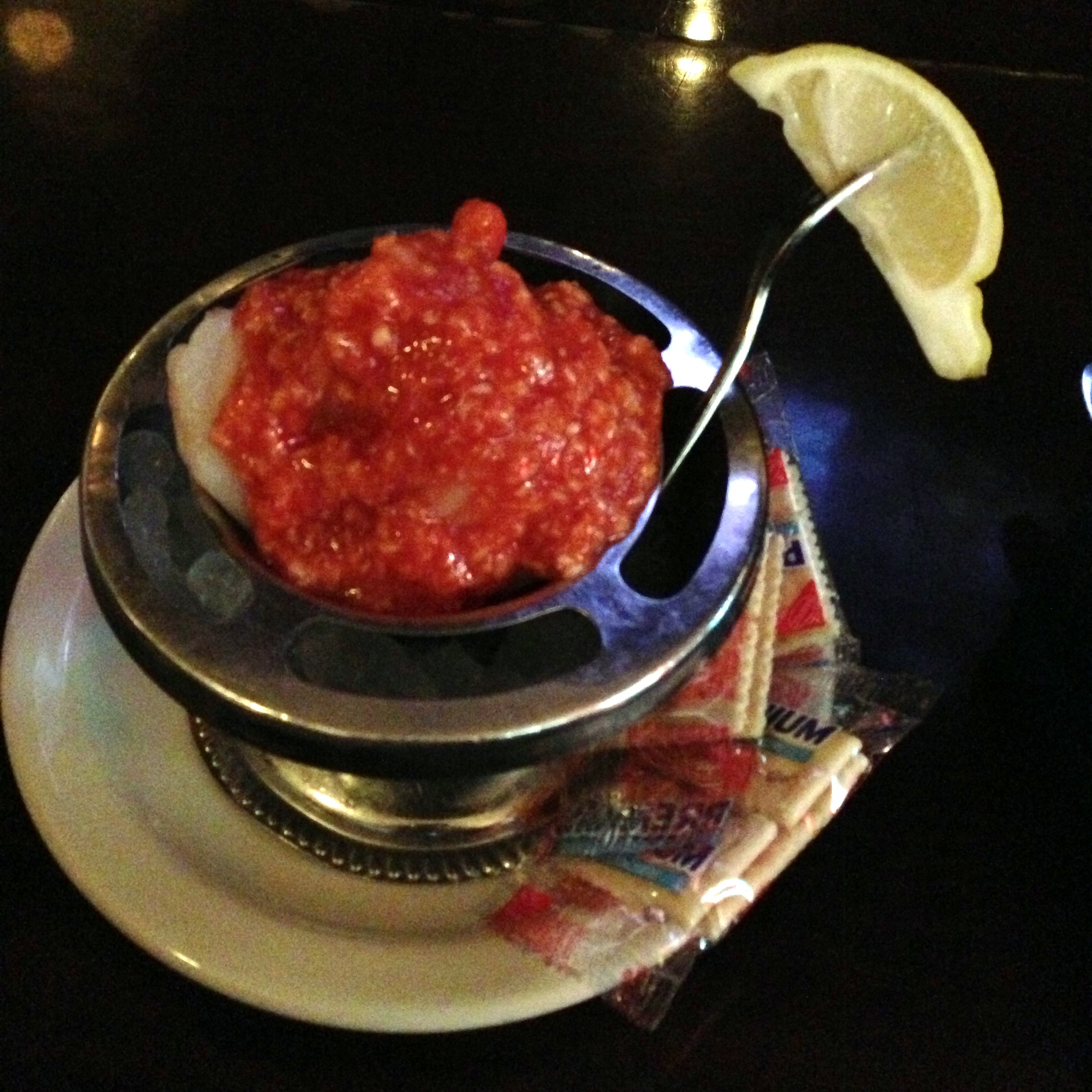
The shrimp cocktail at St. Elmo Steak House

St. Elmo's lone appetizer, a shrimp cocktail, consists of four jumbo shrimp and a dollop of its signature spicy cocktail sauce. According to reporting by Indianapolis Monthly, the restaurant orders four tons of horseradish, 48,600 pounds of shrimp, and 3,800 gallons of sauce for more than 100,000 servings of the popular dish each year. In 2012, St. Elmo began bottling and selling its signature sauce via regional grocers.

Navy bean soup and Red Gold tomato juice are the two available starter options, per tradition. Entrées are served with a choice of sides, either green beans or three varieties of potatoes (fries, baked, or redskin-mashed). Besides steak, other notable dishes include locally sourced Amish chicken, king crab mac 'n' cheese, and wedge salad.

The restaurant's basement wine cellar contains 20,000 bottles, including a bottle of 1902 Château Lafite Rothschild. The restaurant's signature cocktail and most popular beverage, the Elmo Cola, consists of Maker's Mark bourbon infused with Luxardo cherries and Madagascar vanilla beans served alongside a classic bottle of Coca-Cola.

== Reception ==
In 2002, food critic Susan Guyett of The Indianapolis Star called the restaurant an "institution... that put Indianapolis on the national restaurant map". The restaurant's shrimp cocktail has been called one of the "essential eats" of Indianapolis by Indianapolis Monthly. In 2012, St. Elmo was recognized with the America's Classics award by the James Beard Foundation. Due to its distinctive dishes and longevity, the restaurant has been featured in numerous publications, including Esquire, Forbes, The New York Times, Reader's Digest, Smithsonian, Travel + Leisure, and USA Today.

St. Elmo has also been featured in numerous television programs, including The Best Thing I Ever Ate, CBS This Morning, Drinking Made Easy, Food Paradise, Man v. Food, Parks and Recreation, and Thursday Night Football. The restaurant is a popular eatery for visiting celebrities, reportedly a favorite of Peyton Manning, Jim Nantz, and Simon Pagenaud.

== See also ==
- List of steakhouses
- List of attractions and events in Indianapolis
