= Rick DeMulling =

American football player (born 1977)

No. 64, 75
- Position: Guard

Personal information
- Born: July 21, 1977 (age 49); Tacoma, Washington, U.S.
- Listed height: 6 ft 4 in (1.93 m)
- Listed weight: 310 lb (141 kg)

Career information
- High school: Cheney (Cheney, Washington)
- College: Idaho
- NFL draft: 2001: 7th round, 220th overall pick

Career history
- Indianapolis Colts (2001–2004); Detroit Lions (2005–2006); Indianapolis Colts (2007)*; Washington Redskins (2007)
- * Offseason or practice squad member only

Awards and highlights
- 4× All-Big West (1997-2000)

Career NFL statistics
- Games played: 81
- Games started: 53
- Fumble recoveries: 3
- Stats at Pro Football Reference

Rick Elwood DeMulling (born July 21, 1977) is an American former professional football player who was a guard in the National Football League (NFL). He played college football for the Idaho Vandals and was selected by the Indianapolis Colts in the seventh round of the 2001 NFL draft. DeMulling currently lives in Indiana, where he voluntarily coaches the offensive line for Brownsburg High School.

== Early life ==
DeMulling attended Cheney High School from 1993 to 1996 (Cheney, Washington) where he won varsity letters in football, baseball, and basketball.

== College career ==
DeMulling attended the University of Idaho from 1996 to 2001 and was a four-year starter and a three-time All-Big West first-team selection.

== Professional career ==
He was selected in the seventh round, 220th pick, in the 2001 NFL draft by the Indianapolis Colts. He was a regular starter during the 2002–2004 seasons, before signing for the Detroit Lions as a free agent in 2005. After 2 seasons with the Lions, he re-signed for the Colts on March 30, 2007. He was released prior to the start of the 2007 season by the Colts, and was signed as a free agent by the Washington Redskins on September 20, 2007. He was released on November 20. On December 13, 2007, he was re-signed by the Redskins after placing Randy Thomas on IR. He was not re-signed after the season and therefore became a free agent. Now working as a Realtor for Keller Williams Realty Indy Metro West after a few years at F.C. Tucker Company.
