= F.C. Tucker Company =

Real estate company based in Indianapolis, Indiana

- Industry: Real estate
- Founded: 1918
- Founder: Frederick C. (F.C.) Tucker, Sr.
- Headquarters: Indianapolis, IN, U.S.
- Area served: Indiana and Kentucky
- Key people: Jim Litten (current President); Fred "Bud" Tucker (former President)
- Products: Real estate brokerage; Home insurance; Mortgages
- Website: Official Website

F.C. Tucker Company (or simply F.C. Tucker) is a real estate company based in Indianapolis, Indiana. It is the state's largest independent real estate firm with 45 sales offices in Indiana and Kentucky (as of 2010). The F.C. Tucker Company led numerous developments in downtown Indianapolis in the 1960s and 70's including Market Square Arena, the Hilton Indianapolis, and Merchants Plaza. In 2002, a Real Trends survey listed F.C. Tucker as the 12th largest regional brand in the United States.

== History ==
The company was founded in 1918 by Frederick Caldwell (F.C.) Tucker Sr. In the early years, Tucker Sr. operated the business as a sole proprietorship, working in commercial and industrial real estate. In 1947, Tucker's son, Fred C. "Bud" Tucker Jr., joined the company. The elder Tucker died in 1958, and Tucker Jr. purchased the company with three other businessmen: John A. Wallace, Robert E. Houk, and Edward Joseph Boleman.

The company began using its slogan, "Talk to Tucker," in the early 1960s. The slogan remains a part of the company's marketing strategy to the present day. Fred "Bud" Tucker was instrumental in pushing for development in downtown Indianapolis in the 1960s and 70s. In 1967, he persuaded local investors to finance a Hilton hotel near Monument Circle for $3.5 million. It was the first new hotel to be built in downtown Indianapolis in 40 years. One of the investors in the project was L.S. Ayres and Company, an Indianapolis-based department store. The Hilton Indianapolis was completed in 1971 and contained 430 rooms with 14,300 square feet of ballrooms and meeting rooms.

F.C. Tucker and L.S. Ayres were also part of an investor group that sought to develop the Lincoln Hotel block. The $45-million project consisted of three towers (one each for office space, a hotel, and an apartment complex), an open-air plaza, and a convention center. This project would eventually be named "Merchants Plaza."

In the early 1970s, the Indiana Pacers announced their intention of moving to a new arena. Their current arena, the State Fairgrounds Coliseum, had fallen into disrepair. John Jewett, an employee at F.C. Tucker, devised a plan for a new arena in Indianapolis to keep the Pacers in the city. The project became known as the Market Square Arena and development in the arena itself and the surrounding area (including the Gold Building) was led by F.C. Tucker. The city paid for one-third of the arena while an investor group that included F.C. Tucker and the Indiana National Bank paid the remaining two-thirds of the $32-million price tag.

The arena was completed in 1974, but the Pacers had failed to make a profit in Indianapolis by 1977. As a representative of F.C. Tucker, Jewett led a three-month "Save the Pacers" campaign that culminated in a telethon that sought to increase the number of season tickets sold. The campaign was a success and the Pacers remain in Indianapolis to the present day. At one point, F.C. Tucker held a 30% ownership stake in the Pacers.

In the 1980s, the company continued with major development projects, including the Canterbury Hotel. The 1928 building originally known as the Lockerbie Hotel was renovated in 1982 and reopened under the new name. In 1986, Tucker, Houk, Wallace and Boleman retired, and Bud's son, Fred C. Tucker, III, David W. Goodrich and H. James Litten purchased the company. In 1996, Goodrich was elected President of the Society of Industrial and Office Realtors, an international professional organization of commercial realtors. In 1998, he facilitated the merger of the company's Commercial Real Estate Services Division to Turley Martin, an allied commercial real estate firm (through Colliers International) headquartered in St. Louis, Missouri, and sold his interest in the Tucker Company to his partners to become EVP of Turley Martin Tucker. By the year 2000, the Residential Real Estate Services Division had more than 500 sales associates in 13 offices in the Indianapolis area. In 2001, their residential sales revenue was $2.1 billion.

In 2005, Litten received the Distinguished Realtor of the Year award from the Metropolitan Indianapolis Board of Realtors. In 2010, Fred C. Tucker, III retired as company president and sold his stake in the company to James Litten. At the time of his departure, the company oversaw 45 offices in Indiana and Kentucky and maintained 1,500 sales associates in those offices. Tucker, III had been at the company for 33 years. Litten, who started at the company in 1972 as a residential sales associate, became the President of F.C. Tucker on April 1, 2010. In 2013, Litten was named to the Swanepoel Power 200 list as one of the most powerful people in real estate, and as of 2015 the company has grown to 1,500 agents with $3.2 billion in sales.

== Operation ==
The F.C. Tucker Company provides real estate brokerage, home insurance, mortgages, title insurance, and various other insurance and homeowner warranty products. F.C. Tucker also operates 8 additional businesses. These businesses include Home Services, Title Services LLC, Tucker Associates Inc., Tucker Insurance Agency, Tucker Mortgage LLC, Tucker/Schrader Auction Company LP, Tucker Referrals Inc., and the Tucker School of Real Estate. They also maintain a strategic alliance with HMS Home Warranty.
