= Wholesale District, Indianapolis =

Historic and cultural district in Indianapolis, Indiana, US

- Indianapolis Union Station-Wholesale District
- U.S. National Register of Historic Places
- U.S. Historic district
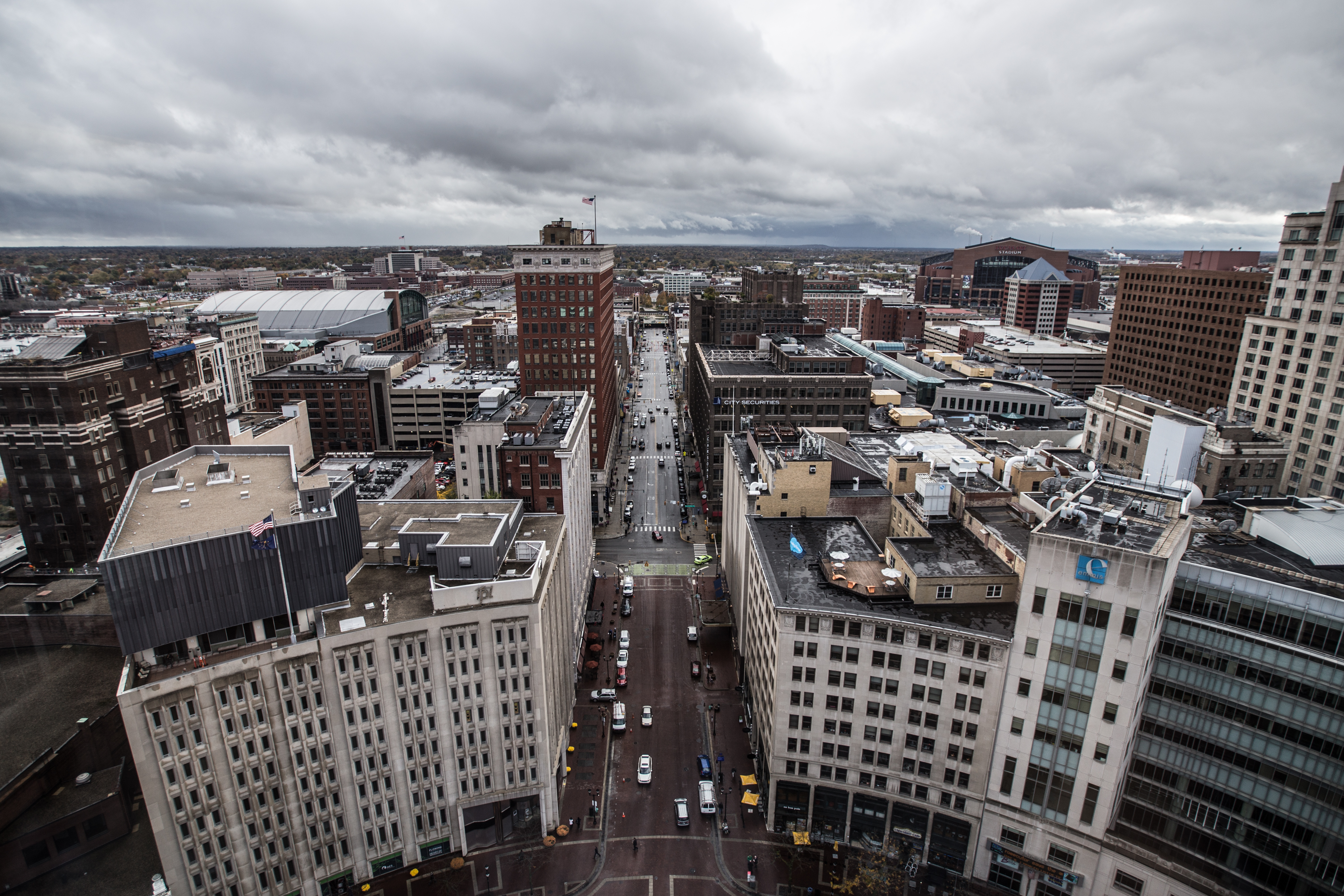
- Aerial perspective of the Wholesale District looking south down Meridian Street from the Soldiers' and Sailors' Monument (2015)

- Location within Indianapolis Location within Indiana Location within the United States
- Location: Roughly bounded by Capitol Ave., Maryland, Delaware and South Sts., Indianapolis, Indiana
- Coordinates: 39°45′51″N 86°9′30″W
- Area: 30 acres (12 ha)
- Built: 1863
- Architect: Multiple
- Architectural style: Italianate, Romanesque, Cast Iron Design
- NRHP reference No.: 82000067
- Added to NRHP: July 14, 1982

The Wholesale District is a designated cultural district in Indianapolis, Indiana, United States. Located in the south-central quadrant of downtown Indianapolis' Mile Square, the district contains the greatest concentration of 19th-century commercial buildings in the city, including Indianapolis Union Station and the Majestic Building. Contemporary landmarks in the district include Circle Centre Mall and the Indianapolis Artsgarden.

== History ==
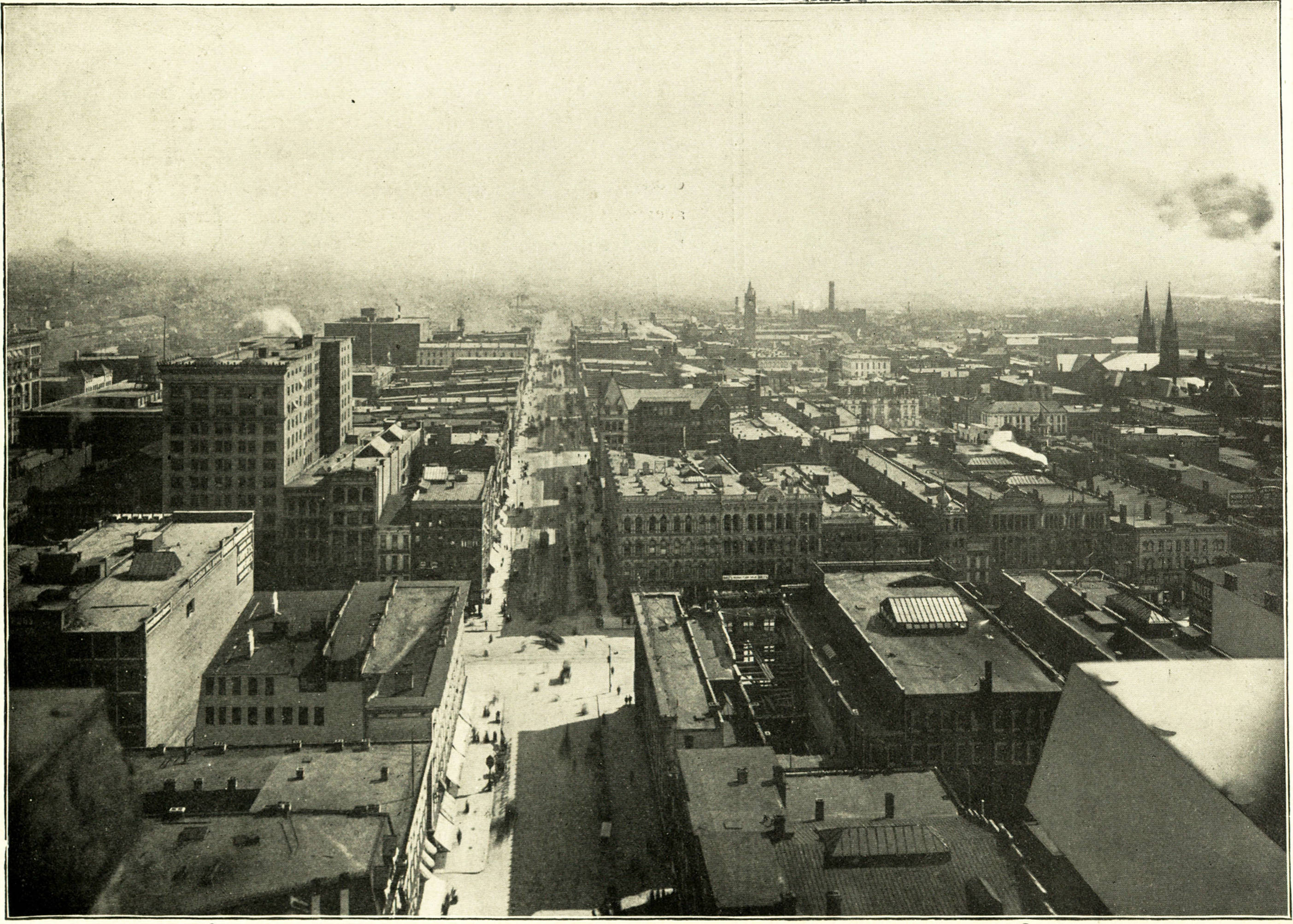
Wholesale District in 1904.

Prior to its designation as a cultural district, the Wholesale District was one of downtown Indianapolis's most decayed and blighted areas. Around the turn of the 20th century, Indianapolis had one of the largest networks of railroads in the United States with hundreds of passenger trains arriving at Union Station daily. The streets near the station were lined with businesses, hotels, warehouses, and retail shops. Wholesale grocers sold fresh goods daily before the advent of the modern grocery store. The district had many such grocers, and also wholesalers who sold dry and finished goods. The House of Crane, whose facade remains part of the Circle Centre Mall development, sold cigars; Hanson, VanCamp & Co. sold hardware. In addition, S. Delaware St. became known as "Commission Row", where farmers brought their produce to merchants who sold the goods for a commission fee.

The Wholesale District was of primary importance in the transformation of Indianapolis from a small town to a big city. Customers no longer had to rely on retailers who sold finished goods shipped from Louisville, Kentucky, or Cincinnati, Ohio. They could now go to a central location and purchase the same items at wholesale prices. With Union Station nearby, wholesalers could ship goods more cheaply and efficiently. The collapse of the economy during the Great Depression devastated the area, with few businesses remaining.

The district was added to the National Register of Historic Places as the Indianapolis Union Station-Wholesale District in 1982, primarily for its notability as the former center for wholesale trade.

Since 1995, more than $686 million has been invested in the area, transforming it into one of the city's largest entertainment and hospitality districts. Recent additions include more than 35 new businesses, Circle Centre, Gainbridge Fieldhouse, The Residences at CityWay, restoration of the Omni Severin Hotel, and a number of upscale restaurants. The area also includes the Hilbert Circle Theatre, home of the Indianapolis Symphony Orchestra, which underwent a $2.5 million renovation in 2003. St. Elmo Steak House has been a fixture in the district since its founding in 1902.

== See also ==
- Indianapolis Cultural Districts
- National Register of Historic Places listings in Center Township, Marion County, Indiana
