= Ehrenkrantz Eckstut & Kuhn Architects =

Architectural firm

Ehrenkrantz Eckstut & Kuhn Architects (EE&K) is an international architectural firm with offices in New York City, Washington DC, Los Angeles, and Shanghai. EE&K's expertise spans large-scale urban development and infrastructure projects, mixed-use urban development and waterfronts, school and campus design, historic preservation and adaptive re-use.

== History ==
The firm was founded as Building Systems Development by Ezra Ehrenkrantz in 1959 in Berkeley, California. In the early 1960s, Ehrenkrantz developed the School Construction Systems Development (SCSD) project, an influential systems building approach for the construction of public schools which resulted in the design of dozens of schools in California.

In 1972, Ehrenkrantz established an office in New York, renamed the firm The Ehrenkrantz Group, and became founding director of the Center for Architecture & Building Science Research at the New Jersey Institute of Technology. In addition to developing building systems, the Ehrenkrantz Group designed housing, educational, health, laboratory and commercial buildings. The Ehrenkrantz Group's work included master plans for New York City Technical College in Brooklyn and Stevens Institute of Technology in Hoboken, NJ, and facilities renewal at Columbia. From 1966 to 1968, Ezra Ehrenkrantz served on the White House Task Force on the City. In 1990, he received the President's Award of the National Institute of Building Sciences, and in 1991 won the Presidential Design Award for a Department of Veterans Affairs hospital unit. He was awarded the Medal of Honor of the American Institute of Architects' New York chapter in 1993.

In 1986, Stanton Eckstut joined the firm and the Ehrenkrantz Group became known as The Ehrenkrantz Group and Eckstut Architects. Eckstut was previously director of the Urban Design program at the Columbia Graduate School of Architecture, Planning and Preservation. Together with former partner Alex Cooper, he was responsible for the Master Plan for Battery Park City, winner of the Urban Land Institute's 2010 Heritage Award, which cited the Plan for having "facilitated the private development of 9.3 million square feet of commercial space, 7.2 million square feet of residential space, and nearly 36 acres of open space in lower Manhattan, becoming a model for successful large-scale planning efforts and marking a positive shift away from the urban renewal mindset of the time." In 1997, Denis Kuhn, a noted preservationist, became a partner in the firm, which then became Ehrenkrantz Eckstut & Kuhn (EE&K) Architects. In 2010, EE&K Architects and Perkins Eastman announced that they would merge.

== Significant projects ==
In the late 1980s, EE&K developed the Prototype Schools Program for the New York City School Construction Authority (SCA), a standardized prototype design for primary schools consisting of five different building blocks that can be configured in various ways to respond to different contexts and site conditions. The first school constructed under the system was the 1,200-seat P.S. 7 in Queens.

In the early 1990s, the firm opened an office in Los Angeles where they took on several major projects: Patsaouras Transit Plaza, the city's first intermodal transit station (adjacent to Union Station (Los Angeles), and Hollywood and Highland, a commercial and entertainment complex. Large-scale projects followed at Rainbow Harbor in Long Beach and Paseo Colorado in Pasadena, an early example of the transformation of a traditional shopping mall into a mixed-use development. Other major retail projects include Circle Centre in downtown Indianapolis (1995), a mixed-use shopping, restaurant and entertainment complex that includes the Indianapolis Artsgarden, a public pavilion for the arts.

The firm's master planning and urban design work includes MetroTech Center (1992), a 4,700,000-square-foot (440,000 m^{2}) redevelopment in downtown Brooklyn, which combines a campus combining educational and corporate office buildings with MetroTech Commons, New York's largest privately owned public space.

EE&K's campus buildings include the Binghamton University Appalachian Collegiate Center, a dining hall and student center for Binghamton's Mountainview College; it won an AIA New York Design Award in 2005.

== Recent work ==
In 2004, following a six-month-long invited design competition, MGM Mirage selected EE&K's conceptual master plan for CityCenter in Las Vegas, the largest privately funded construction project in the U.S. A 66-acre (270,000 m^{2}), mixed-use urban development with buildings designed by a range of architects, CityCenter opened in December 2009.

In 2005, EE&K opened an office in Shanghai when they began work on their first significant project in China: the Huishan North Bund, a mixed-use waterfront revitalization development. The firm is currently working in over a half dozen cities with primarily domestic Chinese clients.

Thirty years after authoring the original Master Plan for Battery Park City, EE&K are the design architects for the last two building sites in Battery Park City. When the two buildings, Liberty Green and Liberty Luxe, are finished in 2011, Battery Park City will officially be complete.

== Selected projects ==
- Battery Park City Master Plan, New York, NY
- Alexander Hamilton US Custom House, New York, NY
- Swarthmore College Master Plan, Kohlberg Hall, Swarthmore, PA
- Gateway Center, Los Angeles, CA
- Science City at Union Station, Kansas City, MO
- Circle Centre Mall, Indianapolis, IN
- Hollywood & Highland, Los Angeles, CA
- Paseo Colorado, Pasadena, CA
- School Without Walls, Washington, DC
- George Washington University, Foggy Bottom Campus Plan, Washington, DC
- George Mason University Southwest & North Sector Plans, Fairfax, VA
- Philadelphia Market Street East Plan, Philadelphia, PA
- Kennedy Center, Washington, DC
- Louisiana Department of Corrections Master Plan, Louisiana
- Houston Intermodal Transit Center, Houston, TX

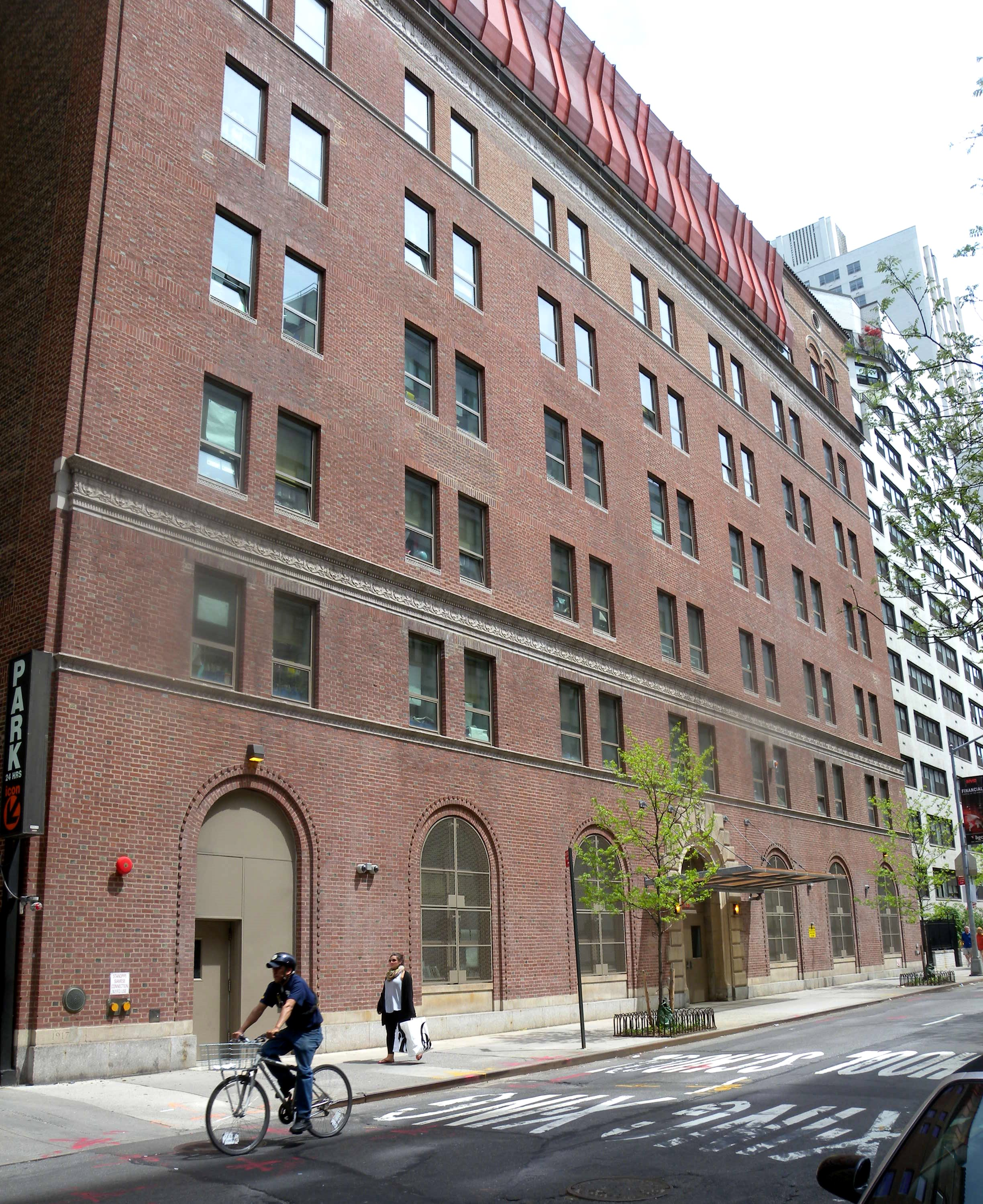
Beekman PS 59

- Beekman Hill International School, PS 59, New York, NY
- Binghamton University Appalachian Collegiate Center, Binghamton, NY
- Huishan Waterfront, Shanghai, China
- Hangzhou-Mews Neighborhood, Hangzhou, China
- Central Park Boathouse, New York, NY
- Arverne-by-the-Sea, Arverne, Queens NY
- CityCenter Master Plan, Las Vegas, NV

== Current projects ==
- Buffalo Inner Harbor, Buffalo, NY
- Cleveland Waterfront Development Plan, Cleveland, OH
- Changshou Lu, Guangzhou, China
- Southwest Waterfront, Washington DC

== Principals ==
- Stanton Eckstut, FAIA
- Matthew J. Bell, FAIA
- Peter David Cavaluzzi, FAIA
- William C. Donohoe, APA
- James Greenberg, AIA
- Sean O’Donnell, AIA, LEED AP
- R. Douglas Smith, AIA
- Chao-Ming Wu, AIA

== Publications ==
- Ezra Ehrenkrantz and John D. Kay, "Flexibility through Standardization," Progressive Architecture (July 1957): 105-115.
- Ezra Ehrenkrantz, "Need for Architectural Research," Progressive Architecture (January 1960): 9-11.
- Ezra Ehrenkrantz, "Better Schools for the Money," AIA Journal (September 1964): 91-96.
- Ezra Ehrenkrantz, "The System to Systems," AIA Journal (May 1970): 56-59.
- Ezra Ehrenkrantz, "Towards a Social Architecture: The Role of School Building in Post-War England," AA Files 15 (1987): 110-111.
- Ezra Ehrenkrantz, Architectural Systems: A Needs, Resources, and Design Approach (New York: McGraw-Hill), 1989.
