= Fred C. Tucker =

Fred C. "Bud" Tucker, Jr.
- Born: 1918; Indianapolis, Indiana
- Died: December 10, 1994 (aged 76); Indianapolis, Indiana
- Education: DePauw University
- Occupations: Businessman; Real estate broker
- Known for: Former CEO of F.C. Tucker Company
- Spouse: Ermajean Tucker
- Children: 2

Fred C. "Bud" Tucker, Jr. (1918 – December 10, 1994) was an American businessman and real estate broker who served as the owner and CEO of the F.C. Tucker Company from 1958 to 1986. He is best known for leading development and revitalization efforts in downtown Indianapolis.

In his tenure as the leader of the F.C. Tucker Company, he helped establish the Hilton Indianapolis, Market Square Arena, the OneAmerica Tower, One Indiana Square, Merchants Plaza, and many other projects. He was recognized as "Realtor of the Year" by the Indianapolis Real Estate Board and the Indiana Real Estate Association in 1967 and served as the president of the National Association of Real Estate Boards (now the National Association of Realtors).

== Early life and education ==
Tucker was born and grew up in Indianapolis, Indiana. His father, Fred C. Tucker, Sr., founded the F.C. Tucker company the same year that Tucker, Jr. was born (1918). Tucker, Jr. attended DePauw University and graduated in 1940. While in college, he served as the fraternity president of DePauw's Delta Tau Delta chapter. During World War II, Tucker, Jr. served in the United States Navy. The F.C. Tucker Company operated as a sole proprietorship prior to Tucker, Jr. joining his father.

== Career ==
Tucker began work at the F.C. Tucker Company in 1947. When his father died in 1958, Tucker, Jr. purchased the company with three friends and fellow businessmen: Robert Houk, John A. Wallace, and Edward Joseph "Joe" Boleman. In the early 1960s, the ownership group devised the "Talk to Tucker" slogan which appeared on T-shaped yard signs. "Talk to Tucker" continues to be used by the company into the present day.

In 1967, Tucker convinced investors to finance a $3.5-million Hilton hotel project in downtown Indianapolis. The project would eventually lead to the construction of the hotel at Monument Circle in 1971. Tucker also spearheaded development on Merchants Plaza, an area southwest of Monument Circle that contained office space, a new hotel, apartments, a convention center, and an open-air plaza.

In the early 1970s Tucker also worked closely with then mayor Richard Lugar on a new arena project for the Indiana Pacers. Tucker oversaw the planning and design of what would become known as Market Square Arena. The arena cost $32 million to build and was funded by the city and other private investors (including the F.C. Tucker Company and the Indiana National Bank). The F.C. Tucker Company had a 30% ownership stake in the Pacers. The arena was completed in 1974. Three years later, the cash-strapped Pacers threatened to relocate if they couldn't come up with 8,000 season ticket holders by the beginning of the season. The F.C. Tucker Company led a "Save the Pacers" campaign that culminated in a live telethon in order to keep the Pacers in Indianapolis.

In 1971, Tucker was elected president of the National Association of Real Estate Boards. He was also the president of the Indianapolis Real Estate Board and the Indiana Real Estate Association. He served as a member of the President's Rent Advisory Board and was also the Chairman of the Depauw University Board of Trustees. In 1974, he was elected president of the Delta Tau Delta fraternity.

Tucker worked at F.C. Tucker into the 1980s. He invested in redevelopment projects like the Canterbury Hotel in 1982. In 1986, he retired as CEO and president of the F.C. Tucker Company. He sold the company to his son, Fred C. Tucker, III, and two other businessman: David Goodrich and current F.C. Tucker president, James Litten. He continued serving as president of Tucker Investment Company, a subsidiary of F.C. Tucker. Tucker died on December 10, 1994.

== Recognition ==
Tucker was named the 1967 "Realtor of the Year" by the Indianapolis Real Estate Board and the Indiana Real Estate Association. In 1986, he was honored by the Northwood Institute with an award for outstanding business leaders. The F.C. Tucker Company holds an annual awards ceremony to honor employees. One of the awards is called the "Bud Tucker Volunteer of the Year Award" in honor of Fred C. "Bud" Tucker, Jr.

== Personal life ==
Tucker was married to Ermajean Tucker until his death in 1994. The couple had two children, a daughter and a son (named Fred C. Tucker, III).
