= Indianapolis Artsgarden =

Performing arts venue in Indianapolis, Indiana, US

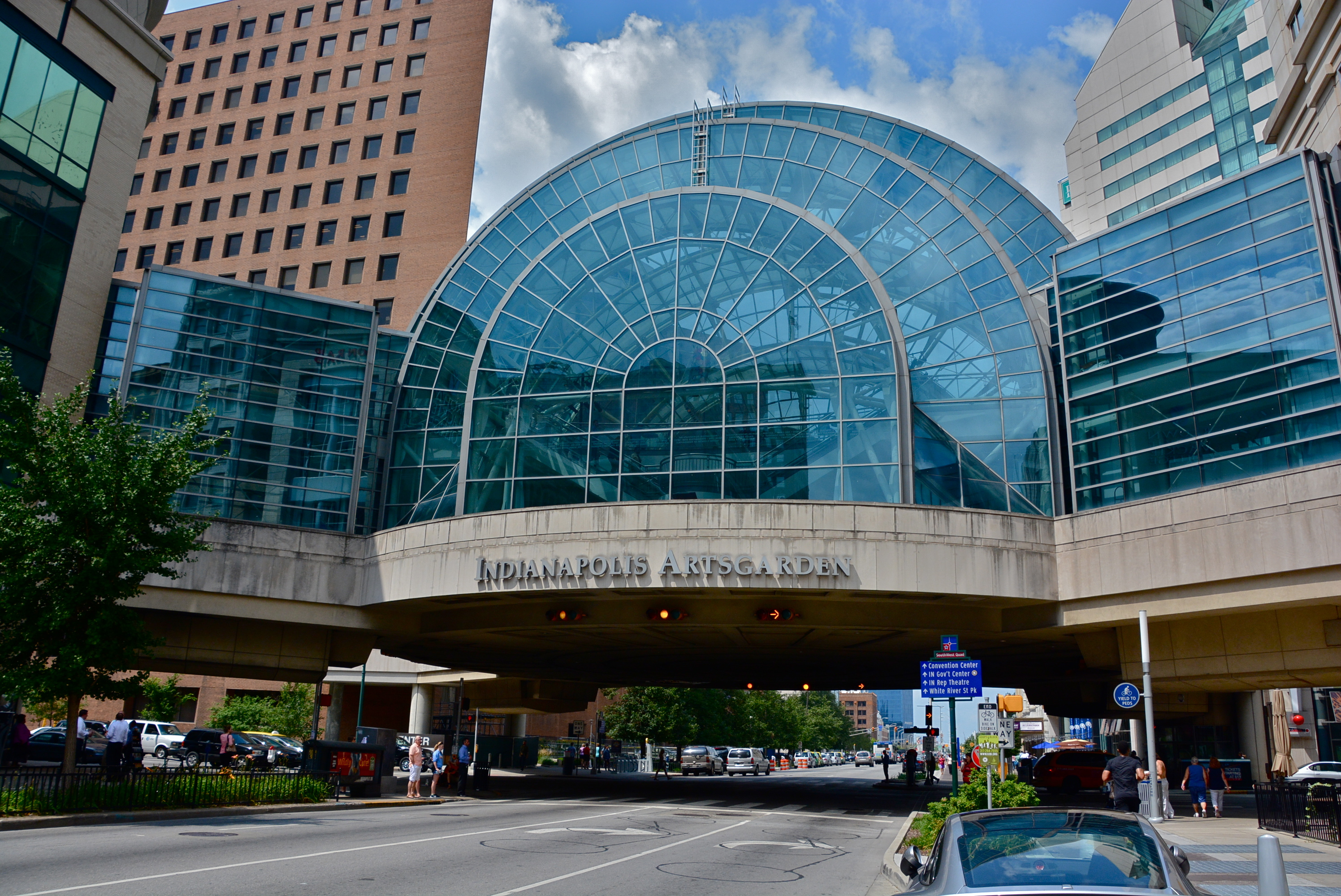
- Artsgarden looking west from Washington Street in 2015
- Interactive map of the Indianapolis Artsgarden area

General information
- Status: Completed
- Location: Intersection of Washington & Illinois streets, 110 W. Washington St., Indianapolis, Indiana, United States
- Coordinates: 39.76717°N 86.15985°W
- Completed: 1995
- Cost: $12 million
- Owner: Indy Arts Council

Height
- Height: 95 feet (29 m)

Dimensions
- Diameter: 110 feet (34 m)

Technical details
- Floor area: 19,000 square feet (1,800 m^{2}) (including bridges)

Design and construction
- Architecture firm: Ehrenkrantz Eckstut & Kuhn Architects
- Structural engineer: Weiskopf & Pickworth LLP
- Main contractor: DeMars Program Management
- Awards: Engineering Award of Excellence National Winner 1998

Other information
- Seating capacity: 600 standing, 400 seated, or 250 at tables

Website
- indyarts.org/the-artsgarden

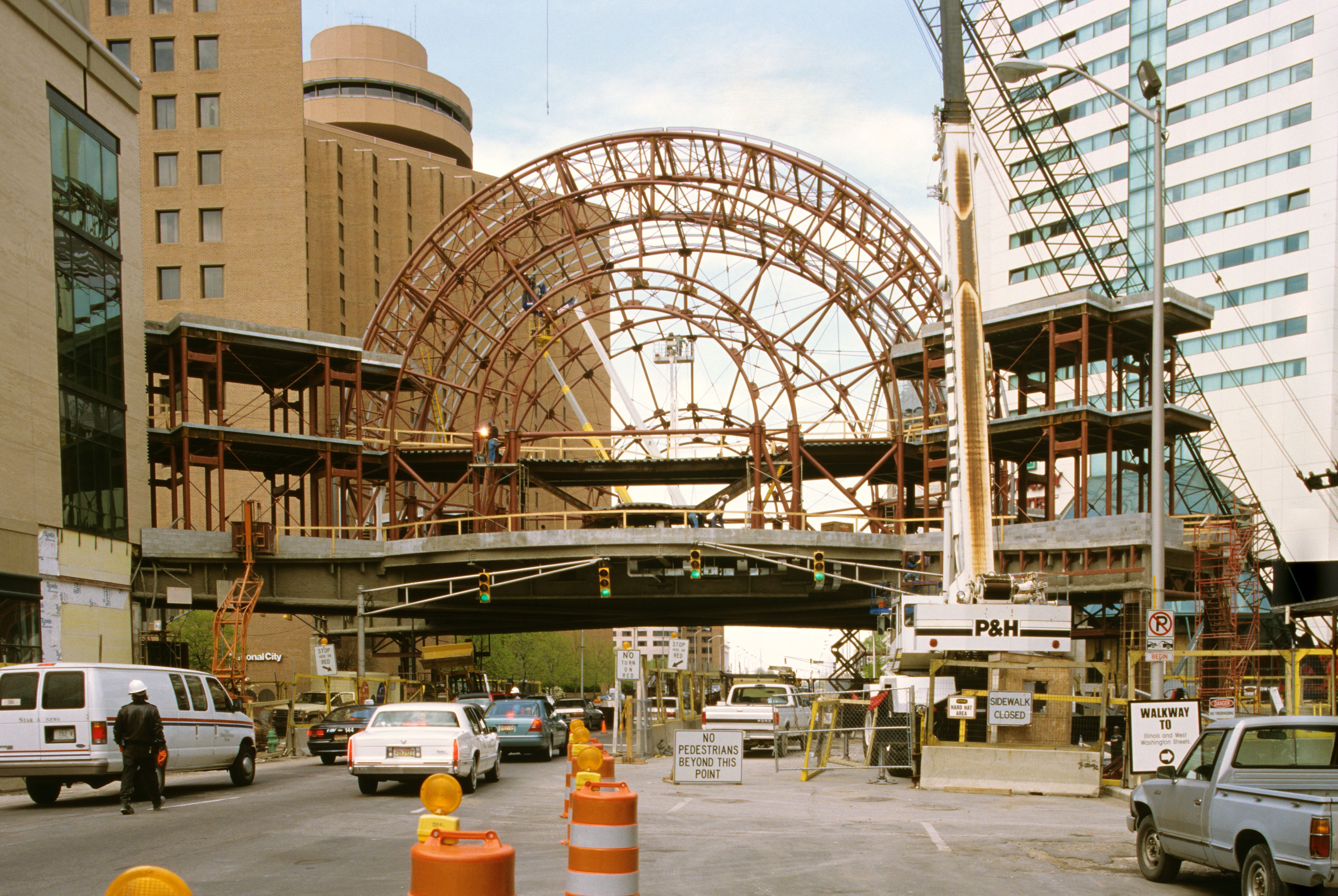
Construction of Indianapolis Artsgarden. Camera facing west on Washington Street.

The Indianapolis Artsgarden is a glassed dome spanning the intersection of Washington and Illinois streets in downtown Indianapolis, Indiana. It serves not only as a pedestrian connector between Circle Centre Mall and nearby office buildings and hotels but also as a venue for the display and performance of artistic and musical works (more than 300 performances take place in the Artsgarden each year). In addition, the Artsgarden houses the Cultural Concierge, which provides local arts and cultural information, maps, and visitor guides. The structure, including the walkways connecting it to the adjacent buildings, is owned and operated by the Indy Arts Council.

The Artsgarden was designed by Ehrenkrantz Eckstut & Kuhn Architects who also designed the adjacent Circle Centre Mall. Blackburn Architects collaborated on the design and execution. The $12 million cost was funded by the Lilly Endowment.

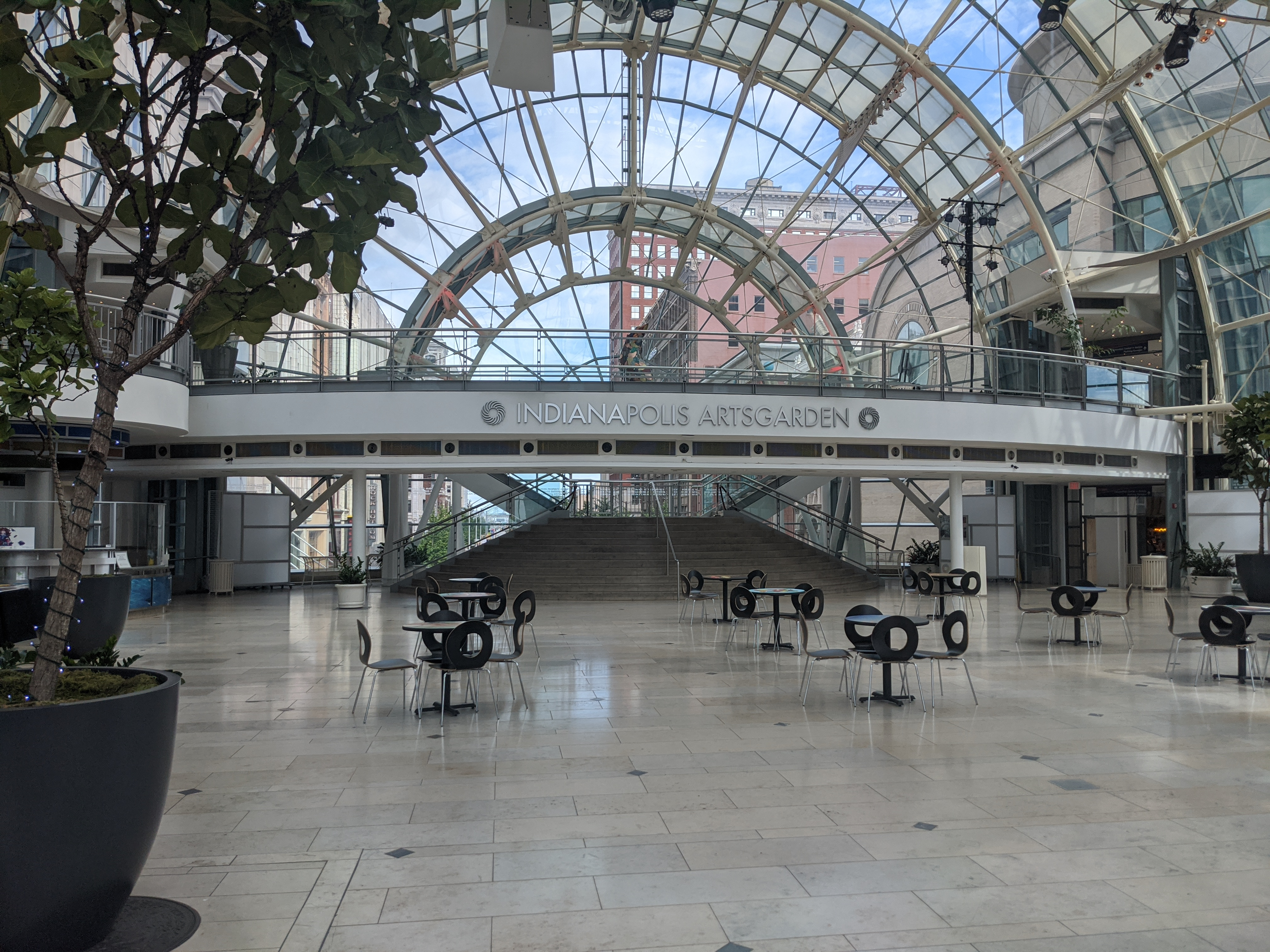
Inside view of the Artsgarden

The floor of the Artsgarden stands 17 feet (5.2 m) above the intersection. A series of arched steel trusses creates a graduated set of glassed vaults, the tallest of which is 75 feet (23 m) above the floor and 95 feet (29 m) above the street. The design yields a total free-span length of 110 feet (34 m) within the dome. A total of 32,000 square feet (3,000 m^{2}) of glass is used in the structure to give it an airy, open feel. The entire dome is set on two pairs of 185-foot (56 m) plate girders that diagonally span the intersection.

When initially constructed in 1995, the Indianapolis Artsgarden connected the second level of Circle Centre Mall on the southeast corner of the intersection with an upper level of the Claypool Courts on the northwest corner, while stairways provided access to the ground-level sidewalks on the northeast and southwest corners. In 2006, the Conrad Indianapolis was built on the site of the small park that had been on the northeast corner and the stairway there was replaced with a direct connection to the hotel. In 2011 construction was started on a connector to the 16-story PNC Center and Hyatt Regency hotel complex on the southwest corner. The owners of the complex in 1995 had declined to help pay for the connector; in 2010 an agreement was reached to split the $1.2 million cost, completing the original concept of the Artsgarden. The connector was completed in January 2012.

== See also ==
- List of attractions and events in Indianapolis
