= Conrad Indianapolis =

Hotel and residential building in Indianapolis, Indiana, US

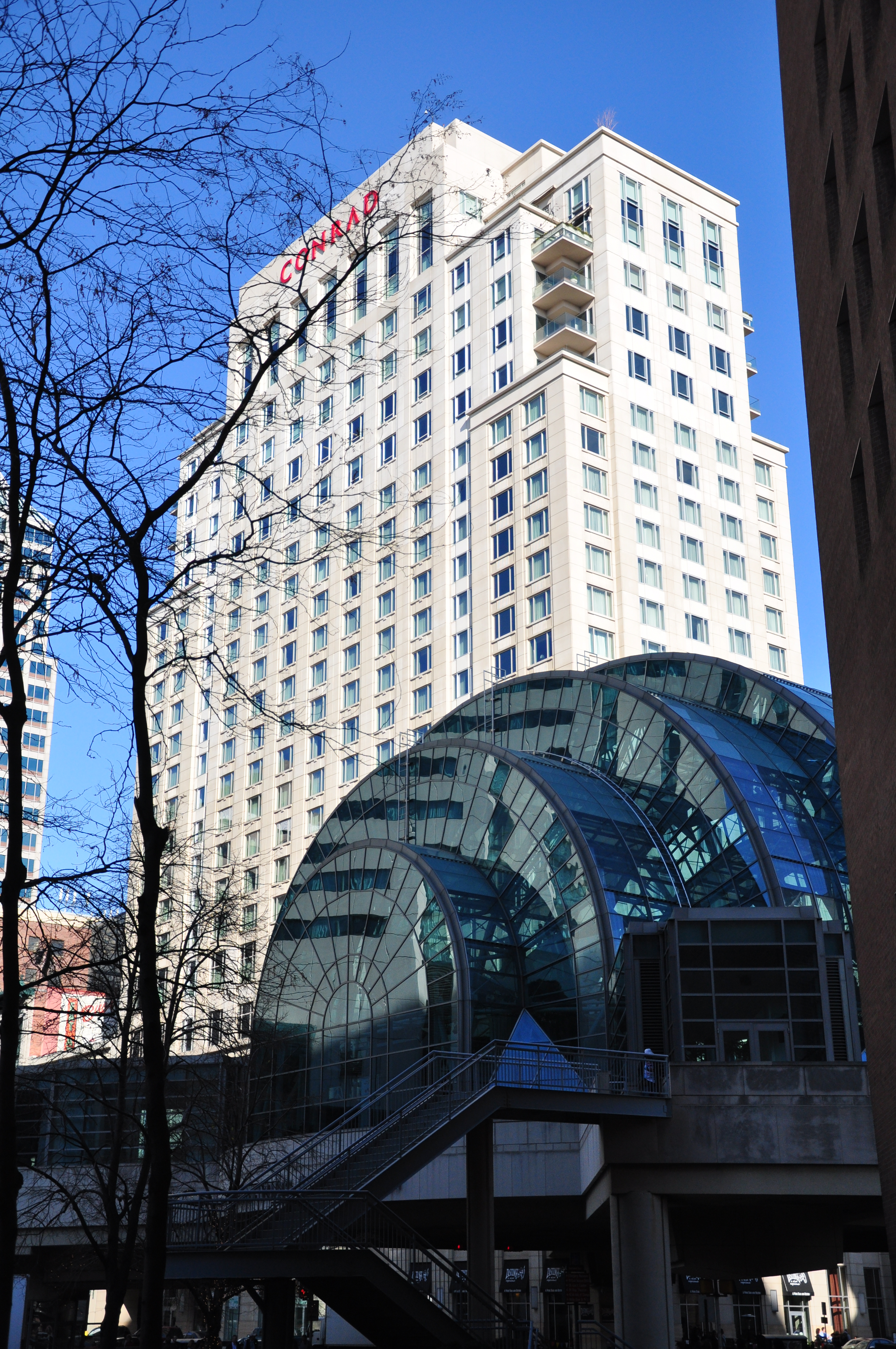
- Indianapolis Conrad behind the Artsgarden

General information
- Type: Hotel
- Location: 50 West Washington Street; Indianapolis, Indiana
- Coordinates: 39°46′2.10″N 86°9′33.29″W
- Completed: March 27, 2006; 20 years ago

Height
- Roof: 287 ft (87 m)

Technical details
- Floor count: 23

The Conrad Indianapolis is a high-rise luxury hotel in Indianapolis, Indiana. It was completed in 2006 and has 23 floors. The building includes street-level retail, 247 hotel rooms, and 18 residential condominiums. Conrad Hotels is one of the luxury brands of Hilton Hotels & Resorts. In 2007 and 2008, Conde Nast Traveler ranked Conrad Indianapolis in the top 100 in the world and Expedia Insiders’ 2009 Select list of the world's best hotels named Conrad as number one in the United States.

The Conrad Indianapolis is connected to the downtown skywalk system via the Indianapolis Artsgarden.

According to the Indianapolis Business Journal, the Conrad Indianapolis has 150 full-time employees and was last renovated in 2015.

== See also ==
- List of tallest buildings in Indianapolis
- List of tallest buildings in Indiana
