= Omni Severin Hotel =

Historic hotel in Indianapolis, Indiana, US

- Hotel Severin
- U.S. National Register of Historic Places
- U.S. Historic district – Contributing property
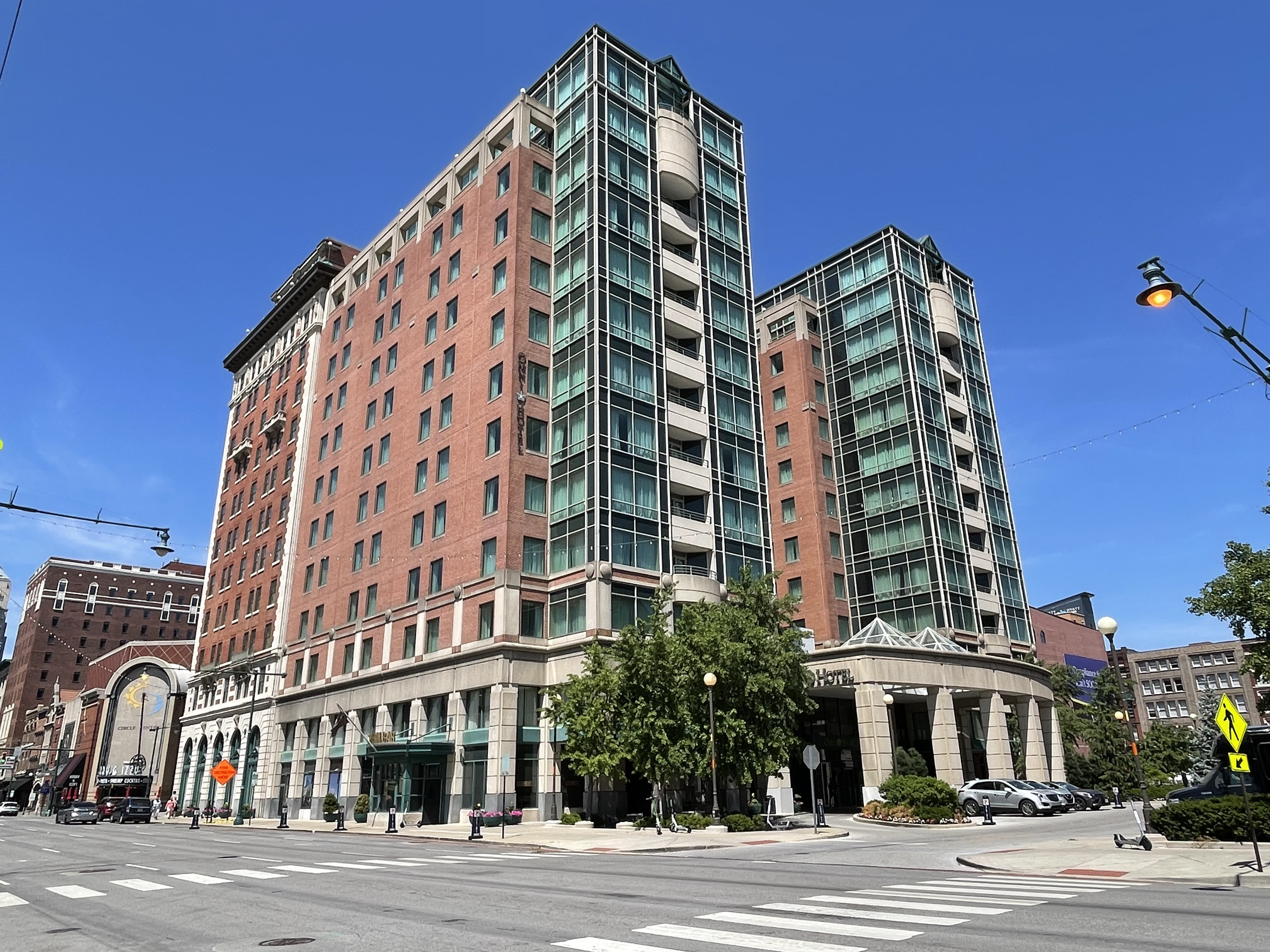
- Omni Severin Hotel in 2022, showing the 1990 addition.

- Location within Indianapolis Location within Indianapolis Location within Indiana Location within the United States
- Location: Indianapolis, Indiana
- Coordinates: 39°45′49.6″N 86°9′34.5″W
- Built: 1913
- Part of: Indianapolis Union Station-Wholesale District
- NRHP reference No.: 82000067
- Added to NRHP: July 14, 1982

The Omni Severin Hotel is a historic hotel, opened in 1913. It is a contributing property in the Indianapolis Union Station Wholesale District historic district. The hotel is located directly across Jackson Place from the Union Station head house. It is a member of Historic Hotels of America, an official program of the National Trust for Historic Preservation.

== History ==
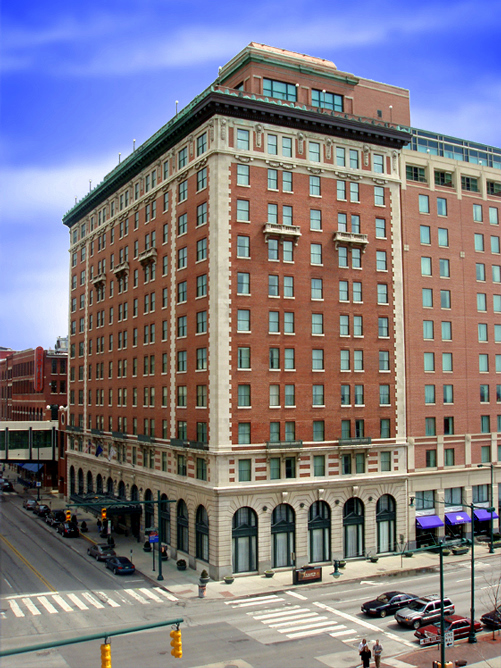
The hotel's original 1913 wing.

The Hotel Severin was constructed by Henry Severin Jr., with help from Indianapolis Motor Speedway founders Carl G. Fisher and James A. Allison. It was built on the site of the earlier Grand Hotel, which opened in 1876 and burned down in 1905. The first event at the hotel, the Christamore Settlement Ball, was held on August 22, 1913. The Hotel Severin received its first registered guest the next day, Indiana Congressman James Eli Watson.

The Severin was bought by Warren M. Atkinson in 1966. He renovated it, at a cost of $2.5 million, and renamed it The Atkinson of Indianapolis. Mansur Development Corporation bought the Atkinson in July 1988. The hotel underwent a $40 million restoration and expansion, which added two wings to the back of the original 1913 building, forming a U-shaped structure. The hotel's entrance was moved to the rear, where a new lobby was constructed. The 424-room hotel reopened on February 3, 1990 managed by Omni Hotels, as the Omni Severin Hotel. Ten years later, Mansur sold the Severin to Omni Hotels.

The hotel retains many original 1913 elements. The Severin Ballroom Lobby is the lobby of the original hotel, and its immense Austrian crystal chandelier, marble staircase and other fittings are all original. The original mailbox still serves the hotel. The large antique dressers on each elevator landing were originally in the guest rooms. The Omni Severin is the oldest and longest operating hotel in downtown Indianapolis.

== See also ==
- List of Historic Hotels of America
