= Le Méridien Indianapolis Hotel =

Historic hotel in Indianapolis, Indiana, US

- Former Lockerbie Hotel
- U.S. Historic district – Contributing property
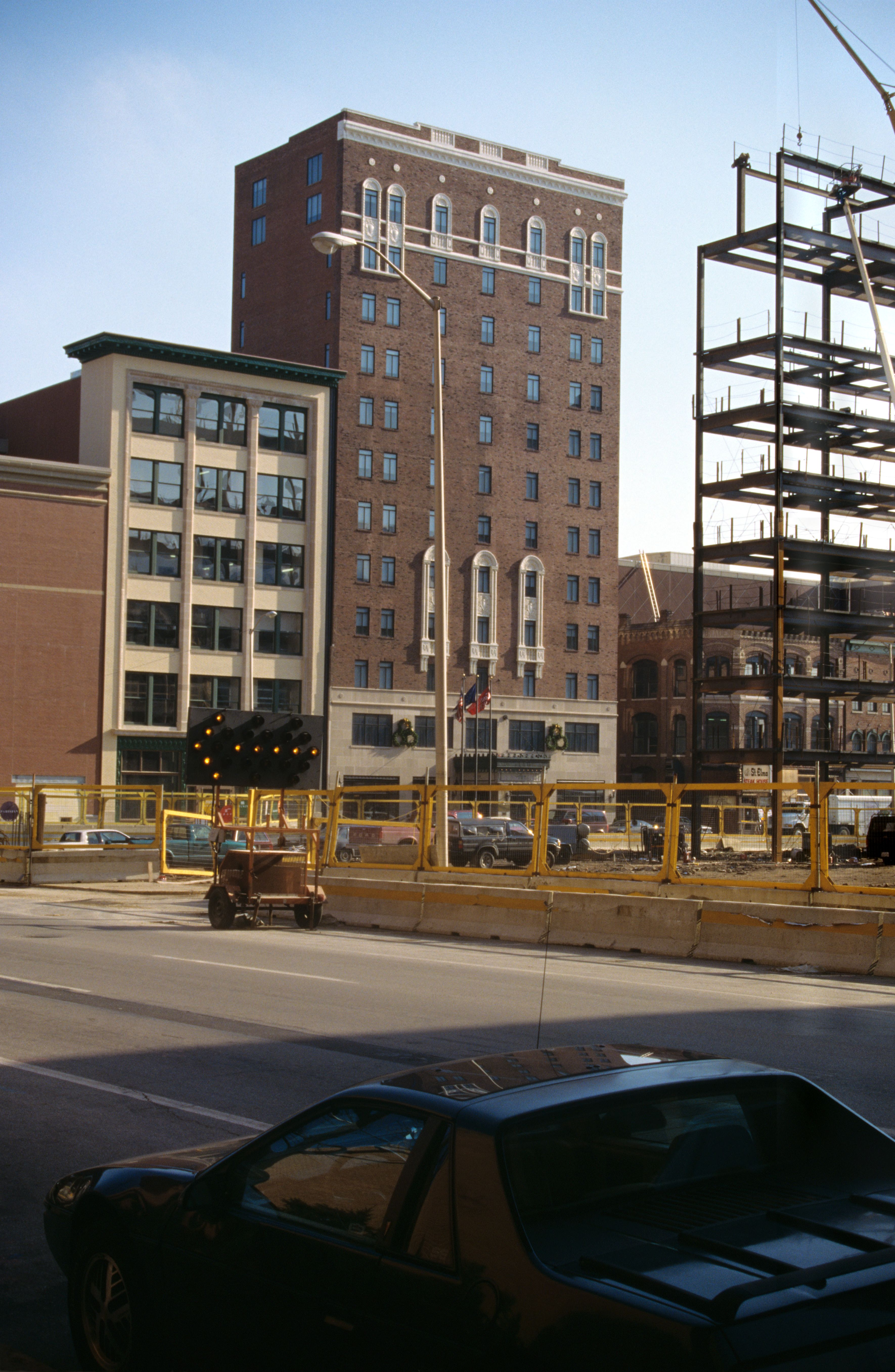
- Canterbury Hotel in 1994

- Location within Indianapolis Location within Indianapolis Location within Indiana Location within the United States
- Location: 117-25 South Illinois Street, Indianapolis, Indiana
- Coordinates: 39°45′54.4″N 86°9′34.9″W
- Part of: Indianapolis Union Station—Wholesale Historic District (ID82000067)
- Added to NRHP: July 14, 1982

Le Méridien Indianapolis is a historic hotel in downtown Indianapolis, Indiana. It is listed on the National Register of Historic Places as a part of the Wholesale District historic district.

A hotel has existed on the 123 S. Illinois Street site since 1858 when architect Francis Costigan designed, built, and began operating the 4-story Oriental Hotel. Costigan's hotel was demolished in 1928 and the current 12-story hotel was constructed. It was first known as the Lockerbie, later as the Warren, and then as the Canterbury Hotel from 1983 to 2013. It is attached to the Circle Centre mall, which was constructed around the hotel. In late 2014, it opened as the Le Méridien Indianapolis Hotel.
