= Simon Youth Foundation =

US non-profit organisation

Simon Youth Foundation (SYF) is a non-profit, 501(c)(3) organization that supports efforts in the United States to improve the national academic dropout rate and increase college accessibility by partnering with established public school systems. The foundation's parent company is the Simon Property Group. Although SYF works closely with Simon Property Group, it is not a corporate or grant-making foundation. SYF is headquartered in Indianapolis, Indiana. Its current CEO is Andrea Neely.

== Mission ==
The mission of SYF is to "foster and improve educational opportunities, career development, and life skills that transform the lives of at-risk youth through focused programs and initiatives with our public school and post-secondary education partners."

== History ==
In 1997, executives of Simon Property Group and Simon family members (Deborah J. Simon, specifically) began discussing the need for an initiative to improve education on the national level for at-risk youth. Simon Property Group established a committee to develop the idea of using Simon Malls as a location for alternative education. According to SYF, "The concept of placing schools in malls grew out of the belief that many at-risk students could and would graduate if provided the right support." In 1998, SYF became an independent, non-profit organization. Working with a public school district in San Antonio Texas, SYF launched its first alternative school at Rolling Oaks Mall. By the end of 1998, the Century III Mall opened its own program in association with the fifteen school districts that surround West Mifflin, Pennsylvania.

In 2000, SYF established a scholarship program. As of 2021, SYF has awarded $20 million to 5,900 students from 42 states.

== Programs ==
SYF's efforts to improve the national drop-out rate and increase access to college are two-fold: through Simon Youth Academies and scholarships. Academies are alternative schools developed as a partnership between SYF and one or more public school districts. Academies are located primarily in Simon Malls.

Academies differ from traditional schools in small class sizes, shorter class days, and the use of technology. Students who are "at-risk" of not finishing school on time, or at all, can attend Academies and earn their high school diplomas.

In 2020–2021, the Academies program graduated 2,109 students and had a graduation rate of 96%. Since 1998, 24,092 students have enrolled in Academies with a 90% cumulative graduation rate.

== Awards and recognition ==
SYF has received several awards and notable mentions for its efforts in education. In 2008, SYF's partnership with CVS Caremark to offer job- and life-skills training and internships was selected as a finalist for the U.S. Chamber of Commerce Business Civic Leadership Center's Partnership Award. SYF was also honored by the Education Commission of the States (ECS) that same year, along with receiving two Albert Sussman International Community Support Awards from the International Council of Shopping Centers Foundation. The Crystal Star Award of Excellence in Dropout Recovery, Intervention and Prevention was presented to SYF on November 9, 2008, by the National Dropout Prevention Center/Network and the ERC (now call SYF Academies) program was honored as an "Exemplary Program" in 2009. In 2010, SYF was awarded the Honorable Mention Community Partnership Award by the Mutual of America Foundation.
