= PNC Center (Fort Wayne) =

Building in Fort Wayne, Indiana

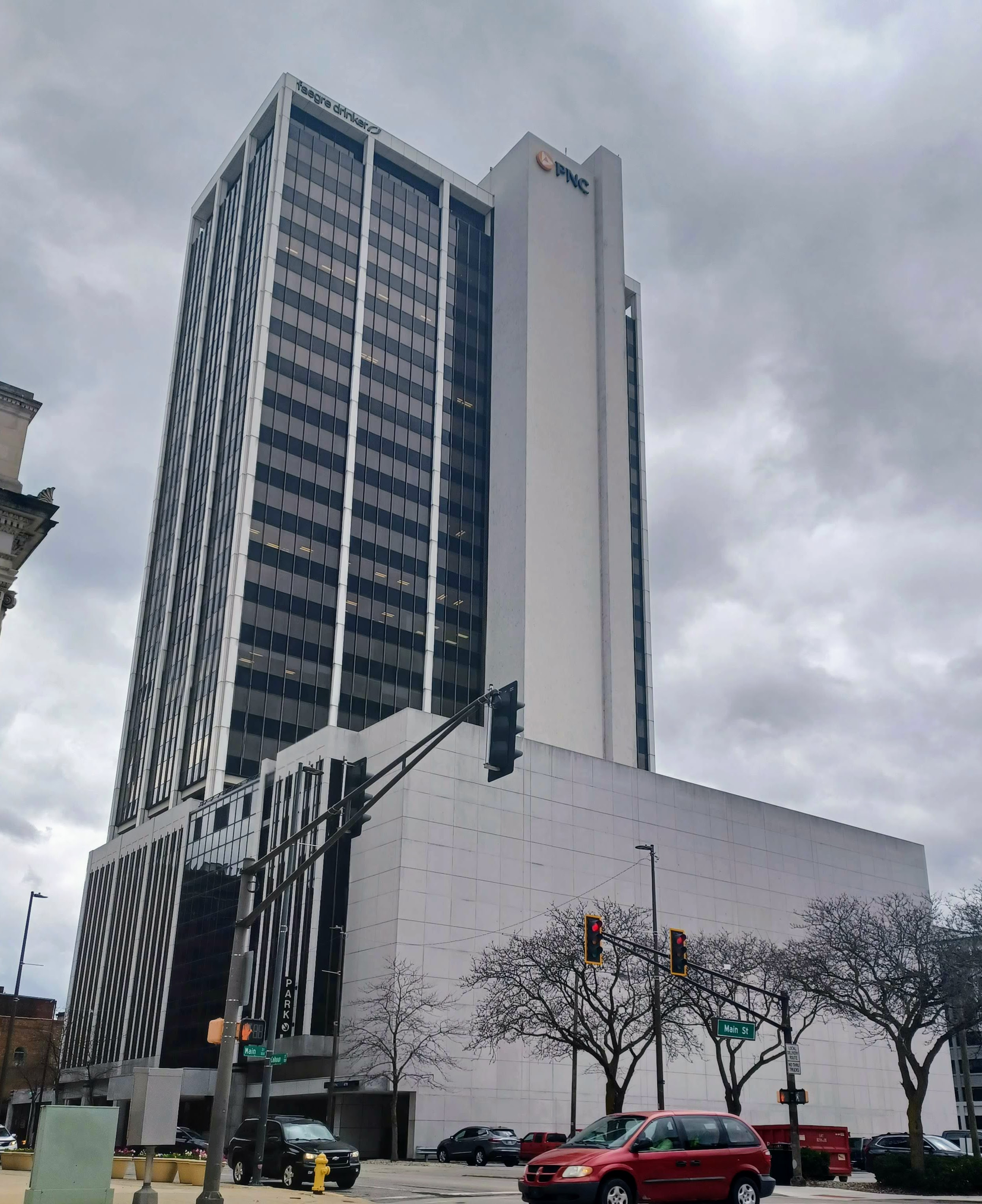
- PNC Center in 2024.
- Interactive map of the PNC Center area

General information
- Status: Completed
- Location: 110 West Berry Street Fort Wayne, IN
- Coordinates: 41.085556°N 85.140278°W
- Construction started: 1969
- Construction stopped: 1970

Height
- Height: 339 feet (103m)

Design and construction
- Architects: Kelly & Marshall

Website
- www.svnparkegroup.com/locations/pnc-center

The PNC Center, previously known as Fort Wayne National Bank Building and the National City Center is the second tallest office building in Fort Wayne, Indiana.

== History ==
The 26-story Fort Wayne National Bank Building was built during 1969 but a series of work strikes caused delays. The general contractor was changed and the building opened in 1970. The building was owned by an Oklahoma company, Transamaerica Investment Group. It was designed to be a bank and office building. The developer was also an Oklahoma company, Kelly Marshall & Associates.

The office building previously stood as Fort Wayne's tallest building for 12 years (1970–1982) before being surpassed by the Indiana Michigan Power Center.

== See also ==
- List of tallest buildings in Fort Wayne
- List of tallest buildings in Indiana
