= List of tallest buildings in Fort Wayne =

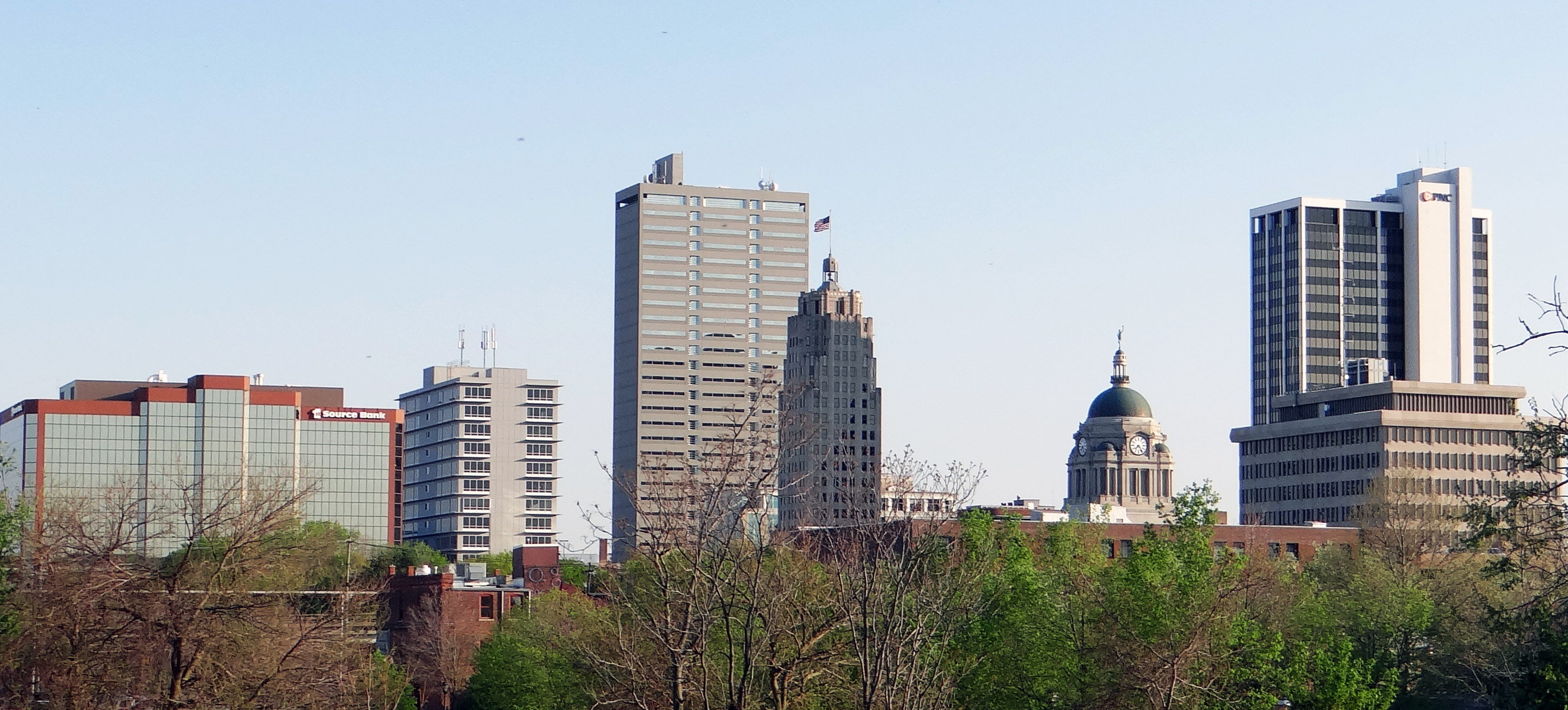
Skyline of Fort Wayne (2014).

From 1930 to 1962, Fort Wayne, Indiana, was home to the tallest building in Indiana—the Lincoln Bank Tower. Today, the tallest building in the city is the 27-story Indiana Michigan Power Center, which rises 442 feet (135 m) and was completed in 1982. This building stands as the fourth-tallest in Indiana and the tallest outside Indianapolis. It is also the tallest reinforced concrete building in Indiana. The city's second-tallest building is the PNC Center, which rises 339 feet (103 m). Of the 40 tallest buildings in Indiana, three are located in Fort Wayne. As of May 2015, there are two completed skyscrapers and ten completed high-rises in the city, with one under construction.

== Tallest buildings ==
This list ranks buildings in Fort Wayne that stand at least 150 feet (46 m) tall, based on standard height measurement. This includes spires and architectural details but does not include antenna masts. An equal sign (=) following a rank indicates the same height between two or more buildings. The "Year" column indicates the year in which a building was completed.

Rank	Name	Height ft / m	Image	Floors	Year	Notes
1	Indiana Michigan Power Center	442 feet (135 m)		27	1982	Tallest building in Fort Wayne since 1982, fourth-tallest building in Indiana, and tallest outside of Indianapolis. Formerly known as One Summit Square. Headquarters of Indiana Michigan Power; headquarters for SIRVA moving division; regional headquarters for JPMorgan Chase and predecessor banks.
2	PNC Center	339 feet (103 m)		26	1970	Tallest building in Fort Wayne from 1970 to 1982, currently the 11th tallest building in the state of Indiana. Formerly known as Fort Wayne National Bank Building and National City Center. Regional headquarters for PNC Bank and predecessor banks; home to Fort Wayne offices for Faegre Baker Daniels. Was home to headquarters for Central Soya prior to acquisition by Bunge.
3	Lincoln Bank Tower	312 feet (95 m)		22	1930	Tallest building in Fort Wayne from 1930 to 1970 and tallest building in Indiana from 1930 to 1962. Market headquarters for Old National Bank and predecessor Tower Bank. Originally built for Lincoln National Bank; successor Norwest Bank, which took over Lincoln in 1992, had offices here until 1995.
4	Allen County Courthouse	238 feet (73 m)		3	1902	Listed to the National Register of Historic Places in 1976, later recognized as a National Historic Landmark in 2003.
5	First Presbyterian Church	220 feet (67 m)		3	1950	
6	Saint Paul's Evangelical Lutheran Church	214 feet (65 m)		2	1889	Listed to the National Register of Historic Places in 1982.
7	St. Peter's Catholic Church	211 feet (64 m)		2	1892	Listed to the National Register of Historic Places in 1991.
8	Zion Evangelical Lutheran Church	210 feet (64 m)		2	1891	
9	Cathedral of the Immaculate Conception	192 feet (59 m)		2	1860	Oldest standing religious structure in the city, listed to the National Register of Historic Places in 1980.
10	Trinity English Lutheran Church	179 feet (55 m)		2	1923	
11	STAR Building	172 feet (52 m)		13	1923	Headquarters of STAR Financial Group. Also known as the Commerce Building from 1970 to 1999 and the Fort Wayne National Bank Building from 1923 to 1970.
12	First Federal Bank Center at the Anthony Wayne Building	167 feet (51 m)		15	1964	Mixed-use building that is home to market headquarters for First Federal Bank of the Midwest, condominiums, regional offices for U.S. Senator Mike Braun, and The Hoppy Gnome/Gnometown Brewing brewpub. Was headquarters of Anthony Wayne Bank prior to 1985; successor banks continued to use the building for offices until JPMorgan Chase in the mid-2000s.
13	Skyline Tower	164 feet (50 m)		12	2018	Second-tallest mixed use condominium/office building in Fort Wayne. First floor is occupied by Ruth's Chris Steak House; second floor is market headquarters for First Merchants Bank (predecessor bank iAB Financial Bank never had a downtown Fort Wayne presence).
14	1st Source Center	149 feet (45 m)		10	1989	An office building, containing mainly commercial offices. It has 4 floors of indoor parking.

== Tallest under construction, approved and proposed ==
This lists high-rises that are under construction, approved or proposed in Fort Wayne and planned to rise at least 150 feet (46 m) in height, but are not yet completed. A floor count of 15 stories is used as the cutoff in place of a height of 200 feet (61 m) for buildings whose heights have not yet been released by their developers.

Currently, there are no high-rises over 150 feet planned in Fort Wayne.

== Timeline of tallest buildings ==
This lists buildings that once held the title of tallest building in Fort Wayne.

Name	Street address	Years as tallest	Height ft / m	Floors
Cathedral of the Immaculate Conception	1122 South Clinton Street	1860–1887	192 / 59	2
Saint Mary's Catholic Church^{[A]}	1101 Lafayette Street	1887–1902	237 / 69	
Allen County Courthouse	715 South Calhoun Street	1902–1930	237 / 73	3
Lincoln Bank Tower	116 East Berry Street	1930–1970	312 / 95	22
Fort Wayne National Bank Building^{[B]}	110 West Berry Street	1970–1982	339 / 103	26
One Summit Square^{[C]}	911 South Calhoun Street	1982–present	442 / 135	27

== Notes ==
A. This building was destroyed in 1993 by fire ignited from a lightning strike.
B. This building was constructed as the Fort Wayne National Bank Building, but has since been renamed PNC Center.
C. This building was constructed as One Summit Square, but has since been renamed Indiana Michigan Power Center.
