= Lincoln Bank Tower =

High-rise office building in Fort Wayne, Indiana, U.S.

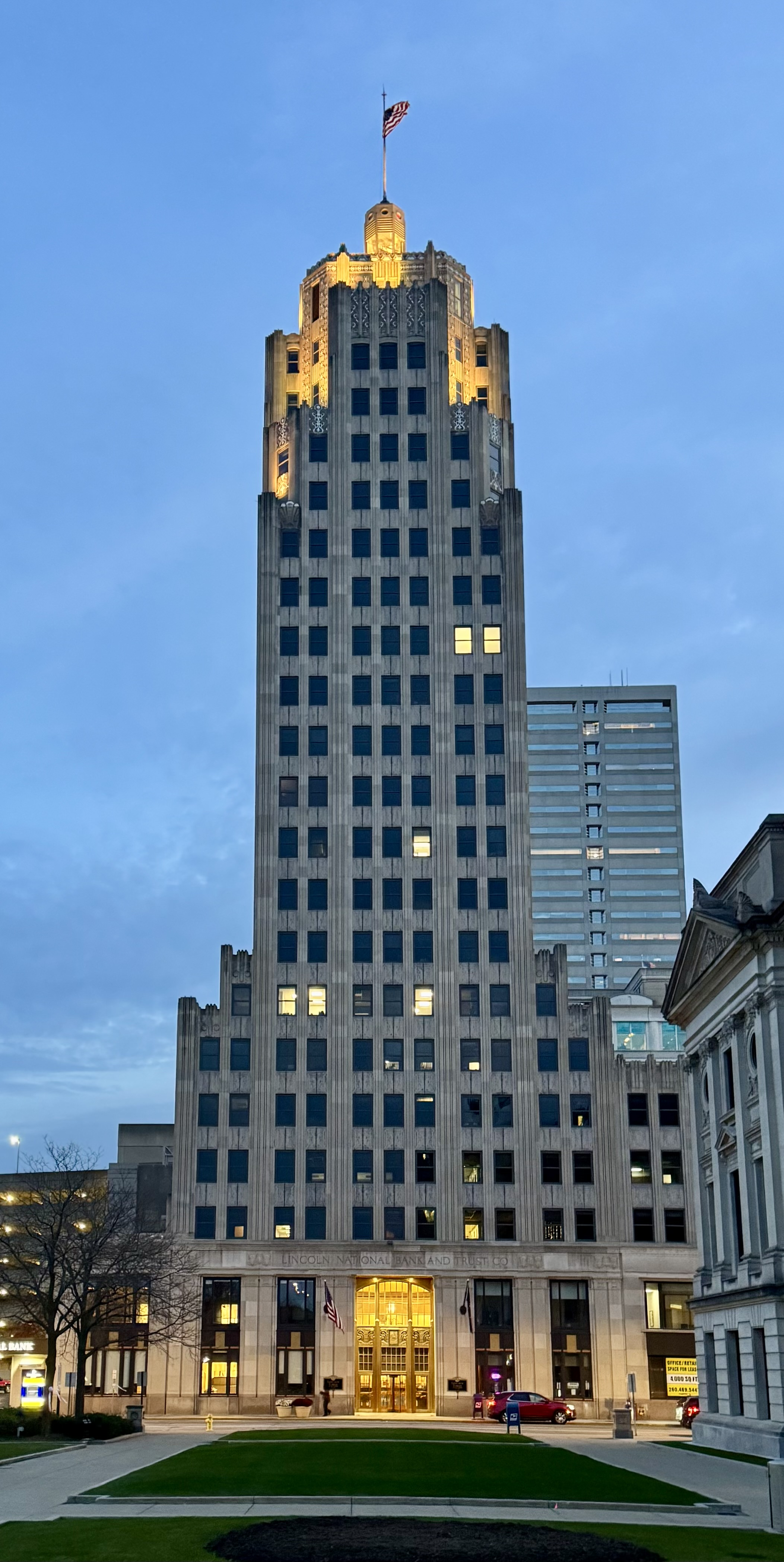
- Interactive map of the Lincoln Bank Tower area

General information
- Type: Office
- Location: 116 East Berry Street, Fort Wayne, Indiana, United States
- Coordinates: 41°4′45.23″N 85°8′19.67″W
- Completed: 1930

Height
- Roof: 312 feet (95 m)

Technical details
- Floor count: 22

Design and construction
- Architect: Alvin M. Strauss

The Lincoln Bank Tower in Fort Wayne, Indiana, United States, is an Art Deco highrise building. Construction started in late 1929 with the building's opening on November 16, 1930. For decades, it was the tallest building in the state. The building was also known as "Lincoln Bank Tower" to distinguish it from the building at 215 Berry Street, which had been known as the "Lincoln Life Building" from 1912 until 1923. Today, the other building is commonly known by its original name, the Elektron Building.

== History ==
Lincoln National Bank and Trust was chartered as The German American National Bank in 1905. Due to anti-German sentiment that arose from World War I, the German American National Bank became Lincoln National Bank on May 31, 1918.

The choice of Lincoln as a name was appealing. Not only was it a very American name, the thriving Lincoln National Life Insurance Company—also founded in 1905—was down the street. People were still excited about the Lincoln Highway (the main street of America) that passed through Fort Wayne to be the first coast-to-coast highway in the United States. In 1928, Lincoln National Bank merged with Lincoln Trust Company (formerly known as Strauss Brothers Commercial Bank) to become Lincoln National Bank and Trust.

Shortly after Lincoln National Bank and Trust was formed, President Charles Buesching commissioned a skyscraper to serve as headquarters for the new bank. Buesching considered it to be a monument to the German immigrants who settled the Fort Wayne area at the turn of the 20th century and formed the backbone of his investors, depositors, and customers. Buesching himself was a German immigrant.

Alvin M. Strauss of Fort Wayne was architect, while Buesching and Hagerman were contractors for the building. Some design elements were based on the Tribune Tower in Chicago. Ground was broken on August 16, 1929, for the building. Despite the Great Crash of the stock market on October 24, construction continued on the $1.3 million structure.

It was the tallest building of any kind in the state until 1962 and the tallest in Fort Wayne until the Fort Wayne National Bank Building (known as National City Center from 1999 to 2009 and as PNC Center since 2009) was built in 1970.

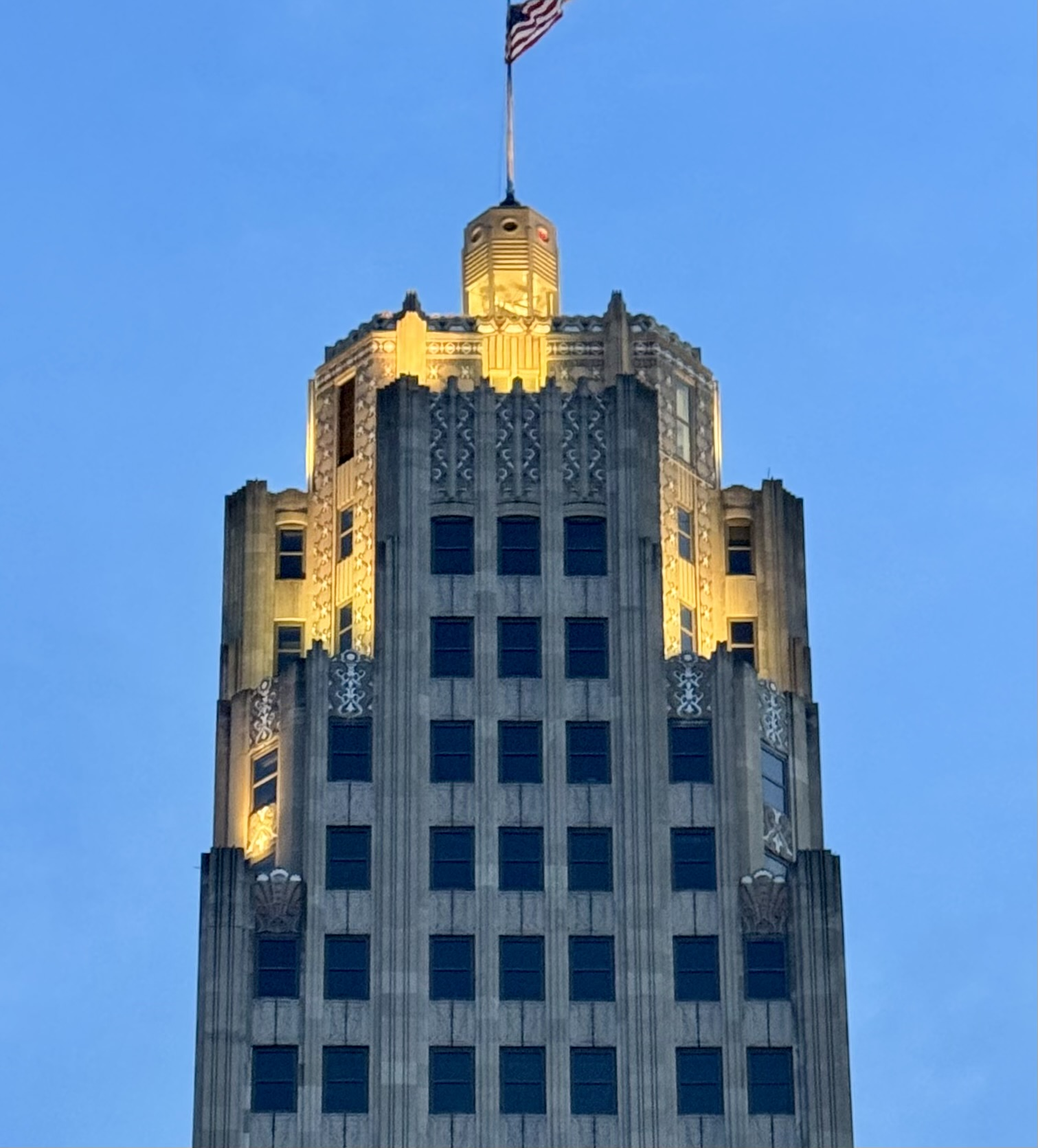
Art Deco finial and ornamentation on the Lincoln Bank Tower

In 1995, the former Lincoln National Bank and Trust, by then part of Norwest Bank, moved into new facilities at Norwest City Center (now known as Wells Fargo Indiana Center). Lincoln Tower was 60% vacant after this move. In 1997, Lincoln Tower was sold at a sheriff's sale. There had been a $2 million default on the mortgage of a building that originally cost $1.3 million to build. In 1998, Tippmann Properties bought Lincoln Tower, and began to carefully refurbish it. A new bank, calling itself Tower Bank, announced it would open in Lincoln Tower, occupying the lobby and some office space. The new bank used a stylized gold version of the Lincoln Bank Tower as its corporate logo, which was designed by prominent Fort Wayne ad agency Boyden & Youngblutt.

Old National Bank acquired Tower Bank in April 2014 and made the Lincoln Bank Tower its Fort Wayne banking market headquarters. Old National also kept the Lincoln Bank Tower banking center and many of Tower's executives. It also retained Tower Private Advisors, the private banking arm of Tower Bank, along with the Lincoln Tower office, and merged it into Old National Wealth Management. Until 2016, Old National also maintained an insurance operation in Fort Wayne, located in Aboite Township. This division was sold and rebranded as ONI Risk Partners.

In 1996, this building was the backdrop in several scenes of In the Company of Men, a film written and directed by Neil LaBute. The main bank lobby was the setting of the final shot. The apartment shown at the end of the movie was the room that is used as the deli in the main lobby. Other scenes were filmed in restrooms and various office spaces throughout the building, including a shot from the roof overlooking the Allen County Courthouse. Twenty years later, Old National Bank and its advertising agency Publicis filmed portions of a television commercial in the bank's lobby. This commercial was aired throughout Old National's market footprint, including to introduce the bank to Wisconsin after the acquisition of a bank in that state.

== Building details ==
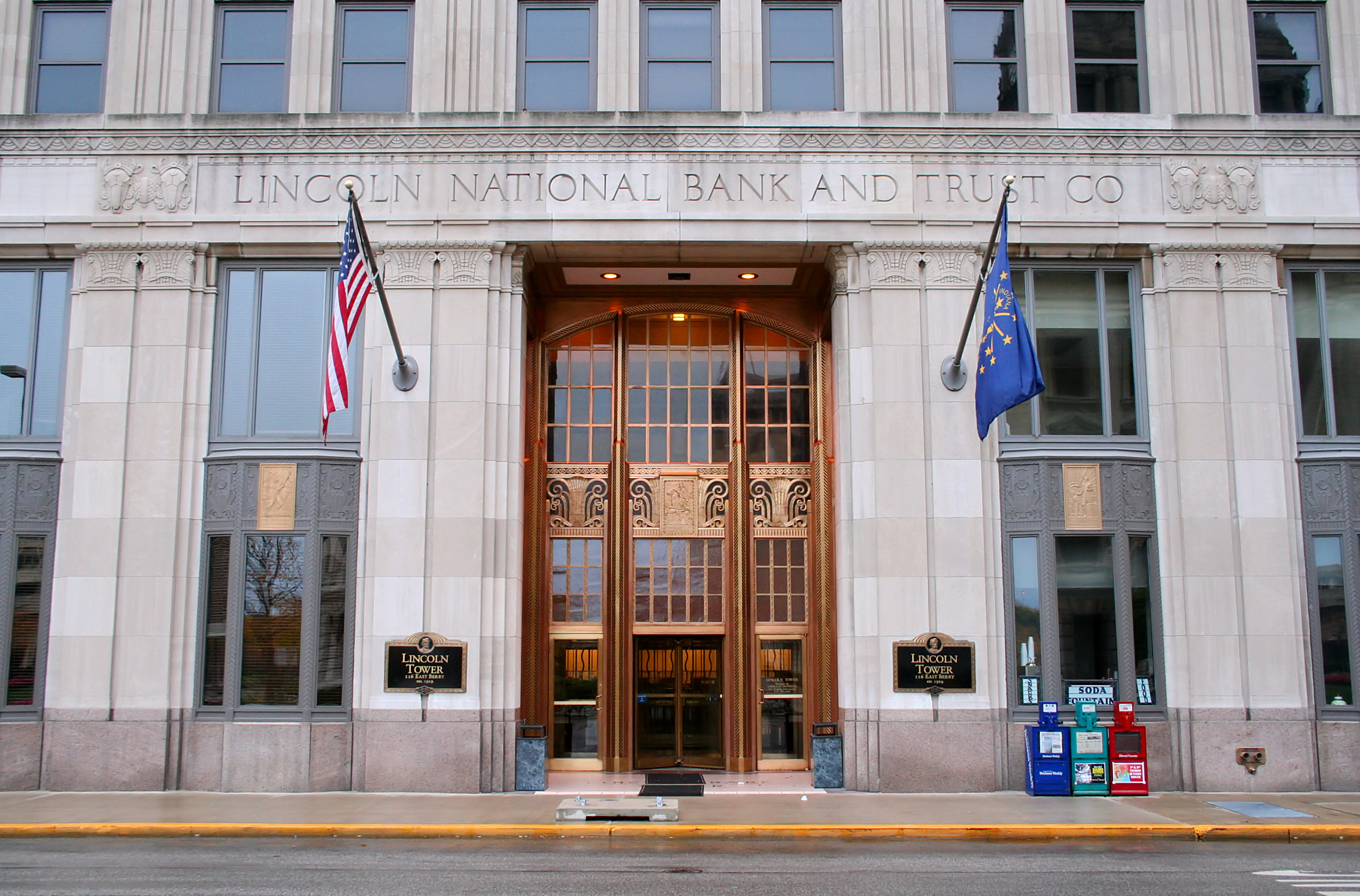
Lincoln Bank Tower entrance detail

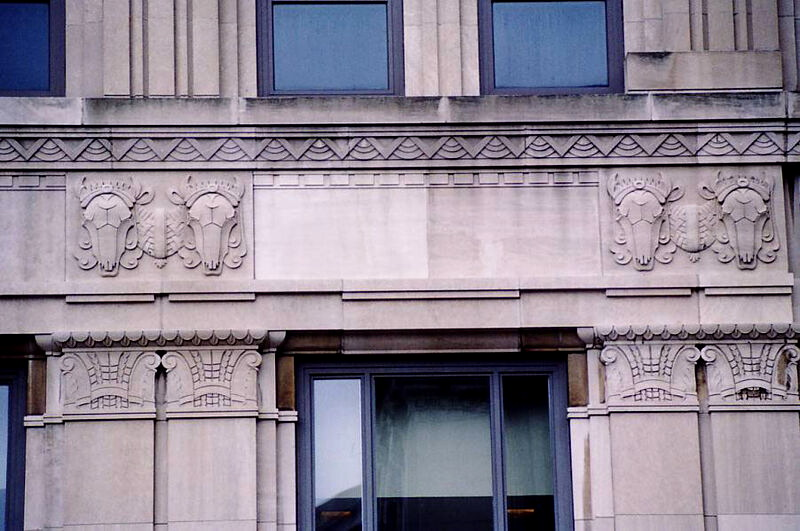
Art Deco-styled mascarons in the form of bucranium on a frieze above the first floor of the Tower

The building is constructed of 1,774 tons of structural steel, faced with 21,250 cubic feet of cut Indiana limestone and granite with gold highlights. It features lead spandrel panels, a 58-ton terra-cotta crown, and 500 tons of marble. Capping the building is a slender observation tower topped by a flagpole.

Seven bronze panels at the main entrance depict scenes from the life of President Abraham Lincoln. Between the entrance and the lobby is a snack shop with the original 1930 soda fountain, still in use. The main banking lobby is 85 feet (26 m) wide, 110 feet (34 m) long, and two stories tall. It contains large art deco murals depicting the industries and the seasons, using symbolism from Greek and Egyptian traditions, such as a female form to represent fecundity and the sun to represent energy. Materials include hand-wrought bronze, Milford granite, Italian Travertine marble, several rare types of green Vermont marble, and Indiana limestone.

== See also ==
- List of tallest buildings in Fort Wayne
- List of tallest buildings in Indiana
- List of Art Deco architecture in Indiana
