= Ohio District of the Lutheran Church – Missouri Synod =

Subdivision of Christian denomination in the U.S.

Ohio District of the LCMS

Location
- Country: United States
- Territory: Ohio, West Virginia, and northeastern Kentucky
- Headquarters: Olmsted Falls, Ohio

Statistics
- Congregations: 167
- Schools: 39 preschool; 19 elementary; 2 secondary
- Members: 54,576

Information
- Denomination: Lutheran Church – Missouri Synod
- Established: 1963

Current leadership
- President: Rev. Dr. Kevin Wilson

Map
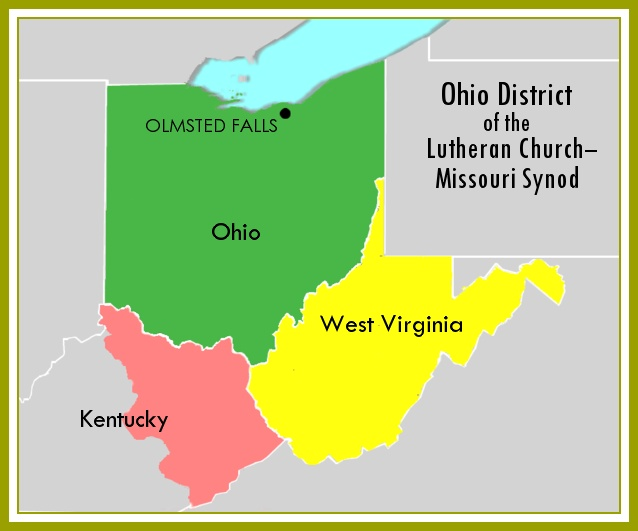

Website
- www.oh.lcms.org

The Ohio District is one of the 35 districts of the Lutheran Church – Missouri Synod (LCMS), and covers the states of Ohio and West Virginia, as well as north eastern Kentucky (the remainder of Kentucky is divided between the Indiana District and the Mid-South District). In addition, sixteen Ohio congregations are in the non-geographic English District, and eleven are in the SELC District. The Ohio District comprises 167 congregations and missions, subdivided into 16 circuits, as well as 39 preschools, 19 elementary schools, and 2 high schools. Baptized membership in Ohio District congregations is approximately 54,576.

The Ohio District was formed in 1963 when the Central District was divided, also creating the Indiana District. District offices are located in Olmsted Falls, Ohio, just west of Cleveland. Delegates from each congregation meet in convention every three years to elect the district president, vice presidents, circuit counselors, a board of directors, and other officers. Rev. Dr. Kevin Wilson became the district president in September 2018.

== Presidents ==
- Rev. Ottomar Krueger, 1963–1966
- Rev. Paul G. Single, 1966–1969
- Rev. Edgar M. Luecke, 1969–1970
- Rev. Arthur H. Ziegler, 1970–1982
- Rev. Paul A. Weber, 1982–1988
- Rev. David D. Buegler, 1988–1996
- Rev. Ronald L. Bergen, 1996–2006
- Rev. Terry L. Cripe, 2006–2018
- Rev. Dr. Kevin Wilson, 2018–present
