= Alvin M. Strauss =

American architect

Alvin M. Strauss (1895 – 1958) was an Indiana architect and designer of many landmark buildings in Indiana and Ohio during the early twentieth century. He was born in Kendallville, Indiana, to German immigrants and later apprenticed under prominent architects in Chicago and Fort Wayne, Indiana. Strauss founded his own practice in Fort Wayne in 1918. Among his commissioned works are the Allen County War Memorial Coliseum, the Clyde Theatre, the Lincoln Bank Tower, and the Embassy Theatre and Indiana Hotel in Fort Wayne as well as the Brokaw Theatre in Angola, Indiana.

His works also include the 1930 Art Deco-style showroom and administrative buildings of the Auburn Cord Duesenberg Automobile Facility.

His collection is housed in the Drawings and Documents Archive at Ball State University.
