= Mid-South District of the Lutheran Church – Missouri Synod =

Subdivision of Christian denomination in the U.S.

Mid-South District of the LCMS

Location
- Country: United States
- Territory: Arkansas, Tennessee, and the southwestern corner of Kentucky
- Headquarters: Cordova, Tennessee

Statistics
- Congregations: 129
- Schools: 17 preschool; 14 elementary
- Members: 28,000

Information
- Denomination: Lutheran Church – Missouri Synod
- Established: 1966

Current leadership
- President: Rev. Roger Paavola

Website
- www.mid-southlcms.com

The Mid-South District is one of the 35 districts of the Lutheran Church – Missouri Synod (LCMS), and encompasses the states of Arkansas and Tennessee, as well as southwestern portions of Kentucky; the rest of Kentucky is divided between the Indiana District and the Ohio District. The Mid-South District includes approximately 129 congregations and mission stations, subdivided into 12 circuits, as has 17 preschools and 14 elementary schools. Baptized membership in district congregations is over 28,000.

The Mid-South District was formed in 1966 when the Western District was divided, also creating the Missouri District. District offices are located in Cordova, Tennessee, near Memphis. Delegates from each congregation meet in convention every three years to elect the district president, vice presidents, circuit counselors, a board of directors, and other officers. The Rev. Roger Paavola has been the district president since 2012.

== Presidents ==
- Rev. Wilbert E. Griesse, 1966–1985
- Rev. Norman L. Groteluschen, 1985–1991
- Rev. David W. Callies, 1991–2003
- Rev. Kenneth E. Lampe, 2003–2012
- Rev. Roger Paavola, 2012–Present
