= Auburn Cord Duesenberg Automobile Museum =

Museum in Auburn, Indiana

- Established: July 6, 1974; 52 years ago
- Accreditation: American Alliance of Museums
- Collections: Antique and Classic cars and related memorabilia
- Collection size: 120 classic cars, antique cars, special interest cars
- CEO: Brandon J. Anderson
- Owner: Auburn Automotive Heritage Inc.
- Website: Official website
- Auburn Cord Duesenberg Automobile Facility
- U.S. National Register of Historic Places
- U.S. National Historic Landmark District
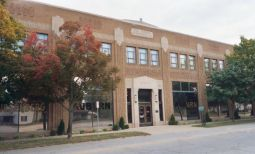
- Auburn Cord Duesenberg Automobile Facility

- Location within Indiana Location within the United States
- Location: Auburn, Indiana
- Coordinates: 41°21′21″N 85°3′26″W
- Built: 1930
- Architect: Alvin M. Strauss; Sheets Inc.
- Architectural style: Art Deco
- NRHP reference No.: 78000029

Significant dates
- Added to NRHP: September 21, 1978
- Designated NHLD: April 5, 2005

The Auburn Cord Duesenberg Automobile Museum is an automobile museum located in Auburn, Indiana, United States. Opened in 1974, it is dedicated to preserving cars built by Auburn Automobile, Cord Automobile, and Duesenberg Motors Company.

== Facility ==
The museum is located in the former administration building of the Auburn Automobile Company, which operated on this property from the early 20th century until its closure in 1937. The building, along with the adjacent service and new parts building, and the L-29 building now occupied by the National Auto & Truck Museum, were together declared a National Historic Landmark in 2005. This complex was recognized as one of the nation's best-preserved examples of an independent auto company's facilities. The showroom and administrative buildings were designed by architect Alvin M. Strauss in Art Deco style and were built in 1930. The Auburn Automobile Company had its genesis in a carriage manufacturer, and at its height had more than 18 acres (7.3 ha) of facilities here. After its closure, the administration building housed a business selling original and reproduction parts for a number of discontinued manufacturers, including the Auburn, Cord, and Duesenberg nameplates, until 1960.

== Exhibits and collections ==
The museum is organized into seven galleries that display over 120 cars and related exhibits such as restored Auburn Automobile company offices. Some exhibits have interactive kiosks that allow a visitor to hear the sounds the car makes and to see related videos and photographs that show the engineering that went into its design.

The museum exhibits a Stinson Junior airplane that was on display there when the building opened in 1930.

== See also ==
- America's Packard Museum – Automotive museum in Dayton, Ohio
- List of museums in Indiana
- List of National Historic Landmarks in Indiana
- National Register of Historic Places listings in DeKalb County, Indiana
- Studebaker National Museum – Museum in South Bend, Indiana, United States
