= Salesforce Tower (Indianapolis) =

Skyscraper in Indianapolis, Indiana, US

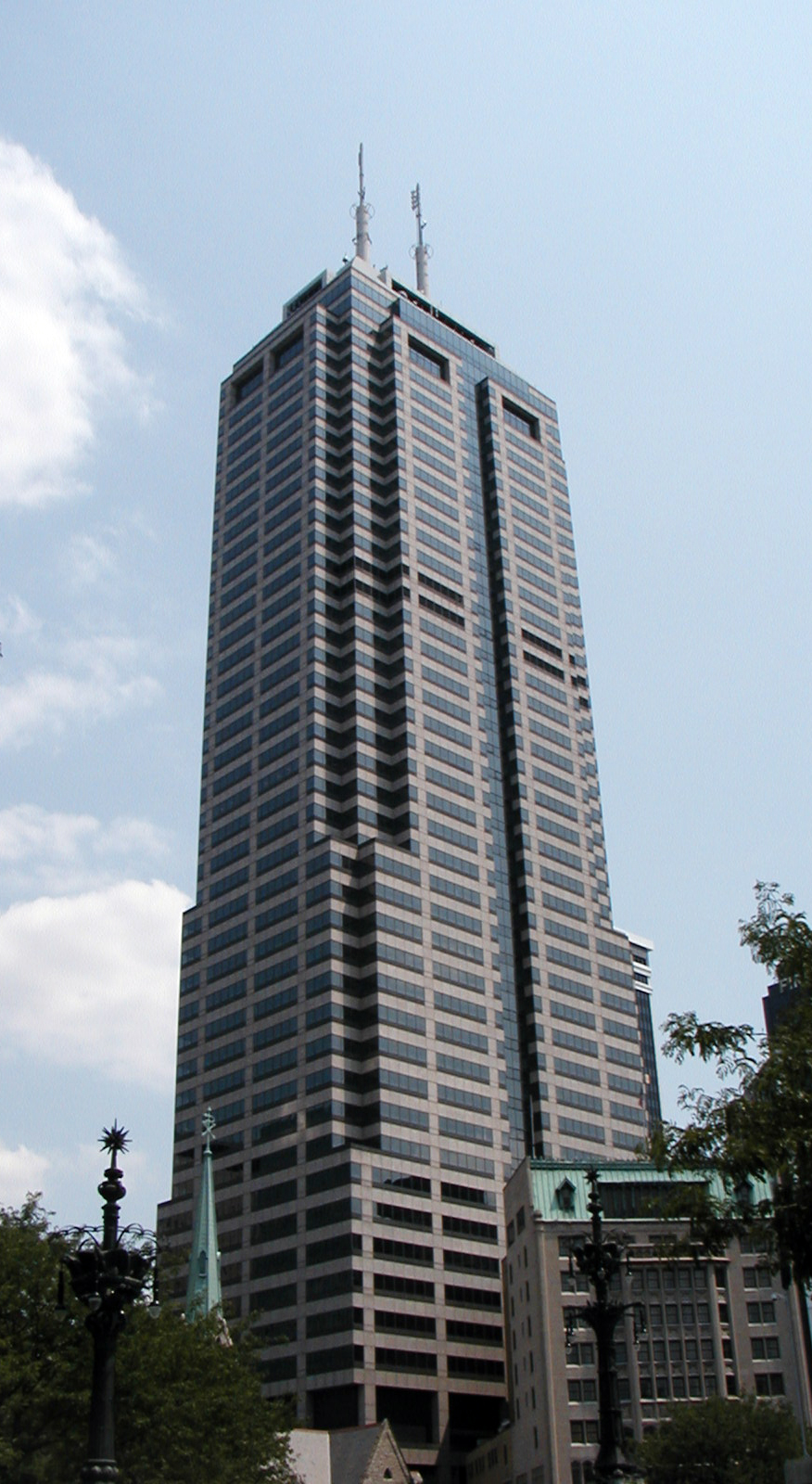
- Salesforce Tower in 2006
- Interactive map of the Salesforce Tower area
- Former names: Bank One Tower (1990–2004); Chase Tower (2005–2017)

General information
- Type: Office
- Location: 111 Monument Circle; Indianapolis, Indiana, United States
- Coordinates: 39°46′11″N 86°9′26″W
- Completed: 1990

Height
- Antenna spire: 811 ft (247 m)
- Roof: 701 ft (214 m)
- Top floor: 625 ft (191 m)

Technical details
- Floor count: 48
- Floor area: 905,158 sq ft (84,092 m^{2})
- Lifts/elevators: 31

Design and construction
- Architect: KlingStubbins
- Main contractor: Huber Hunt & Nichols

Website
- salesforcetowerindy.com

References
- "Chase Tower". SkyscraperPage.

Salesforce Tower (formerly known as Bank One Tower, then Chase Tower, and originally conceived as American Fletcher Tower) is the tallest building in the U.S. state of Indiana. Opening in 1990, it surpassed the AUL Tower, now OneAmerica Tower, in Indianapolis for the distinction. The building's twin spires' are 811 feet (247 m) tall, while the 48 floors of office and retail space and two building equipment floors above that peak at the 701-foot (214 m) roof. It is the regional headquarters of Salesforce, which moved into the tower in the late-2010s and currently occupies a large amount of space in the building. While the tower has two spires of equal height, only one of them is functional as a transmission antenna. The other mast is merely an architectural decoration. The building was designed by KlingStubbins, and built by Indianapolis-based Huber Hunt & Nichols.

The tower's step pyramidal cap reflects the design of the Indiana War Memorial, three blocks due north. The War Memorial, in turn, reflects the descriptions of the original Mausoleum. Because of the height of this building, its roof was specifically designed to house communications relay equipment, in order to provide additional revenue to the building's owners. Over the past several years, two large banners have occasionally been placed outside the north and south communication bullpen areas of the roof in support of two of the city's professional sports franchises. These "Go Pacers" and "Go Colts" signs are highly visible being on the tallest structure in the city.

== Background and history ==
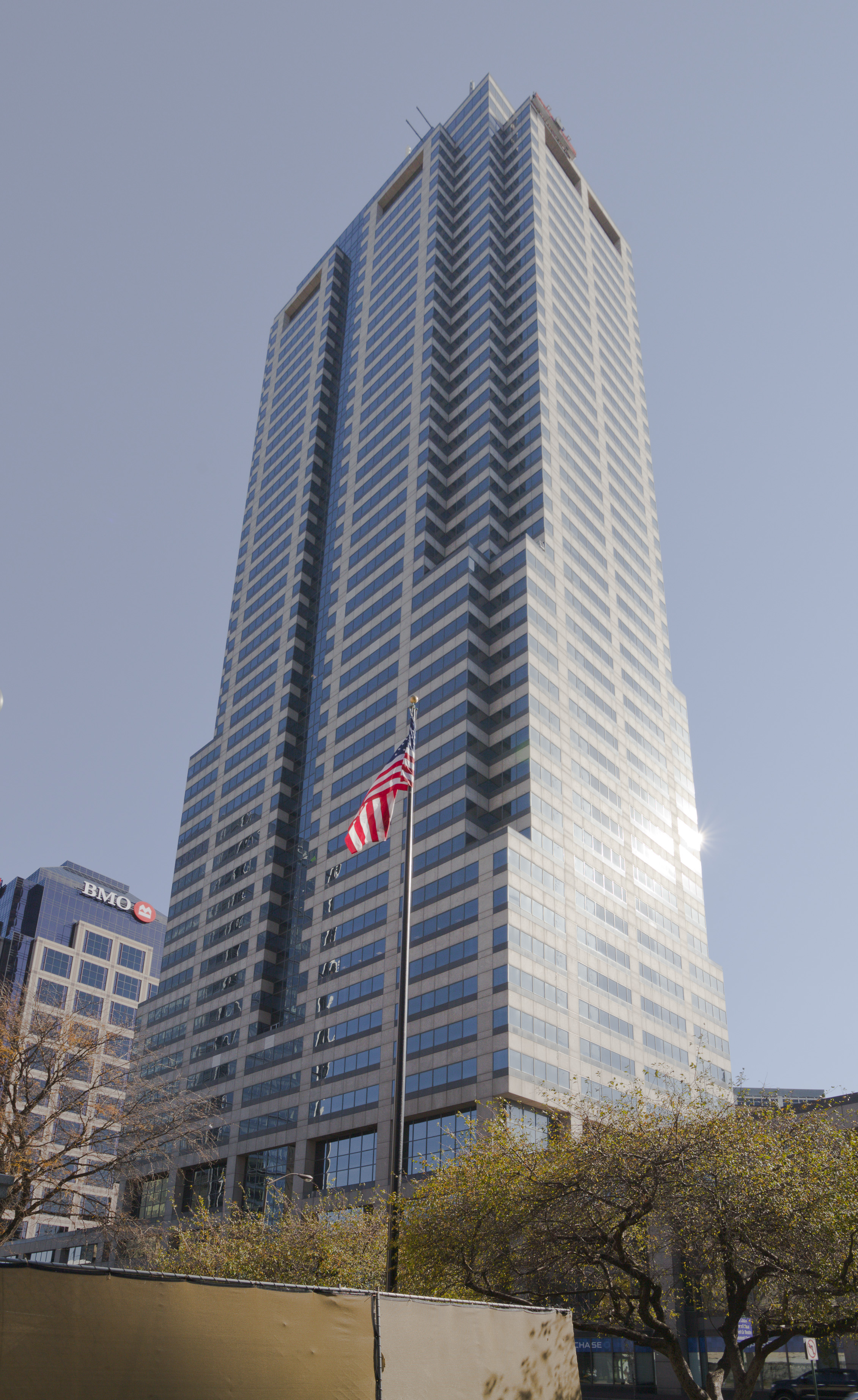
Salesforce Tower in October 2012

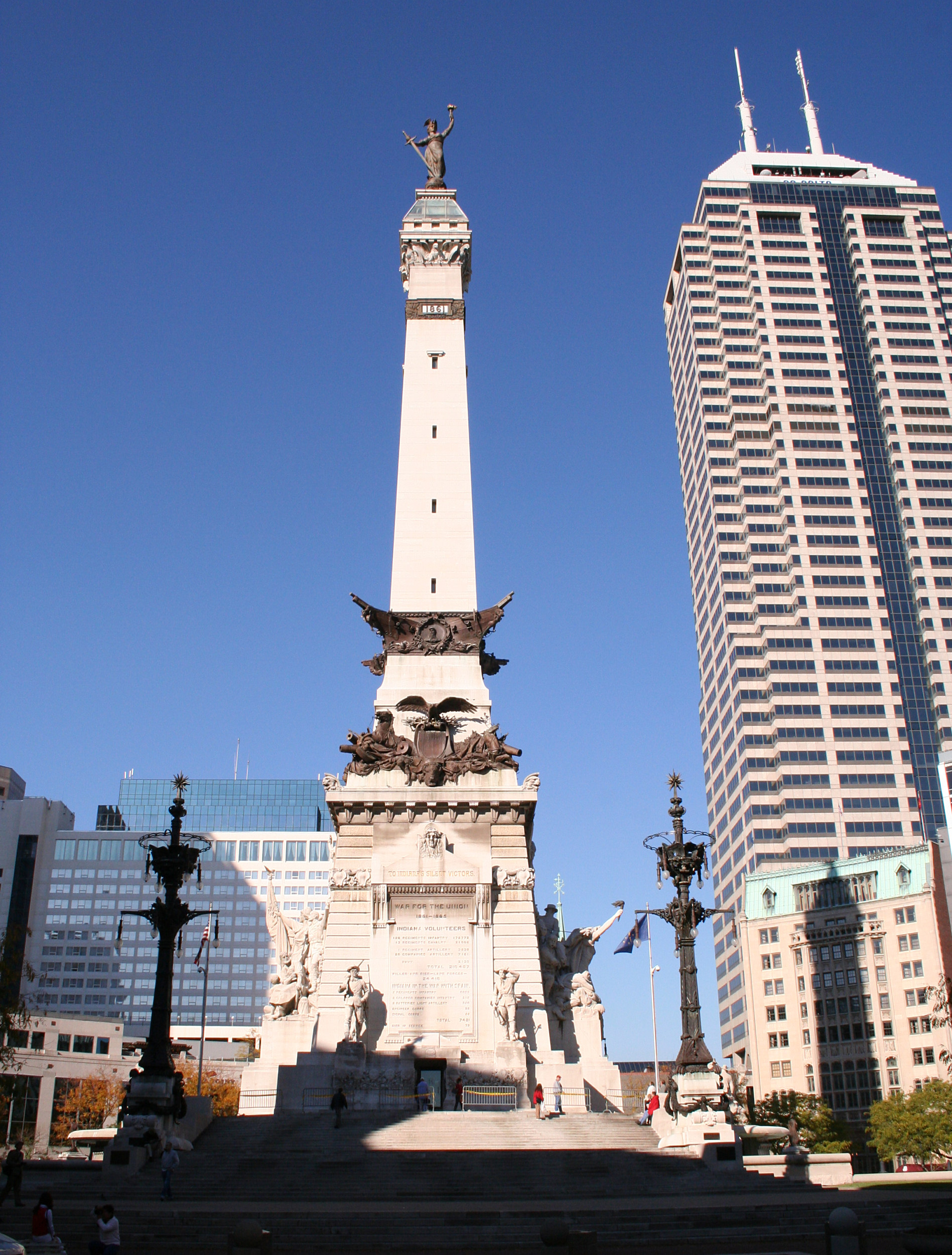
Salesforce Tower seen behind Soldiers' and Sailors' Monument in October 2009

The tower was originally conceived in the late 1970s by Frank E. McKinney Jr., chairman of American Fletcher Corporation, the holding company for American Fletcher National Bank and Trust Company (AFNB), which at the time was Indiana's largest financial institution, to allow for consolidation and expansion of his company's headquarters. Land was slowly being assembled for the building, with several predecessor structures along Ohio Street and Pennsylvania Street being demolished in those years and the early 1980s to clear the way for what McKinney hoped would soon be Indiana's tallest office tower.

Before construction of the building began, American Fletcher became the first major Indianapolis bank holding company to be sold to an out-of-state financial institution, agreeing in the spring of 1986 to merge with Ohio's rapidly growing Banc One Corporation. Upon consummation of that merger, Mr. McKinney became chairman of Bank One's Indiana operations and tower planning picked up momentum. Ground was broken and construction began in June 1987 on the newly designated Bank One Center Tower which was to be integrated with AFNB's existing headquarters complex on Monument Circle and adjacent Market Street.

This was done mainly to secure the prestigious Monument Circle address for the new tower, which rises between Ohio Street and Wabash Street (the east–west alley between Market and Ohio). Thus, the Ohio Street entrance to the tower is the complex's back door with a concourse-style passageway on the second level running over Scioto Street (the north–south alley between Pennsylvania and Meridian) to connect the skyscraper (and its attached parking garage along Pennsylvania Street) to the main entrance in the original 1960 American National Bank Building at 111 Monument Circle.

A separate skywalk across Scioto once connected the Circle Building to the adjacent Fletcher Trust Building at 10 E. Market Street, but that was later removed after the bank moved all operations formerly located in that structure into the new tower. The Fletcher Trust Building itself was subsequently sold and has since been renovated into a Hilton Garden Inn hotel. Banc One Corporation (later renamed Bank One Corporation) went through several additional major acquisitions before it was itself bought by J.P. Morgan Chase in the early 2000s. Upon consummation of that merger, the Indianapolis structure was renamed to become known as the Chase Tower, but Chase was not allowed to attach its name and logo to the top of the building until 2013 after the building changed owners.

On May 6, 2016, Salesforce announced plans to lease hundreds of thousands of square feet in the building and start moving employees there in early 2017. The building has since been rebranded as Salesforce Tower Indianapolis.

== Observation deck ==
The tower has no official observation deck. However, views of Monument Circle and the immediate downtown area can be seen from floors 2 and 7 in the common areas on the Circle side of the complex. In 2017, electronic turnstiles were implemented in the tower as a security measure. In turn, the elevators are no longer accessible by the public. However, Visitors Passes can be attained from the Security Desk in both the Circle and Tower-side lobbies. The tower can be seen from various spots around greater Indianapolis.

== See also ==
- List of tallest buildings in the United States
- List of tallest buildings by U.S. state
- List of tallest buildings in Indianapolis
- List of tallest buildings in Indiana

== Notes ==
Preceded by AUL Tower	Tallest Building in Indianapolis; 1990—Present; 247 m	Succeeded by None
