= Indiana District of the Lutheran Church – Missouri Synod =

Subdivision of Christian denomination in the U.S.

Indiana District of the LCMS
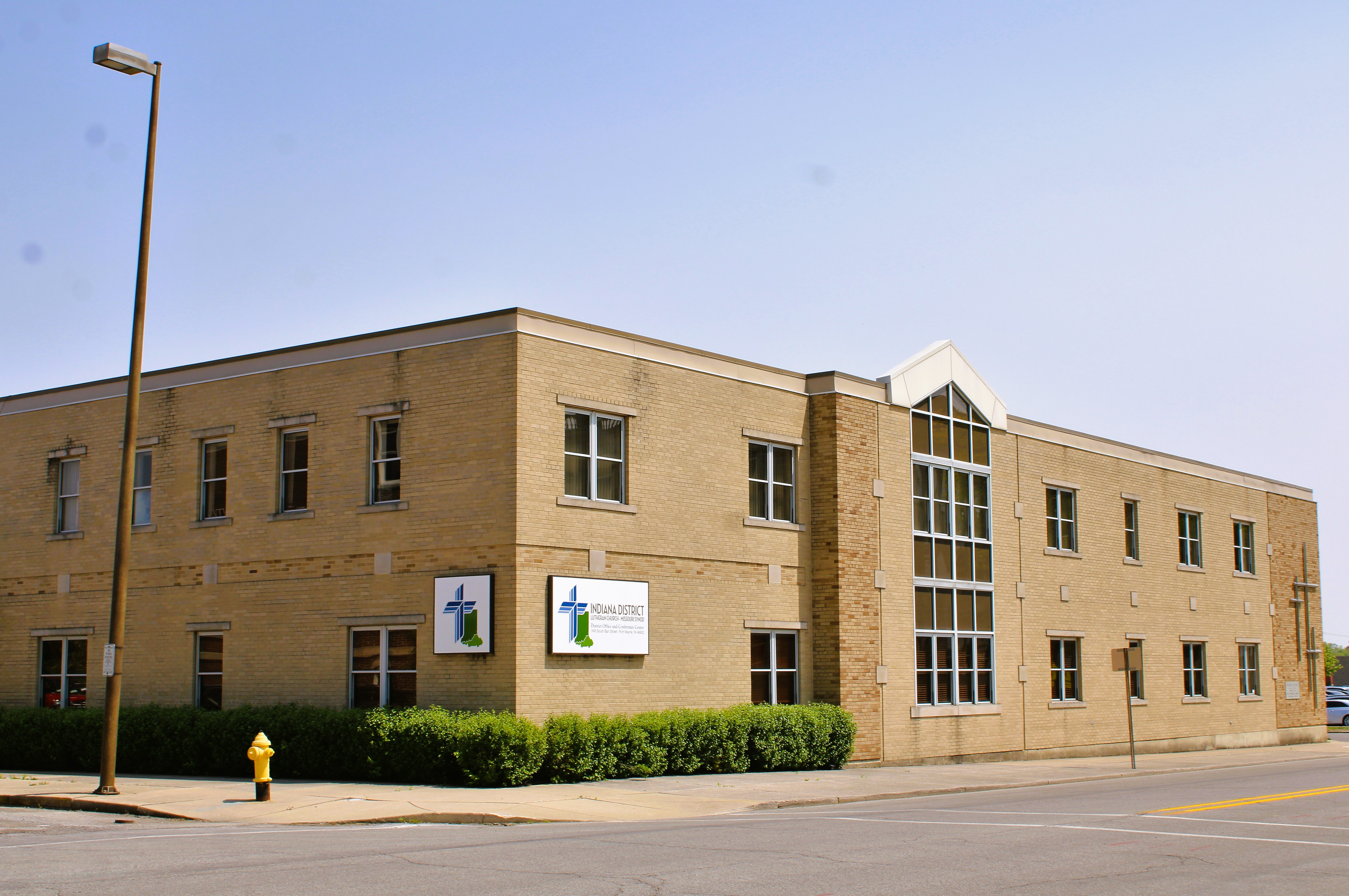
- District offices in Fort Wayne

Location
- Country: United States
- Territory: Indiana & part of Kentucky
- Headquarters: Concordia Theological Seminary; Fort Wayne, Indiana

Statistics
- Congregations: 234
- Schools: 53 preschool; 49 elementary; 3 secondary
- Members: 102,000

Information
- Denomination: Lutheran Church – Missouri Synod
- Established: 1963

Current leadership
- President: D. Richard Stuckwisch

Website
- www.in.lcms.org

The Indiana District is one of the 35 districts of the Lutheran Church – Missouri Synod (LCMS), encompassing the state of Indiana and most of western Kentucky; the remainder of Kentucky is divided between the Mid-South District and the Ohio District. However, one Kentucky congregation and ten Indiana congregations are in the non-geographic English District, and two congregations in Lake County are in the SELC District. The Indiana District is home to Concordia Theological Seminary in Fort Wayne, Indiana, and includes approximately 236 congregations and missions, subdivided into 24 circuits, as well as 53 preschools, 49 elementary schools, and 3 high schools. Baptized membership in district congregations is approximately 102,000.

The Indiana District was formed in 1963 when the Central District of the LCMS was divided, also creating the Ohio District. District offices are located in Fort Wayne. Delegates from each congregation meet in convention every three years to elect the district president, vice presidents, circuit counselors, a board of directors, and other officers. D. Richard Stuckwisch was elected at the district convention on July 23–24, 2022, and was installed on September 6.

== Presidents ==
- Edgar C. Rakow, 1963–1970
- Elwood H. Zimmermann, 1970–1988
- Reuben Garber, 1988–1991
- Timothy E. Sims, 1991–2003
- Daniel P. May, 2003–2018
- Daniel J. Brege, 2018–2022
- D. Richard Stuckwisch, 2022–present

== Notable churches ==
- Saint Paul's Evangelical Lutheran Church in Fort Wayne, Indiana, was founded in 1837 and is the oldest church in the district and the second-oldest Lutheran church in Indiana. The current building was erected in 1889 and added to the National Register of Historic Places in 1982. The congregation's school, also founded in 1837, is the oldest school in continuous operation in the state of Indiana.
- St. John's Lutheran Church in Dearborn County, Indiana, was founded in 1843 and added to the National Register of Historic Places in 1996.
- Saint James Lutheran Church in Lafayette, Indiana, was founded in 1850.
- Immanuel Lutheran Church in Valparaiso, Indiana, was founded in 1864. Its church building was erected in 1891 and was severely damaged by fire in 1975. The congregation relocated to a new building, while some members formed a new congregation, Heritage Lutheran Church, and restored the building. The building was added to the National Register of Historic Places in 1982.
