= OneAmerica Financial Partners =

American financial services company

OneAmerica Financial
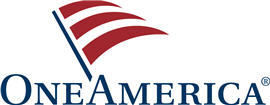

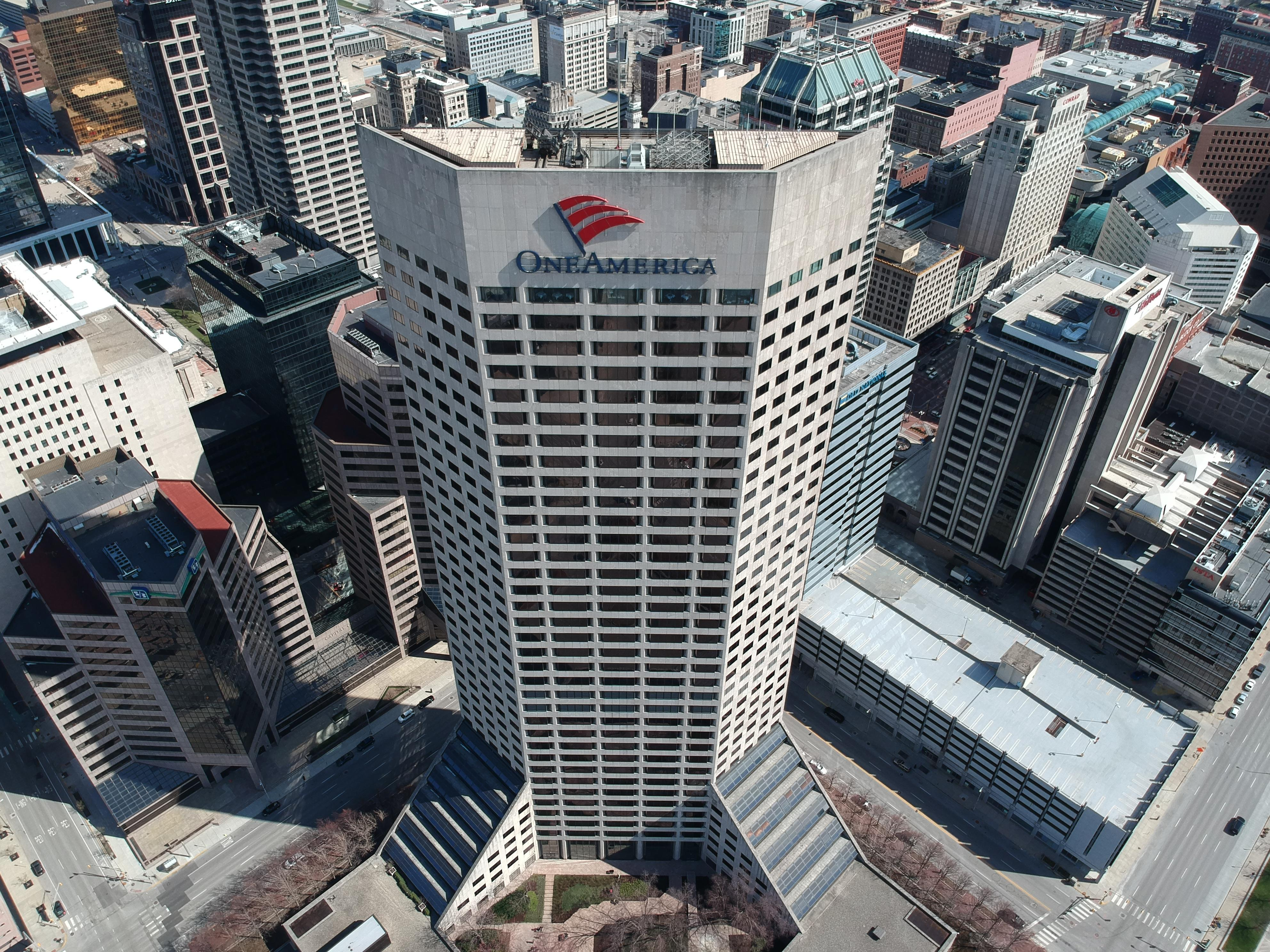
- Type: Mutual organization
- Industry: Financial services, Insurance
- Founded: 1877; 149 years ago
- Headquarters: Indianapolis, Indiana, United States
- Key people: J. Scott Davison, CEO
- Products: Life insurance
- Revenue: $2.06 billion USD (2016)
- Net income: $117.8 million USD (2016)
- Total assets: $74.1 billion USD (2016)
- Number of employees: 2,500 (2024)
- Divisions: American United Life Insurance Company · State Life Insurance Company · OneAmerica Retirement Services, LLC · McCready and Keene, Inc. · OneAmerica Securities, Inc. · Pioneer Mutual Life Insurance Company · OneAmerica Asset Management, LLC · AUL Reinsurance Management Services, LLC
- Website: oneamerica.com

OneAmerica Financial Partners, Inc., doing business as OneAmerica Financial, is an American financial services mutual holding organization with corporate offices at the OneAmerica Tower in Indianapolis, Indiana, U.S.

Its eight operating companies offer individual life, disability, and long-term care insurance, and annuities. For businesses, they offer employee benefits, retirement plans, and group insurance. They operate throughout the United States except in New York. OneAmerica Companies maintain "superior" financial ratings from A.M. Best and Standard and Poor's.

== History ==
Started as a life insurance group in 1877 by the Knights of Pythias, it became American Central Life Insurance Company in 1899. In 1904, American Central Life Insurance Company established its Reinsurance Division, which as of 2015 is the oldest life reinsurance company in the U.S. In 1930, Knights of Pythias separated the insurance program, creating United Mutual Life Insurance Company Inc. Then, in 1936, American Central and United Mutual merged to form American United Life Insurance Company (AUL).

In 1957, American United Life Insurance Company started posting puns and funny sayings on a signboard in downtown Indianapolis, a tradition that has continued to the present.

In 1982, AUL moved into the AUL Tower, the tallest building completed in Indianapolis at the time. A longtime supporter of downtown Indianapolis redevelopment, OneAmerica was an investor in Circle Centre Mall.

In 1994, State Life Insurance Company formed a strategic alliance with AUL. In 1998, Pioneer Mutual Life Insurance Company joined the AUL/State Life Insurance Company affiliation. In 2000, AUL reorganized to form American United Mutual Insurance Holding Company and OneAmerica Financial Partners, Inc.

In 2010, OneAmerica purchased McCready and Keene, Inc. In 2014, OneAmerica purchased City National Bank's retirement services division.

In 2015, OneAmerica purchased Bank of Montreal's BMO Retirement Services.

In 2024, OneAmerica announced a "brand refresh", including an updated logo and the company's first national advertising campaign doing business as OneAmerica Financial.

== Company leadership ==
=== President of American Central Life Insurance Company ===
- 1899–1904 - Elijah Martindale
- 1904–1905 - Addison H. Nordyke
- 1905–1912 - Milton A. Woollen
- 1912–1936 - Herbert M. Woollen

=== President of United Mutual Life Insurance Company ===
- 1930–1933 - Harry Wade
- 1933–1936 - George Bangs

=== President of AUL/OneAmerica ===
- 1936–1940 - Herbert Woollen
- 1940–1947 - George Bangs
- 1948–1952 - Leslie E. Crouch
- 1952–1961 - Clarence A. Jackson
- 1962–1968 - Edward M. Karrmann
- 1968–1977 - Jack E. Reich
- 1977–1979 - F. Leslie Bartlet
- 1980–2004 - Jerry D. Semler
- 2004–2013 - Dayton H. Molendorp
- 2013–current - J. Scott Davison

=== CEO of AUL/OneAmerica ===
- 1968–1989 - Jack E. Reich
- 1989–2004 - Jerry D. Semler
- 2004–2014 - Dayton H. Molendorp
- 2014–current - J. Scott Davison

=== Chairman of the Board, AUL/OneAmerica ===
- 1936–1941 - Alva M. Lumpkin
- 1941–1947 - Leslie E. Crouch
- 1957–1967 - Clarence A. Jackson
- 1967–1991 - Jack E. Reich
- 1991–2007 - Jerry D. Semler
- 2007–2017 - Dayton H. Molendorp
- 2017–current - J. Scott Davison

== Sponsorships ==
From 2004 through 2024, OneAmerica Financial served as the 500 Festival Mini-Marathon's title sponsor. In 2015, the company signed a four-year naming-rights partnership to become the title sponsor of Indianapolis Colts gameday radio broadcasts. OneAmerica Financial sponsored the mainstage at the Indiana Repertory Theatre for the 2017–18 season.

== See also ==
- Economy of Indianapolis
