= Saint Paul's Evangelical Lutheran Church (Fort Wayne, Indiana) =

Historic church in Indiana, United States

- U.S. National Register of Historic Places
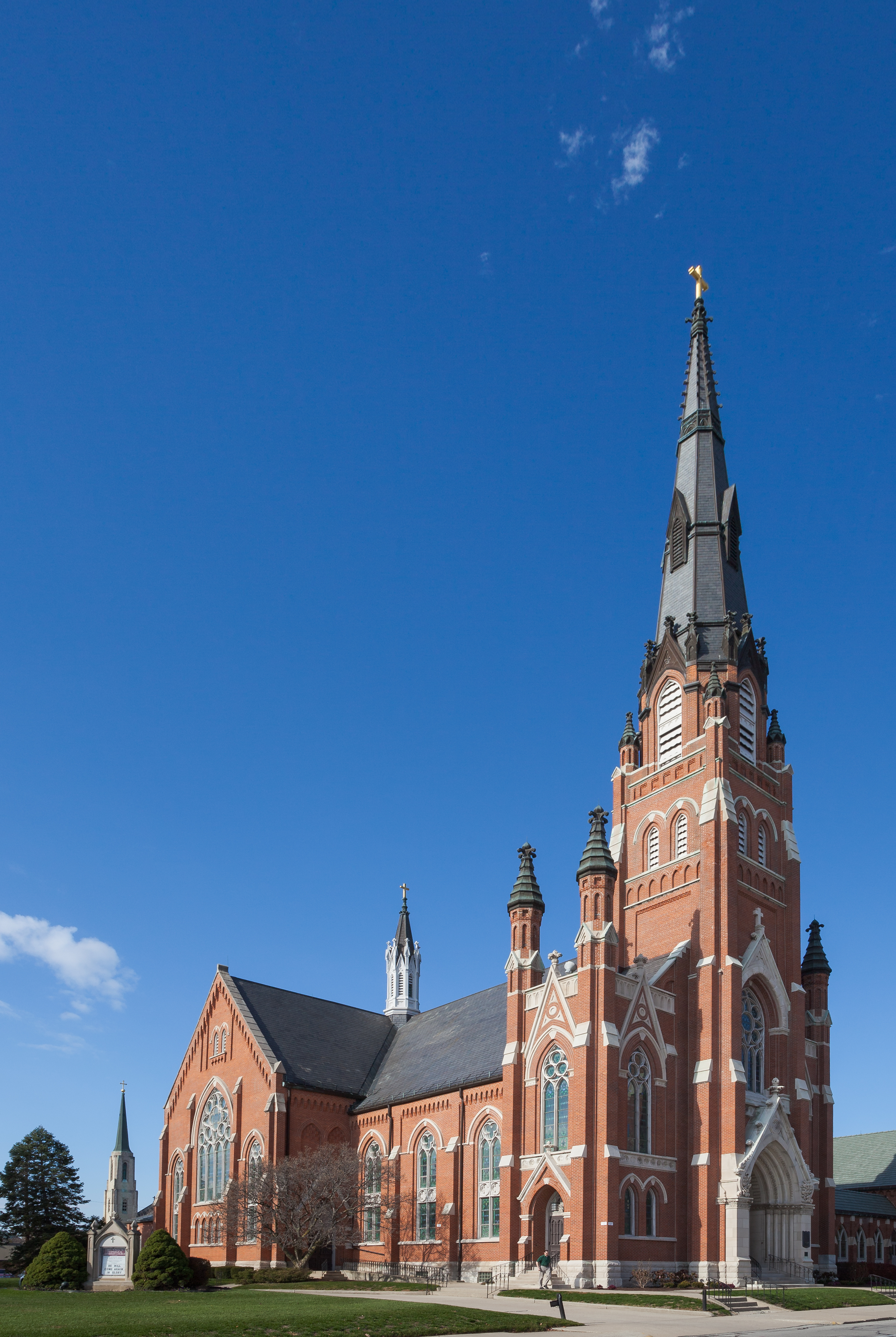
- Saint Paul's in 2012

- Location within Indiana Location within the United States
- Location: 1126 S. Barr St., Fort Wayne, Indiana
- Coordinates: 41°4′32″N 85°8′8″W
- Area: 1 acre (0.40 ha)
- Built: 1889
- Architect: Wing & Mahurin
- Architectural style: Gothic
- NRHP reference No.: 82000058
- Added to NRHP: March 1, 1982

Saint Paul's Evangelical Lutheran Church is a congregation in the Indiana District of the Lutheran Church–Missouri Synod (LCMS) located at the intersection of Barr and Madison Streets in Fort Wayne, Indiana. Founded in 1837, it is the second oldest Lutheran church in Indiana and the oldest in the northern part of the state. Thanks largely to its size and to the leadership of its pastors, it has long played a prominent role in Indiana Lutheranism and in the LCMS as a whole.

The present church building was first completed and dedicated in 1889, but a 1903 fire forced a near-complete rebuild of the structure. It was added to the National Register of Historic Places in 1982.

== History ==
The congregation was organized in 1837 and erected its first church building in 1839, on the same site as the present building. Growth of the congregation led to a larger church building being constructed in 1847, with an addition in 1862. Although two daughter congregations branched off to form new parishes during the next two decades, it again became necessary to provide more ample facilities.

The new building was designed by the architectural firm of Wing & Mahurin in the High Victorian Gothic style. By September 15, 1889, a large church had been erected. On December 3, 1903, a major fire left it in ruins. Reconstruction was soon underway, and by April 1905 it had been restored to its former glory. During the late 1940s the church underwent renovation and has had other improvements and enhancements as time went on.

The church was added to the National Register of Historic Places on March 1, 1982.

== See also ==
- List of tallest buildings in Fort Wayne

== Gallery ==
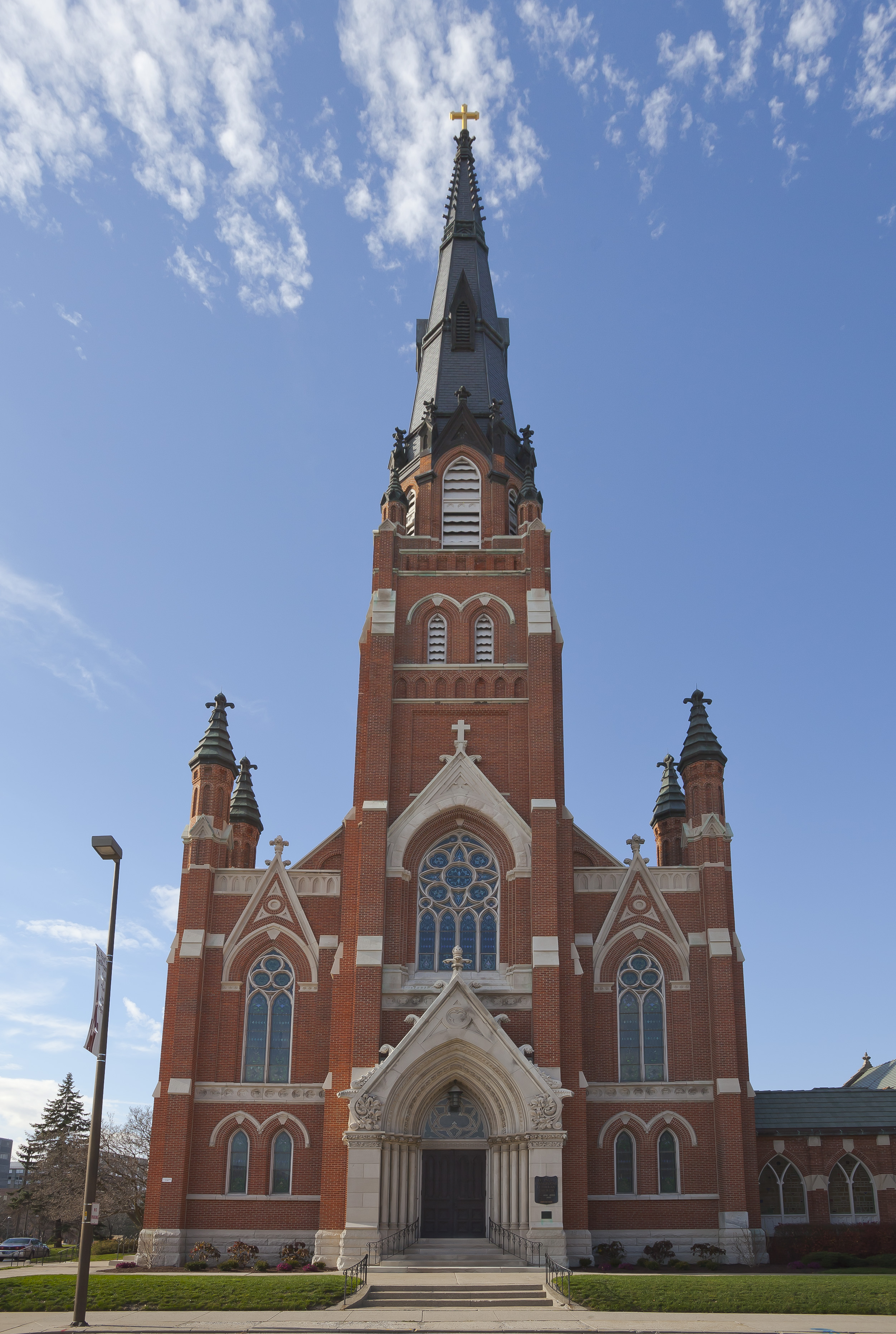

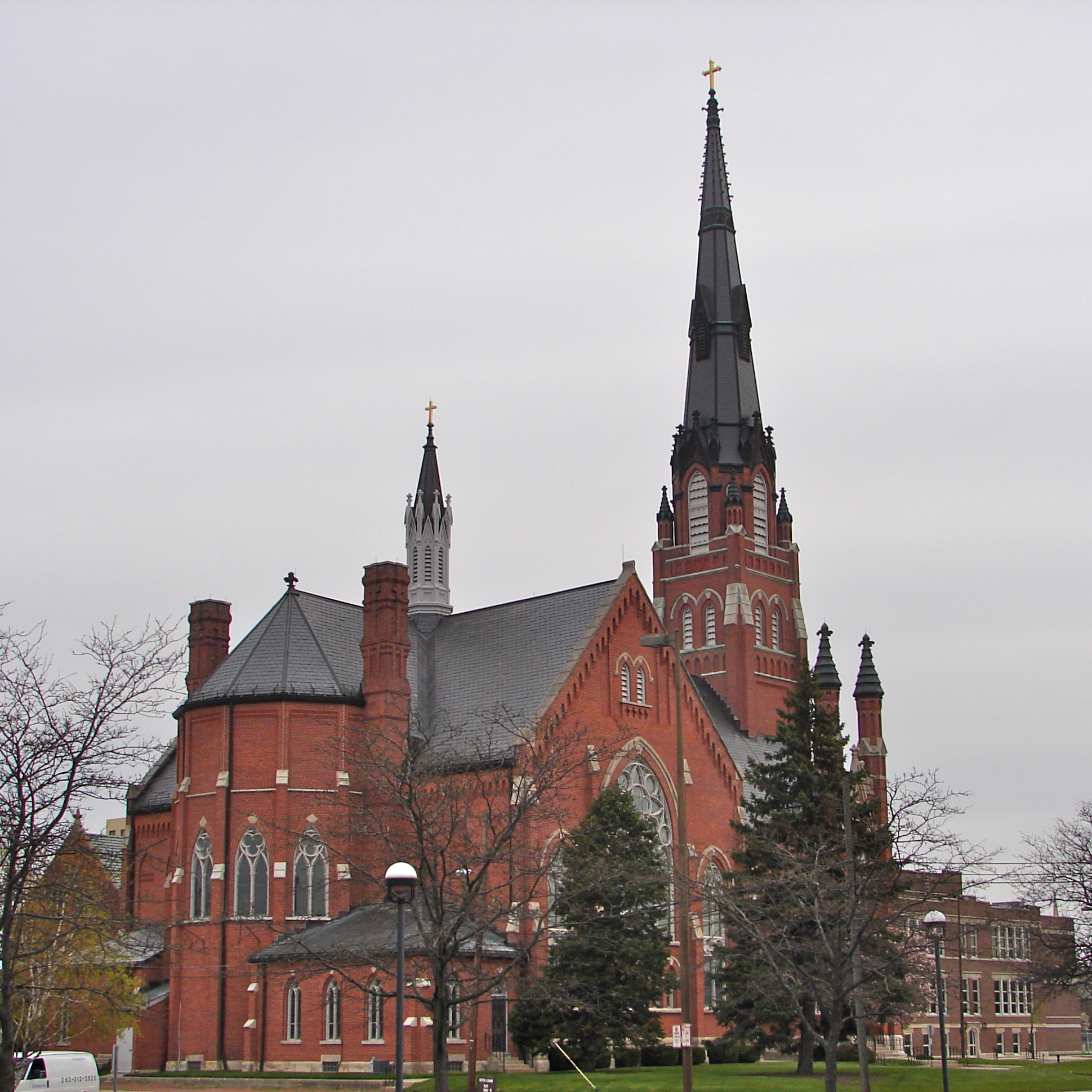

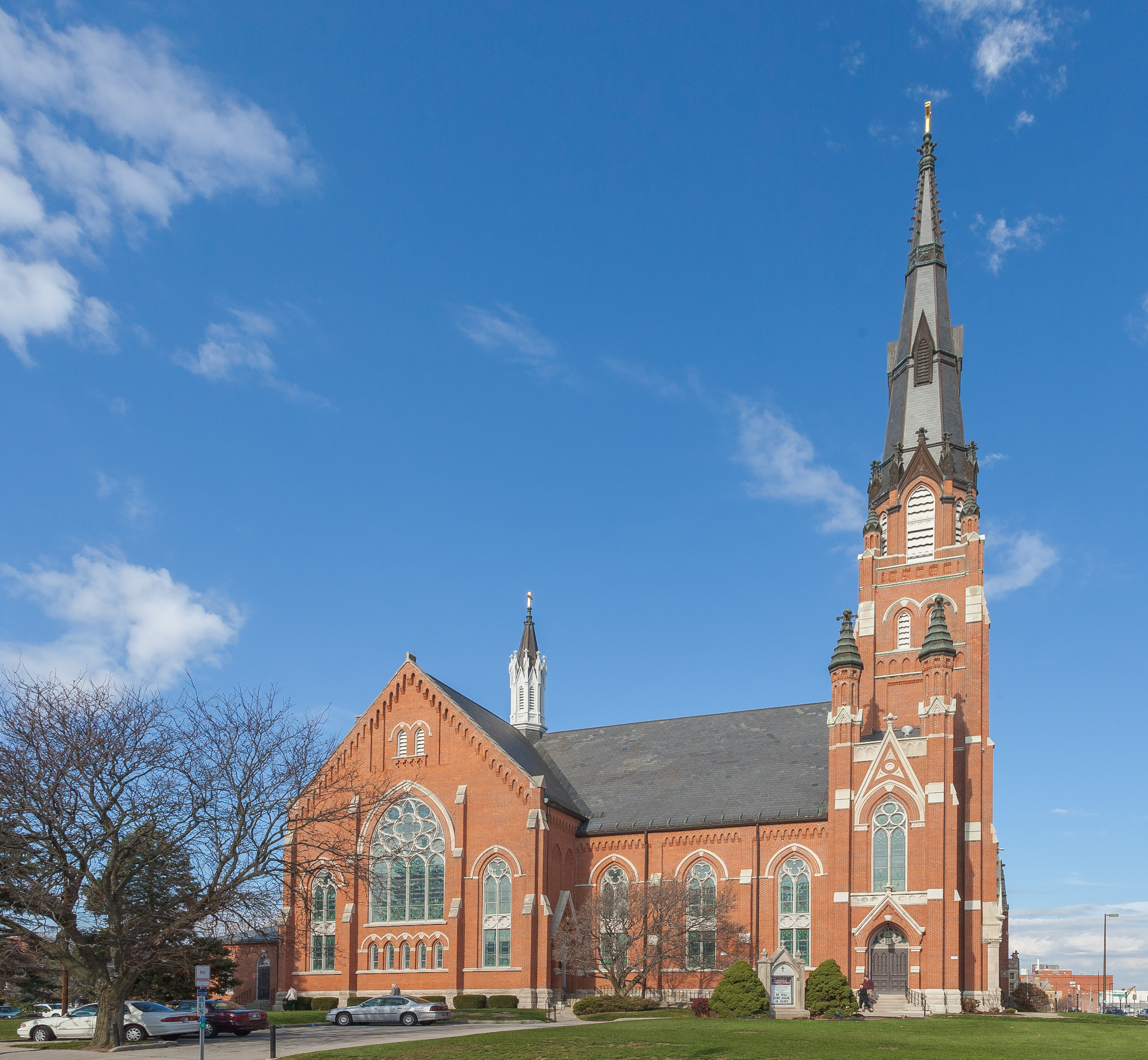
