= OneAmerica Tower =

Skyscraper in Indianapolis, Indiana, US

Coordinates: 39°46′13″N 86°9′37″W

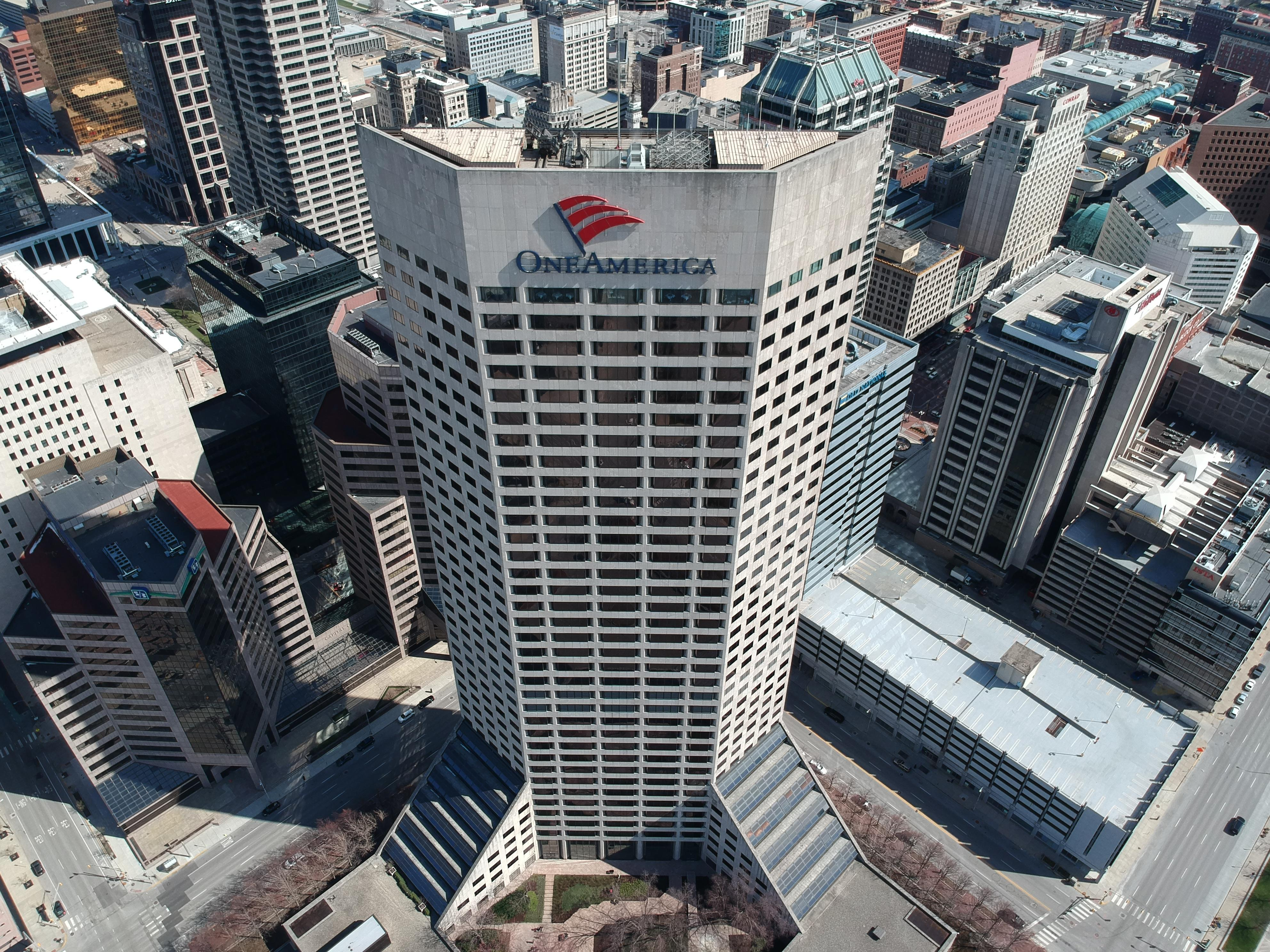
- OneAmerica Tower in 2018
- Interactive map of the OneAmerica Tower area

General information
- Type: Office
- Location: 200 North Illinois Street; Indianapolis, Indiana, U.S.
- Completed: 1982
- Owner: OneAmerica Financial

Height
- Roof: 533 ft. (162 m)

Technical details
- Floor count: 38
- Floor area: 1,199,993 sq ft (111,483.0 m^{2})

Design and construction
- Architect: Skidmore, Owings & Merrill

The OneAmerica Tower, formerly AUL Tower, is a 38-story building at 200 North Illinois Street in downtown Indianapolis, Indiana. It is used by various companies for offices. The building opened in 1982 and is faced with Indiana limestone. The OneAmerica Tower is currently the second-tallest building in Indianapolis, behind Salesforce Tower, as well as, the second-tallest in Indiana.

There is no observation deck in the tower. However, views of Indianapolis and the surrounding cities can be seen from "The Skyline Club", a private club and restaurant on the 36th floor. The rest of the building is not accessible by the general public due to the addition of electronic turnstiles in front of the elevators in the lobby.

== History ==
Construction of the building began in 1979, with 700 employees of American United Life (AUL), the company that would occupy the building, being present at groundbreaking. Nearly 200,000 4 lb (1.8 kg)-heavy bricks were used to create the buildings' facade. The building opened to AUL employees on October 14, 1982. From 1982 to 1990, the OneAmerica Tower was the tallest building in the state of Indiana, until the Salesforce Tower was completed. As of 2014, OneAmerica Financial occupies 10 floors of the building, those being floors two to twelve.

The building's geothermal power source provides water to the Indiana Central Canal. Since 1984, OneAmerica Tower has hosted "Bop to the Top" (originally called the "AUL Stairclimb"). Participants climb 500 feet (150 m) and 790 steps to raise money for charities.

== See also ==
- List of tallest buildings in Indianapolis
- List of tallest buildings in Indiana

Preceded by One Indiana Square	Tallest Building in Indianapolis; 1982—1990; 162 m	Succeeded by Salesforce Tower
