= Indiana Michigan Power Center =

Office building in Fort Wayne, Indiana, U.S.

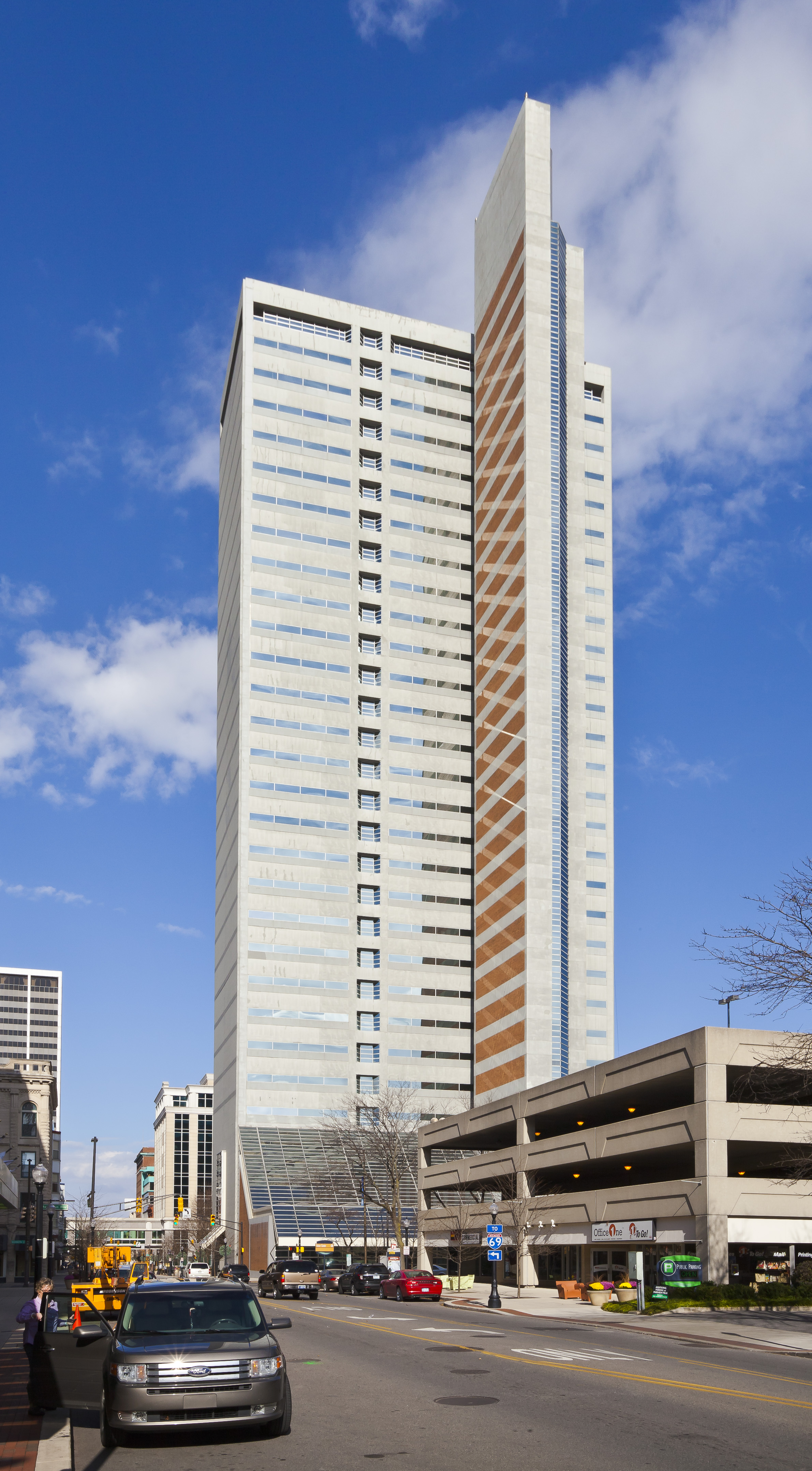
- Indiana Michigan Power Center, looking north from South Calhoun Street and West Jefferson Boulevards
- Former names: One Summit Square (1982–2014); Summit National Bank Building (1982–1992)

General information
- Type: Office
- Location: 110 East Wayne St., Fort Wayne, Indiana, U.S.
- Coordinates: 41°4′40.86″N 85°8′19.98″W
- Construction started: 1978
- Completed: 1982

Height
- Roof: 442 feet (135 m)

Technical details
- Floor count: 27
- Floor area: 270,000 sq ft (25,084 m^{2})
- Lifts/elevators: 10 (8 main, 1 service, 1 to basement)

Design and construction
- Architect: Kevin Roche John Dinkeloo and Associates

Website
- properties.naihanningbean.com/I-M-Summit-Square-110-East-Wayne-Fort-Wayne-office-retail

Indiana Michigan Power Center (previously known as One Summit Square and also as the Summit National Bank Building after one of its original tenants) is a 442 ft (135 m), 27-story building in Fort Wayne, Indiana, United States. Designed by Kevin Roche John Dinkeloo and Associates in the modern style, the building was intended to give the illusion of two structures, the adjoining tower housing the elevators. It is the tallest building (and tallest office building) in Fort Wayne and the tallest reinforced concrete building in the state of Indiana.

== History ==
The original plan called for a second twenty-story office tower and a nine-story hotel that were never built. These towers were part of a larger superblock project in downtown Fort Wayne in the late 1970s. These projects also included the Grand Wayne Center, the Foellinger-Freimann Botanical Conservatory, the Hilton Fort Wayne, the Civic Center Parking Garage, and the renovation of the Embassy Theatre. Although many projects of the superblock were completed, Two Summit Square and Three Summit Square were canceled due to the financial difficulties of People's Trust Bank. People's Trust Bank was forced to merge with Indiana Bank to form Summit Bank, which grew to cover the Indianapolis and north central Indiana areas prior to a sale to NBD Bank in 1992. The recession of 1981–1982 and a change in contractors midway through the project that led to cost overruns resulted in the completion of only one tower instead of the initially planned three. A plaza with trees and landscaping now occupies the land on which the other towers were to have been built, and is home to food trucks, community events, and farmer's markets.

Originally, the tenants of One Summit Square were electricity provider Indiana Michigan Power along with Summit Bank and its holding company Summcorp (the largest bank in Fort Wayne at the time). Through a succession of mergers, One Summit Square eventually became the Northeast Indiana market headquarters for JPMorgan Chase. However, Indiana Michigan Power is the largest tenant, occupying most of the top half of the building. Indiana Michigan Power gained naming rights to the building in 2014. Another major tenant is SIRVA, having moved their sizable Fort Wayne operations from their longtime home on US 30 in the fall of 2017. SIRVA occupies floors 5 through 11 of the building. In addition to local market and middle-market commercial banking offices on the first and second floors, JPMorgan Chase continues to maintain a Chase retail banking branch (with three ATMs) on the first floor. This branch was renovated in the fall of 2016; J.P. Morgan private banking offices were moved to an office in Indianapolis and six other Chase branches in the Fort Wayne area under the Chase Private Client offering. However, Chase Private Client was made available at this branch in 2020, tapping into the rise of the affluent locating downtown; the 2016 renovation allowed for this to be added. Barnes & Thornburg was a tenant until the spring of 2016 when Ash Skyline Plaza opened. Indiana Michigan Power Center is also home to other companies besides Indiana Michigan Power, SIRVA, and JPMorgan Chase.

The partnership that owned One Summit Square was to have ended in 2016, which would have required the tenants to find new homes. However, Hanning & Bean Enterprises, Inc. (now NAI Hanning & Bean) along with Simon Dragan and Pat Bruggeman purchased the building from the partnership in 2014 for $12 million, pledging $5 million in renovations. The new owners signed new long-term leases with both AEP and JPMorgan Chase. As a result of these changes, One Summit Square was renamed Indiana Michigan Power Center with added signage on the west and east facades of the building.

Until 2014, the thirteenth floor also housed the Window Garden Café, a Sodexo-managed cafeteria. The cafeteria reopened under the management of new owner Ceruti's Catering in 2018, and once again in 2019 as NOLA on 13. While not a partner in the cafe, NAI Hanning & Bean also owns restaurants at 1st Source Center downtown, near Northcrest Shopping Center, and two restaurants at the Ramada Plaza Hotel on the city's north side.

== See also ==
- List of tallest buildings in Fort Wayne
