= St. Peter's Square (Fort Wayne, Indiana) =

Historic church in Indiana, United States

- U.S. National Register of Historic Places
- U.S. Historic district
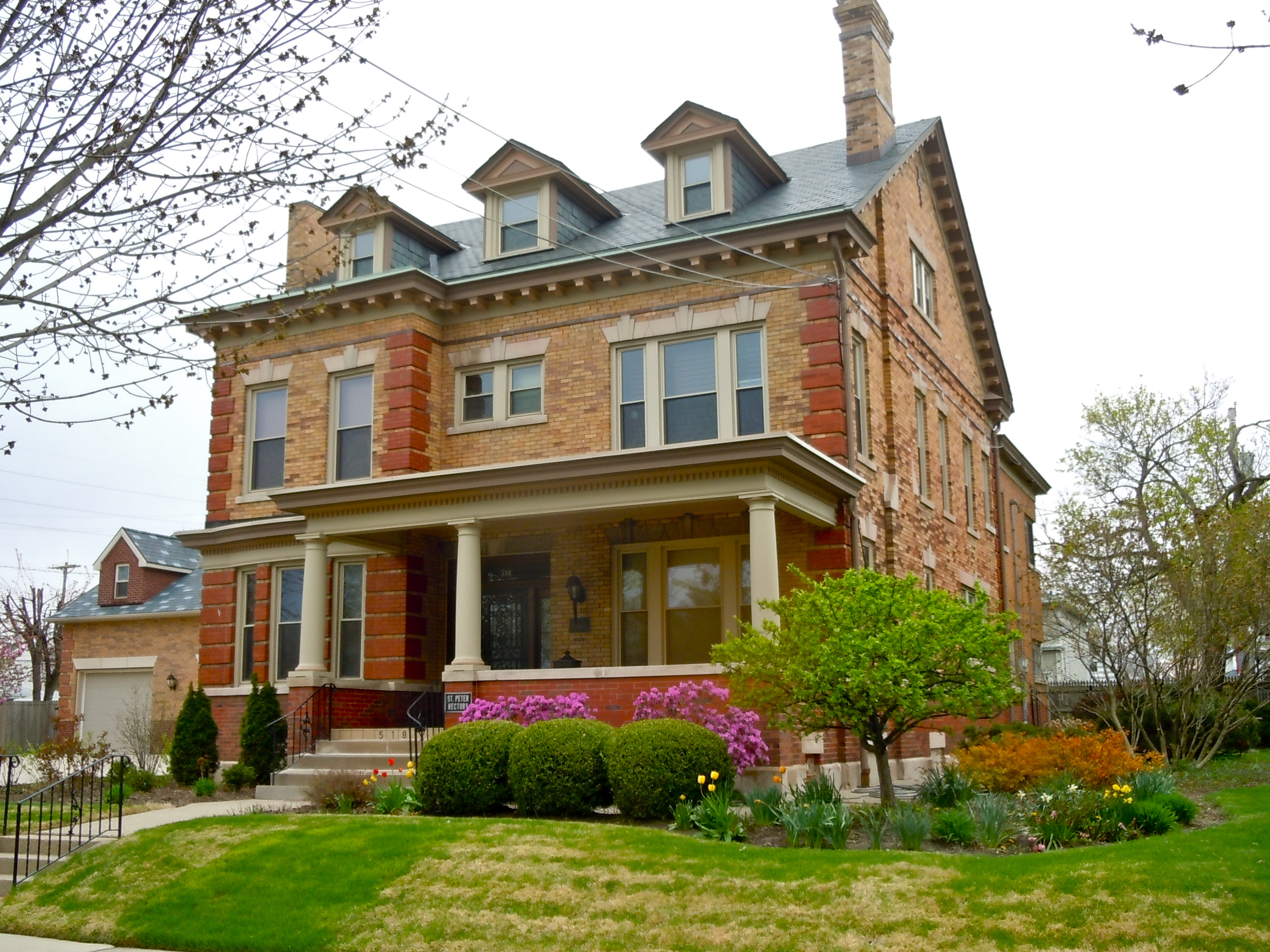
- St. Peter's rectory, April 2011

- Location within Indiana Location within the United States
- Location: Roughly bounded by St. Martin, Hanna, E. Dewald and Warsaw Sts., including 518 E. Dewald St., Fort Wayne, Indiana
- Coordinates: 41°03′56″N 85°07′46″W
- Area: 1.8 acres (0.73 ha)
- Built: 1892
- Built by: Suelzer, John, Sr.
- Architect: Dederichs, Peter, Jr.
- Architectural style: Colonial Revival, Late 19th And 20th Century Revivals, Gothic Revival
- NRHP reference No.: 91000259
- Added to NRHP: March 20, 1991

St. Peter's Square is a historic Catholic complex and national historic district located at Fort Wayne, Indiana. The district encompasses five contributing buildings associated with St. Peter's Catholic Church. They are the Gothic Revival style St. Peter's Catholic Church (1892), former St. Peter's School (1904, 1914–1915), boiler house (1905–1915), and the Colonial Revival style John Suelzer House (1911) and garage (1920s). The house serves as the church rectory.

It was listed on the National Register of Historic Places in 1991.
