= Allen County Courthouse (Indiana) =

Building in Fort Wayne, Indiana

- U.S. National Register of Historic Places
- U.S. National Historic Landmark
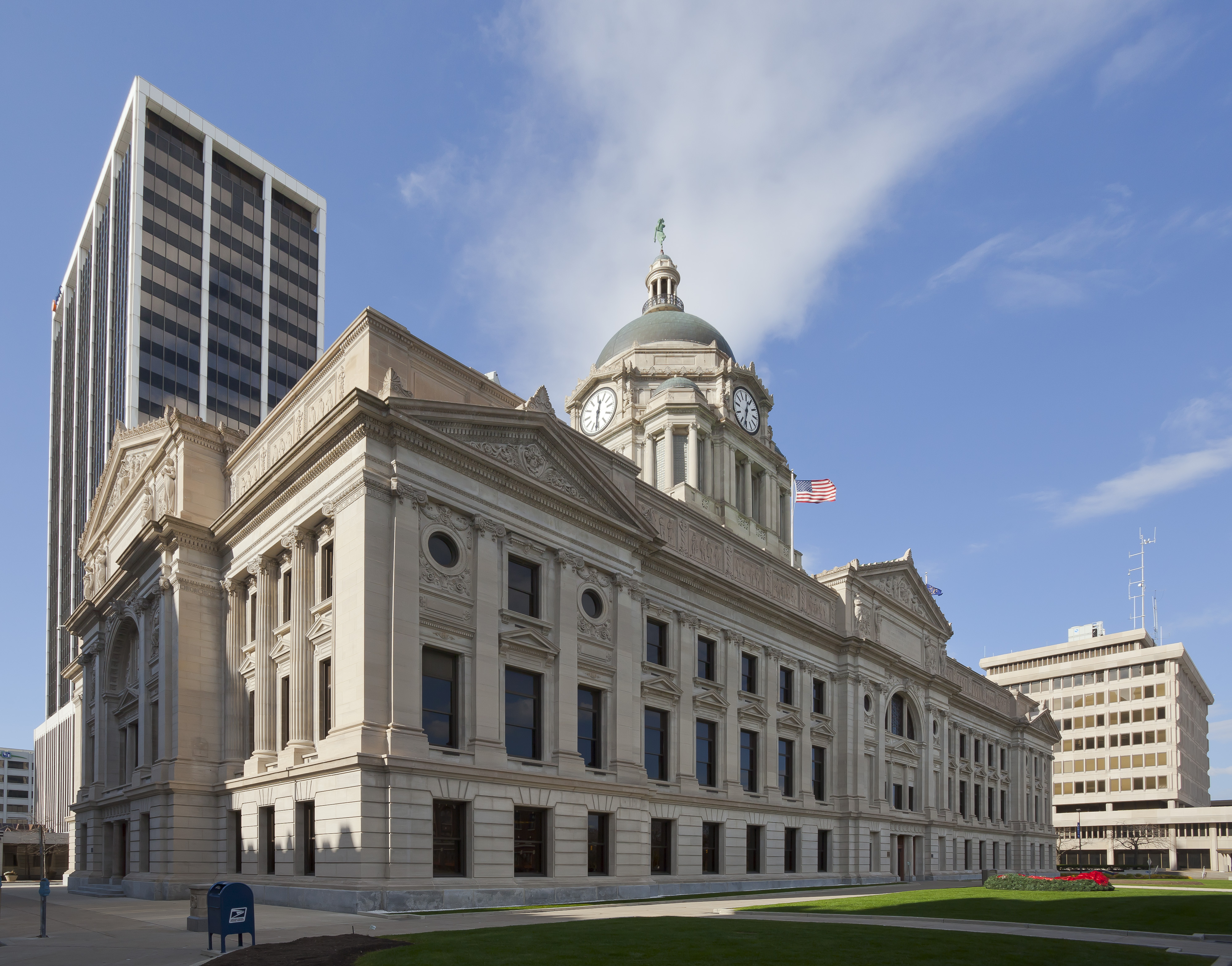
- Allen County Courthouse

- Location within Indiana Location within the United States
- Interactive map showing the location of Allen County Courthouse
- Location: 715 South Calhoun Street, Fort Wayne, Indiana, United States
- Coordinates: 41°4′47″N 85°8′21″W
- Area: about 1 acre (0.40 ha)
- Built: 1902
- Architect: Brentwood S. Tolan
- Architectural style: Beaux-Arts
- NRHP reference No.: 76000031

Significant dates
- Added to NRHP: May 28, 1976
- Designated NHL: July 31, 2003

The Allen County Courthouse is located at the block surrounded by Clinton, Calhoun, Main, and Berry Streets in downtown Fort Wayne, Indiana, the county seat of Allen County. Built between 1897 and 1902, it is a nationally significant example of Beaux-Arts architecture. It was listed on the National Register of Historic Places in 1976 and was designated a National Historic Landmark on July 31, 2003.

== History ==
Designed by Brentwood S. Tolan, construction began in 1897, the cornerstone was laid November 17, 1897. The building was dedicated September 23, 1902, with a final cost of $817,553.59 ($250 million today). Present at its dedication were Mayor Henry C. Berghoff and Governor Winfield T. Durbin. President Theodore Roosevelt was scheduled to attend, however, he ultimately was not present. On September 23, 2002, the building was re-dedicated on its centennial after a seven-year restoration effort, which cost $8.6 million.

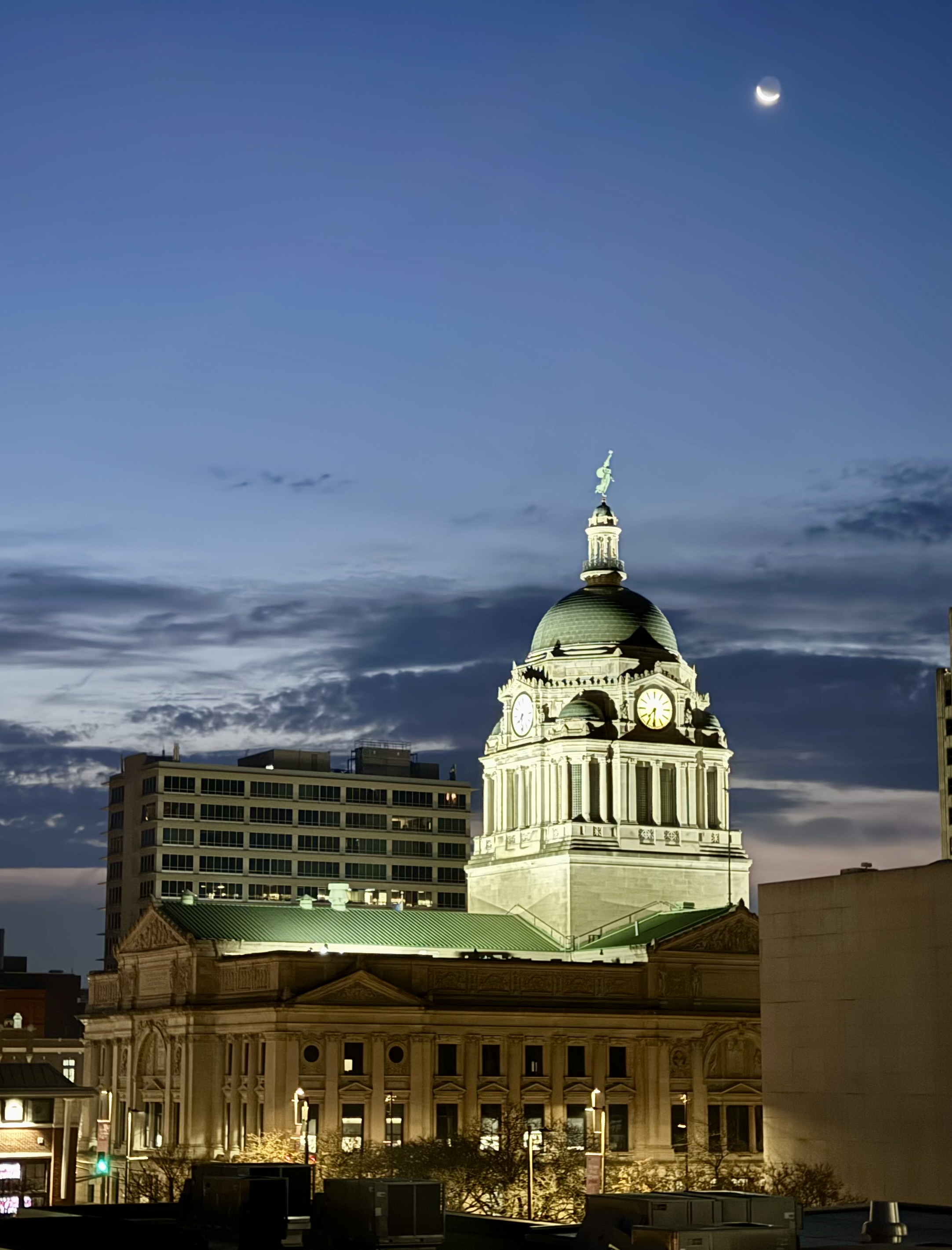
Rotunda seen at night

== Architectural details ==
The Beaux-Arts-style structure includes such features as four 25-by-45-foot (7.6 m × 13.7 m) murals by Charles Holloway, twenty-eight different kinds of scagliola covering 15,000 square feet (1,400 m^{2}), bas-reliefs and art glass. Each of the five court rooms has its own color scheme.

Atop the building is a 255-foot-high (78 m) copper-clad domed rotunda, itself topped by a 14-foot (4.3 m) statue wind vane of Lady Liberty.

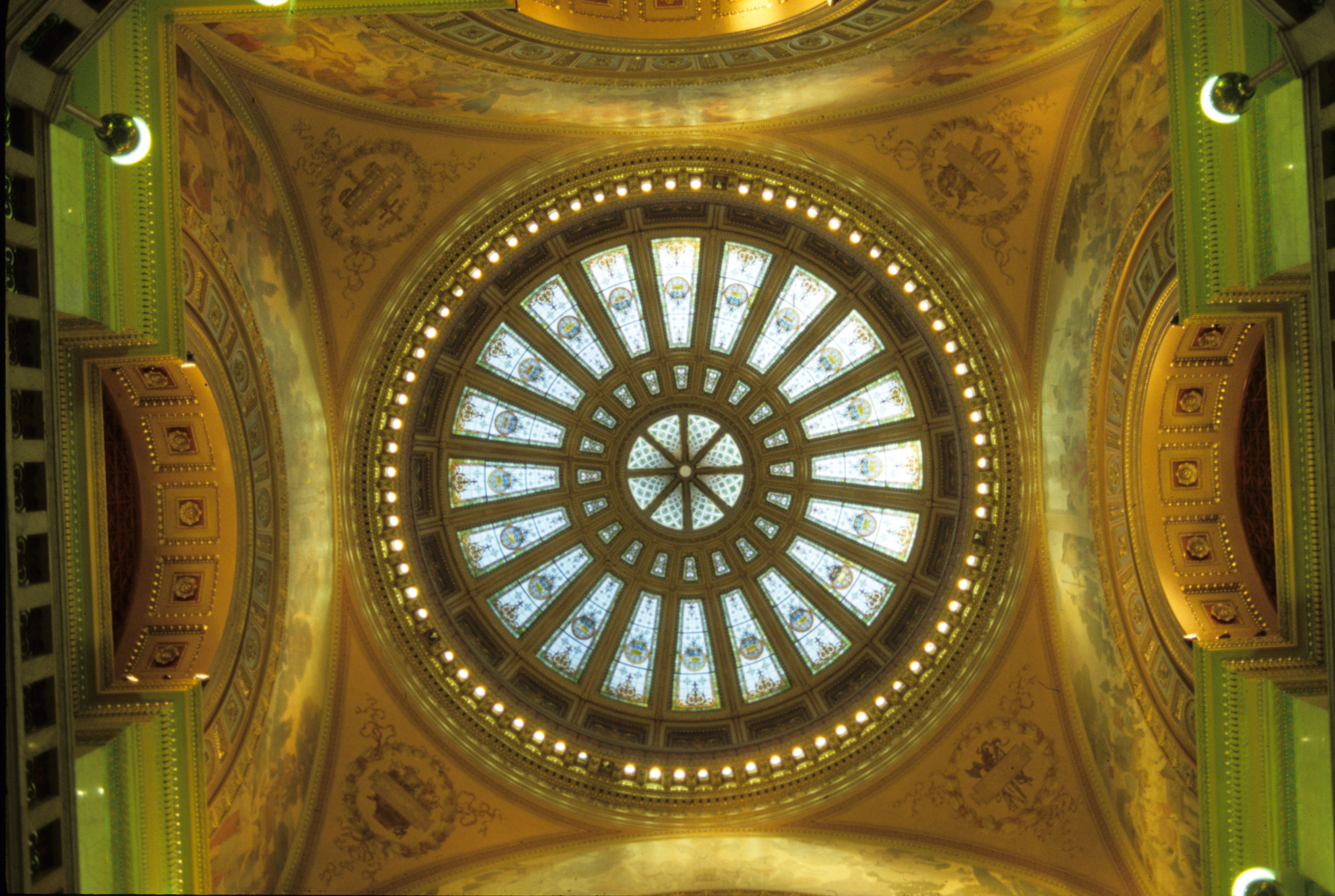
Interior dome detail of Allen County Courthouse

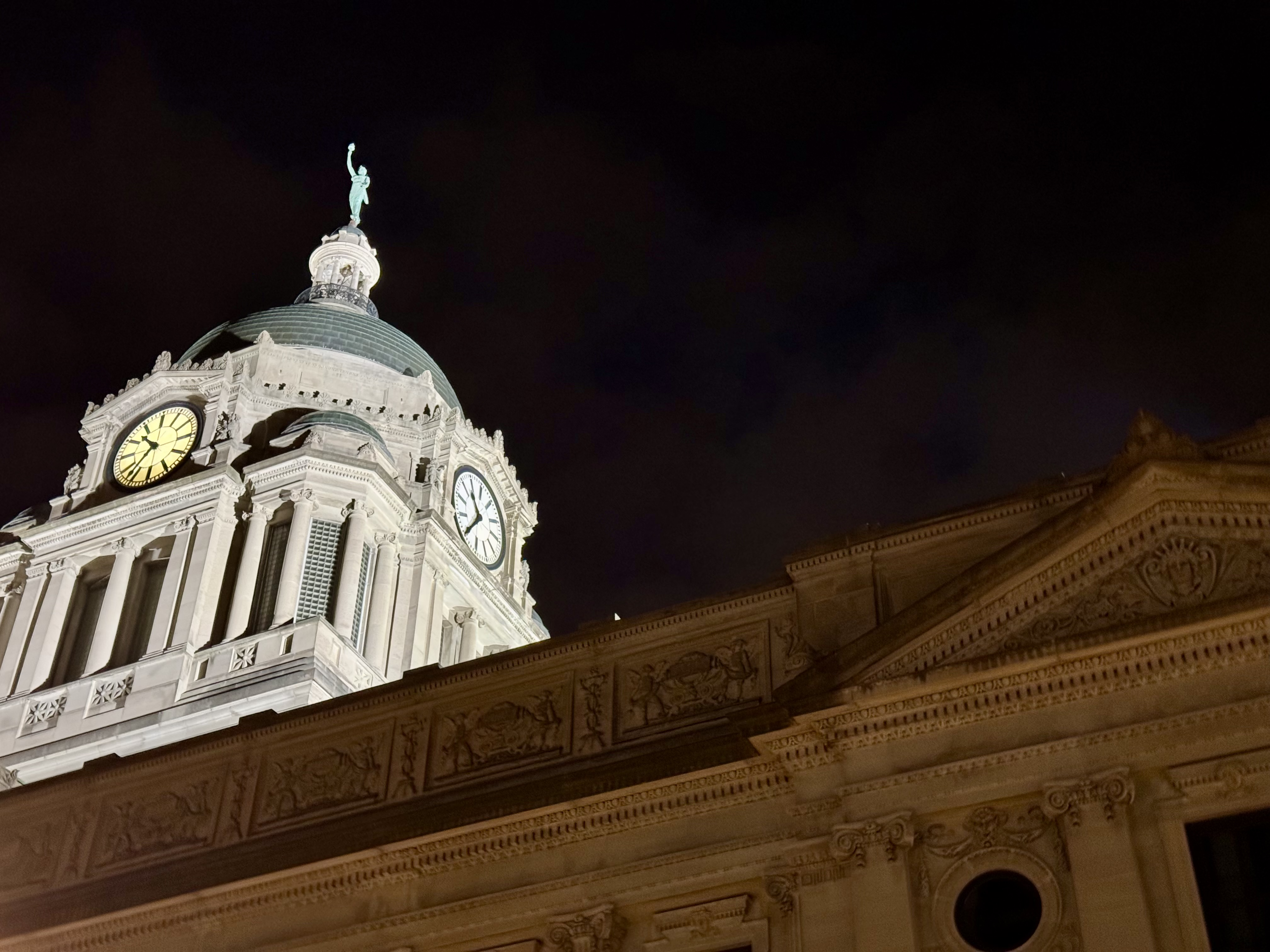
Details of the rotunda atop the courthouse

The building materials include Bedford Limestone and Vermont granite with Italian marble details. A tunnel was constructed to connect the Courthouse with the City-County Building located across the street. The Courthouse also houses a fallout shelter underground. The skylights originally built into the building were covered during World War II and replaced with artificial light.

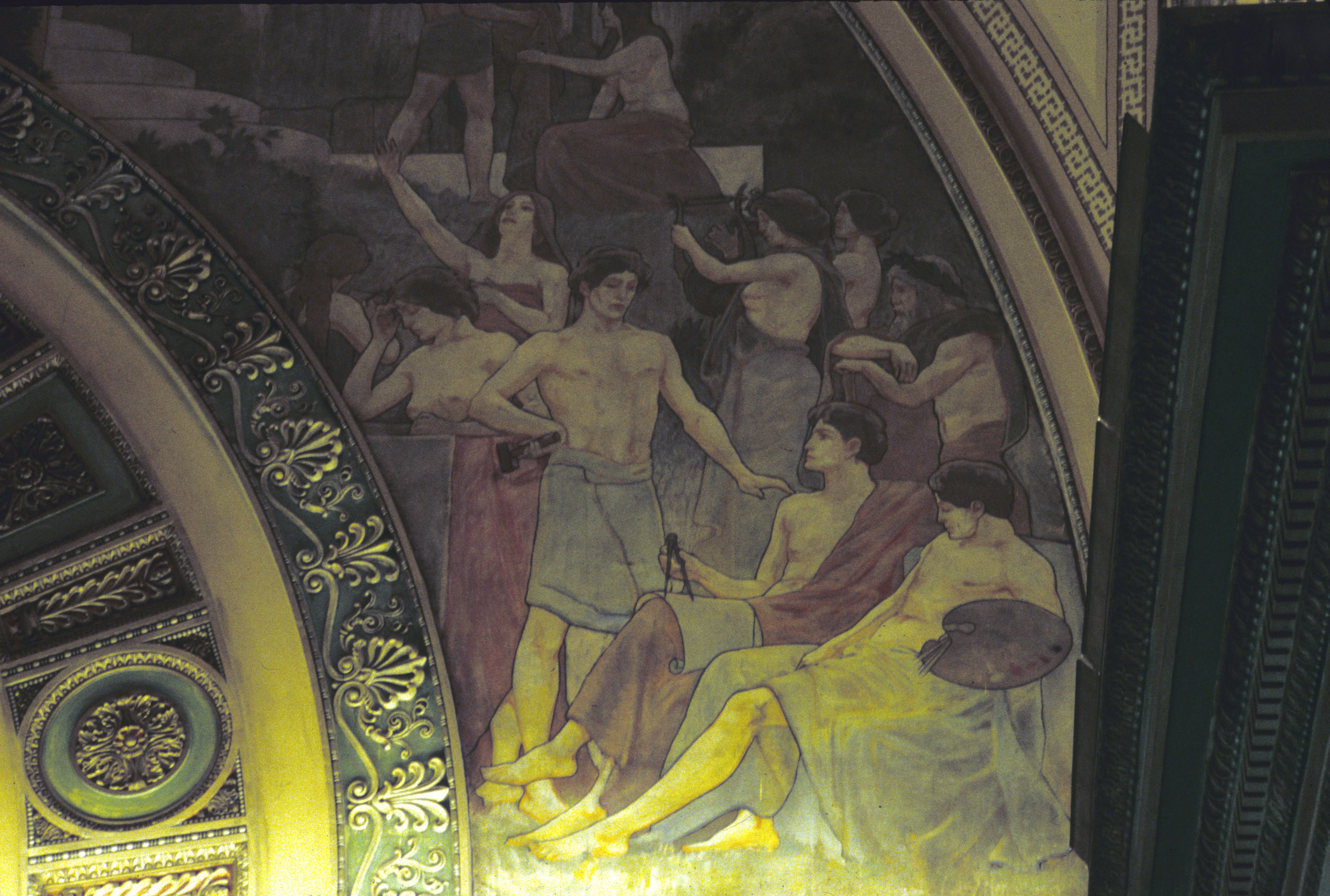
Interior detail of Mural

The 2001 National Historic Landmark Nomination says in its opening paragraph: "An elaborate combination of Greek, Roman, and Renaissance influences, the massive courthouse reflects the exuberant ambition of late nineteenth century America."

== See also ==
- List of tallest buildings in Fort Wayne
- List of National Historic Landmarks in Indiana
- National Register of Historic Places listings in Allen County, Indiana
