= USAC Daytona 100 =

US Auto Club race in 1959

- Daytona International Speedway

Race information
- Most wins (drivers): Jim Rathmann (1)
- Most wins (constructors): Watson (1)
- Circuit length: 4.023 km (2.5 miles)
- Race length: 160.934 km (100.000 miles)
- Laps: 40

Last race (1959)

Pole position
- Dick Rathmann; Chapman Root; 173.210 mph

Podium
- 1. (United States) Jim Rathmann; 170.261 mph; 2. (United States) Rodger Ward; 169.755 mph; 3. (United States) Bob Christie; (–1 lap)

Fastest lap

The Daytona 100 was a USAC Championship Car race held at Daytona International Speedway in Daytona Beach, Florida on Saturday April 4, 1959. It was the first and only Indy car race held on the high banks of Daytona, and saw incredible speeds turned in by the front-engined "roadsters." The race was part of a triple-header weekend featuring races for the USAC Championship Cars, Formula Libre, and a USAC-FIA sports car endurance race.

Both the Champ Car and Formula Libre races were won by Jim Rathmann. However, the weekend was marred by the tragic death of George Amick, who was killed in a crash on the final lap of the Champ Car race. Amick's death came less than two months after Marshall Teague was also killed testing a highly modified Indy roadster at the track. Despite a predicted crowd of over 30,000 spectators for the weekend, turnout was disappointing. With estimates as low as 7,000 to 10,000 in attendance for Saturday, the event was also seen as unsuccessful and a money-loser. In the wake of the tragic circumstances, the blindingly fast speeds were deemed too dangerous for the track, and the Indy cars would never again race on the Daytona International Speedway oval. The sports cars, however, would return and the Daytona Continental later became an annual event, now known as the 24 Hours of Daytona.

The Daytona 100 was the first race of the 1959 USAC Championship Trail, and the first Championship race held in the state of Florida since a board track race at Fulford–Miami Speedway in 1926. There would not be another Indy car race held in Florida until the Miami Grand Prix in 1985.

In 2006 and again in 2007, the IndyCar Series held a compatibility test on the Daytona International Speedway motorcycle road course (which skips the west banking), the first time Indy type cars had driven on the track in over 45 years. The test was to evaluate the facility as a possible warm-weather testing venue (and perhaps a future racing venue). However, a race was never scheduled, and the series never returned.

== Background ==
Construction on the Daytona International Speedway broke ground on November 25, 1957. NASCAR founder Bill France Sr. constructed the facility as a replacement for the Daytona Beach Road Course. He envisioned the track as having the steepest banking possible to allow the cars to reach high speeds and to give spectators the best view of the cars on track. The inaugural Daytona 500 was scheduled for February 22, 1959, and the race was to become the most prestigious stock car race in the county. The track was intended to not only be a showcase for stock cars, but was designed to host Championship Cars, sports cars, motorcycles, and closed-course speed record runs.

During track construction over the summer of 1958, Duane Carter, then-competition director of USAC, began negotiations with Bill France about hosting a Championship Car race at Daytona. A 250-mile or 300-mile race on July 4 was the focus of the discussions. On November 17, 1958, USAC announced that a 100-mile Championship Car race would be held on the high banked 2 1/2 mile Daytona International Speedway oval on Saturday April 4, 1959. It would serve as the season opener for the 1959 season. The race would be paired with a 1000-kilometer sports car race to be held on the combined road course. USAC decided to first hold a shorter 100-mile race at Daytona to allow teams to acclimate themselves to the new facility, and to serve as a tune-up for a bigger race tentatively scheduled for July 4. A second 100-mile race for Formula Libre machines was also added to the weekend. The field for the Formula Libre race would be open to unlimited engine displacements. Officials hoped the Formula Libre race would attract the Champ Cars, specially modified Champ Cars, and selected sports cars.

=== Track evaluation ===
USAC officials visited the Daytona International Speedway while it was still under construction. The officials were impressed by the facility, and expected very high speeds. Immediately, comparisons were being made to the Race of Two Worlds which was held at Monza in 1957 and 1958. The one-lap record in a Championship Car was set on the Monza oval by Tony Bettenhausen at a speed of 177.045 mph. Speeds at Daytona were expected to rival those seen at Monza. The qualifying track record at the Indianapolis 500 was held by Dick Rathmann (145.974 mph) from 1958, meaning speeds at Daytona were predicted to be over 30 mph faster than Indy.

Henry Banks was named the new competition director at USAC for 1959. Banks toured Daytona with Tom Binford and others, inspecting the safety features and named Harlan Fengler as the chief steward for the race.

=== Death of Marshall Teague ===
Upon completion of the Daytona International Speedway, Bill France wanted some USAC Championship Car teams to conduct exhibition speed runs during Speedweeks as a way to promote the new facility. USAC declined to conduct a full-field exhibition, but permitted teams the option to participate in a series of unofficial "familiarization runs" during Speedweeks. Car owner Chapman S. Root of nearby Ormond Beach was the first to express interest in participating. Three other teams were expected to test as well.

Root arrived at the track with the Sumar Streamliner, a modified Indy roadster with streamlined body and a canopy top. The driver was to be Marshall Teague, a former NASCAR and AAA/USAC Stock Car driver turned Champ Car driver. On Monday February 9, Teague made his first practice laps, turning a total of nine laps. His best lap was 171.821 mph. It was the fastest single lap ever run on a closed circuit in the United States.

On Tuesday February 10, the crew changed the gearing in the transmission, and dropped the car's ride height to lower its center of gravity and prepared to make another speed run. Teague ran about 10 to 15 laps in the 170 mph range, before being called in by the crew due to gusty winds. His fastest lap had been 170.06 mph, slightly below his mark set the day before. In addition, tire technicians observed something wrong with the left rear tire, and wanted him to return to the pits immediately. The crew discovered a cut tire, presumably from running over a piece of debris, and a protruding innertube, and called off practice for the day.

On Wednesday February 11, Marshall Teague returned to the track in the Sumar Streamliner to make another speed record attempt. Shortly after 12:00 p.m., Teague completed three laps around the track, and was gradually working his car up to speed. After laps timed at 128.42 mph, and 160.25 mph, Teague entered turns one and two on his fifth lap. The rear end of the car drifted out, and the nose of the car dipped and dug down into the pavement. The car started flipping wildly down the track, gouging chunks of asphalt, and littering debris. The plastic canopy top was broken off, and the seat was thrown from the car with Teague still buckled in the harness. Teague was killed instantly of a fractured skull. Less than two weeks after the track opened, Teague became the first driver to be killed in a crash at Daytona.

=== Testing ===
Despite the fatal crash of Marshall Teague, USAC officials decided it was not necessary to call off the April Championship Car races. The test session resumed on Thursday February 12. Two cars were at the track being prepared, but neither took any laps on Thursday. Car owner Art Lathrope had a Smokey Yunick-prepared Kuzma/Offenhauser roadster with driver Jim Rathmann. The other car was a Nisonger/Chevrolet sports car owned by Bill Sadler, with driver Bob Said. USAC did not permit Said to drive on Thursday, pending a safety inspection.

On Friday February 13, Jim Rathmann took to the track, turning a lap of 170.06 mph. Rathmann compared the track to Monza, where he had been victorious in the Race of Two Worlds. Champ Car testing was put on hold for a week, in order to allow NASCAR exclusive use of the track for the next several days. Rathmann planned to return for one last attempt at a record. Meanwhile, Lee Petty would go on to win the Inaugural Daytona 500.

The final day of Champ Car testing was held on Thursday February 19. Brothers Jim and Dick Rathmann were on hand, planning to take turns in the Kuzma//Offenhauser. Both were aiming at Marshall Teague's track record from the previous week, and likewise hoping to set a closed-course speed record. Both drivers took hot laps, but neither were fast enough to eclipse Teague's lap time, hampered largely due to strong, gusty winds. Car owner Art Lathrope, in fact, instructed his drivers not to go all out, not wanting anyone to risk getting injured. He was confident that when they returned in March, with more preparation, speeds would be up another 10 mph. Dick Rathmann was the fastest of the day at 170.65 mph, and Jim Rathmann had a best lap of 166.11 mph.

In early March, two-time National Champion Tony Bettenhausen headlined the list of entries received for the race. As many as thirty entries were expected.

== Race schedule ==
Practice and qualifying was scheduled for the ten days leading up to the race. Pole qualifying for the Champ Car race was scheduled for Saturday March 28. The second day of qualifying was scheduled for Sunday March 29, with a third day scheduled for mid-week. Practice and qualifying for the sports car endurance race would be held in the latter parts of the week.

Saturday would feature a doubleheader of 100-mile (40-lap) races. The Championship Car race was scheduled for 2:00 p.m., and the Formula Libre race was scheduled afterwards at 3:30 p.m. The sports car endurance race was scheduled for 1000 kilometers (164 laps) around the 3.81-mile combined road course. The endurance race would start Sunday at 12:30 p.m., and was expected to race well into the evening.

Race schedule – March/April 1959
Sun	Mon	Tue	Wed	Thu	Fri	Sat
22	23	24	25; Practice	26; Practice	27; Practice	28; Time trials
29; Time trials	30; Time trials	31; Practice	1 Practice	2 Time trials	3 Time trials	4 Champ Car race Formula Libre race
5 Sports Car race	6	7	8	9	10	11

Color	Notes
Green	Practice
Dark Blue	Time trials
Silver	Race day
Red	Rained out*
Blank	No track activity

* Includes days where track
activity was significantly
limited due to rain

WNDB covered the Championship Car and Formula Libre races live on radio with anchor Ted Webbe. Hal Hambrick and Val Meloy served as booth analysts, with Ben Taylor the roving reporter covering the pit area and victory lane. The broadcast was picked up by numerous radio stations in the eastern United States.

== Practice and qualifying ==
Practice began on Wednesday March 25. Pole qualifying was scheduled for Saturday March 28. Qualifiers on the second day of qualifying would line up behind the first day qualifiers, and so on, mimicking the format used at Indianapolis. Each qualifying attempt consisted of one warm-up lap, and two timed laps, with the best single lap recorded as the car's qualifying speed.

After testing and practice, participants generally praised the course. However, there was an underlying concern around the paddock about the incredible speeds. Cars were routinely turning laps at an average speed of more than 30 mph faster than laps turned at Indianapolis. Another point of concern was the abrupt transition from the steep 31° banking in the turns to the nearly flat apron. Drivers were worried that a spinning car may come down the banking and hit the apron, resulting in a serious crash.

=== Wednesday March 25 ===
Practice and testing for the Championship Cars began on Wednesday March 25. A total of 27 cars were officially entered and many were already arriving in the garage area. In order to allow drivers to familiarize themselves to the course, USAC chief steward Harlan Fengler imposed a 150 mph speed limit for each driver during their first ten laps. The next ten laps could be run at 160 mph. The speed limit was put in place as a safety precaution.

Elmer George was one of the drivers who took laps in Wednesday, turning a fast lap of 155.17 mph. Jim Rathmann took to the track in a specially-modified Kurtis-Kraft roadster prepared by Ray Nichels. The car had a 370 in^{3} Pontiac V8 engine. The test run was arranged by Firestone in order to test high speed tires. Rathmann clocked a fast lap of 172.80 mph, setting a new unofficial track record, eclipsing the lap turned in by Marshall Teague back in February.

=== Thursday March 26 ===
Dick Rathmann completed a practice lap at 170.26 mph in the Sumar Special owned by Chapman Root. Jim Rathmann took laps in the Simoniz Special owned by Lindsey Hopkins. Elmer George (167.22 mph) also was out on the track.

=== Friday March 27 ===
High winds kept the speeds down until late in the afternoon. Dick Rathmann turned the fastest lap at 173.01 mph, the fastest lap of the week thus far. Coming into the pits, Rathmann spun around three times, but did not make any contact. A total of five cars took the track, the others included Rodger Ward, Eddie Sachs, Don Branson, and Bill Cheesbourg.

=== Saturday March 28 ===
The first day of qualifying was held on Saturday March 28. A total of eight cars completed qualifying attempts, with Dick Rathmann (173.210 mph) winning the pole position with a new track record. His brother Jim Rathmann (172.018 mph) qualified second and would sit alongside on the front row. Of the eight cars, six were roadsters, while two (Branson and Sachs) were converted dirt cars.

Three other cars took to the track for practice, but did not attempt to qualify. The only reported incident of the day involved Tony Bettenhausen. During a practice run, a radiator hose blew, enveloping the car in steam.

At the beginning of qualifying, the entry list was finalized at 26 Champ Cars (one car was withdrawn). No additional cars were entered for the Formula Libre race, therefore the same qualifying results and starting lineup for the Champ Car race would be used for the Formula Libre race. Carroll Shelby had intended to enter a 4.5-liter Maserati sports car in the Formula Libre race, but after a lack of adequate practice time, he decided to race in the endurance race on Sunday only.

Start	No	Name	Car	Speed
1	41	Dick Rathmann	Kurtis/Offenhauser	173.210
2	16	Jim Rathmann	Watson/Offenhauser	172.018
3	5	Rodger Ward	Watson/Offenhauser	171.038
4	24	Dempsey Wilson	Kurtis/Offenhauser	170.068
5	21	Elmer George	Kuzma//Offenhauser	169.300
6	65	Bob Christie	Kurtis/Offenhauser	168.539
7	9	Don Branson	Phillips/Offenhauser	165.017
8	44	Eddie Sachs	Kuzma//Offenhauser	163.755

=== Sunday March 29 ===
The second day of qualifying was scheduled for Sunday March 29, which was Easter Sunday. Rain prompted officials to cancel qualifying for the day, but the track dried sufficiently in the afternoon to allow for practice runs. Going down the backstretch, Bob Veith lost control from what he believed to be a wind gust. The car spun and skidded for about 300 yards, then hit and ran up the outside guardrail. The car flipped over, slid 200 yards upside-down, then spun to the grassy infield where it righted itself. Veith suffered shoulder abrasions, and head lacerations, and his helmet was worn from where it scraped along the asphalt pavement. Though not critically injured, Veith would spend the night in the hospital, and his wrecked car was withdrawn. Veith credited the roll bar with saving his life, a new safety requirement introduced by USAC for 1959. It was later determined that a mechanic neglected to remove the starter shaft from the nose of the car. The shaft went against the steering linkage, and made the car uncontrollable, resulting in the crash.

=== Monday March 30 ===
After losing track time on Sunday due to rain, officials announced that the second day of qualifying would be held on Monday March 30. Rain once again kept the track closed in the morning, but the track dried and was opened for qualifying by 2:00 p.m. Officials noticed the ideal conditions, and decided to take advantage of the cool temperatures and calm winds. A record-setting day saw five more cars added to the starting field. George Amick became the fastest qualifier in the field, with a new track record of 176.887 mph. As a second day qualifier, Amick would line up on the inside of the fifth row. Amick's lap was just short of breaking the all-time one lap record for a Championship Car (177 mph) set at Monza during time trials for the Race of Two Worlds. In addition, Amick's Daytona International Speedway competition track record would stand until 1967.

Start	No	Name	Car	Speed
9	2	George Amick	Epperly/Offenhauser	176.887
10	75	Tony Bettenhausen	Kuzma//Offenhauser	173.010
11	8	Len Sutton	Lesovsky/Offenhauser	170.068
12	25	Bill Cheesbourg	Kurtis/Offenhauser	166.852
13	4	Jud Larson	Lesovsky/Offenhauser	163.577

=== Tuesday March 31 ===
Pat Flaherty took his first laps around the track on Tuesday March 31, driving for John Zink. Flaherty was quickly up to speed, turning in laps of over 160 mph. Pole position winner Dick Rathmann took his Sumar Special out for a practice ran, and turned a lap at almost 171 mph before deciding to come in. Rathmann had been instructed by chief mechanic Johnny Blouch to "take it easy."

Tony Bettenhausen, who qualified the Racing Associates Special on Monday, announced that he did so with a "sick" engine. Smokey Yunick announced that the engine was being torn down and rebuilt in time for Saturday's race.

=== Wednesday April 1 ===
Rain washed out a significant amount of the track activity on Wednesday April 1. Some Championship Car drivers took practice laps, including Pat Flaherty, who ran at over 156 mph. Johnny Thomson's car was expected to arrive from the west coast, and he was expected to make a qualifying attempt on Thursday.

All time trials for the sports car race were postponed until Thursday due to rain.

=== Thursday April 2 ===
The third day of qualifying was scheduled for Thursday April 2. Rain in the morning and most of the afternoon, however, washed out time trials for the Championship Cars. The remainder of qualifying was postponed until Friday. Late in the afternoon, the track dried sufficiently enough to allow a one-hour practice session for the sports car race. A total of fifteen cars took to the track, led by Carroll Shelby. Dick Rathmann, driving a Pontiac-Maserati brushed the guardrail coming out of turns one & two. The car suffered only minor damage, and Rathmann was uninjured.

=== Friday April 3 ===
The final day of practice and time trials was scheduled for Friday April 3. After several days of rain and windy conditions, the weather on Friday was ideal for track activity. A total of seven drivers qualified, filling the field to twenty cars, but the attention of the day focused on two crashes involving Jerry Unser and Al Keller, respectively.

During a practice run, Jerry Unser lost control in turns three–four. At a speed of about 155 mph, the car hit a bump in the pavement, and the back end came around, sending the car down to the apron. The car hit the apron, got airborne briefly, then shot upwards across the track tail-first. The car slid and hit the outside guardrail with the left side. The car came to rest in the infield grass losing the hood in the process. Unser was taken to the hospital with minor back injures. The car was badly damaged and withdrawn. Earlier in the day, Al Keller spun in the tri-oval segment of the track, near the start/finish line. After completing a lap at over 165 mph, Keller claims to have hit a rise in the pavement, and lost control. Observers say the car was running a very high line on the track. The car slid for 1,250 feet, and looped around at least four times in the infield grass, splashing puddles of water and mud. The car remained upright, and Keller was not injured.

The final round of time trials saw A. J. Foyt as the fastest qualifier of the day. Foyt ran two identical laps of 168.919 mph, which placed him in the inside of row seven. Pat Flaherty ran a purported first lap of over 172 mph, but the electric eye was not turned on properly. His second lap was cut short by a broken fuel line. Later in the day Flaherty made a second attempt, but with the engine running on only three cylinders, could only manage a lap of 145.773 mph. Only 19 cars completed attempts, with Jimmy Davies unable to go out due to mechanical problems. Officials announced that Davies would be permitted to start the race in the 20th starting position provided the crew was able to make repairs.

Start	No	Name	Car	Speed
14	10	A. J. Foyt	Kuzma/Offenhauser	168.919
15	3	Johnny Thomson	Lesovsky/Offenhauser	166.852
16	82	Al Keller	Kuzma//Offenhauser	164.114
17	84	Pat Flaherty	Watson/Offenhauser	145.773
18	22	Jim Packard	Silnes/Offenhauser	164.654
19	95	Bill Randall	Kurtis/Offenhauser	100.200
20	53	Jimmy Davies	Kuzma//Offenhauser	No speed

Despite the good weather, due to the two crashes and other minor delays, time ran out to hold time trials for the sports car endurance race. Instead, officials decided to line the cars up in order of engine size, with the largest machines at the front.

== Starting grid — Championship Car race ==
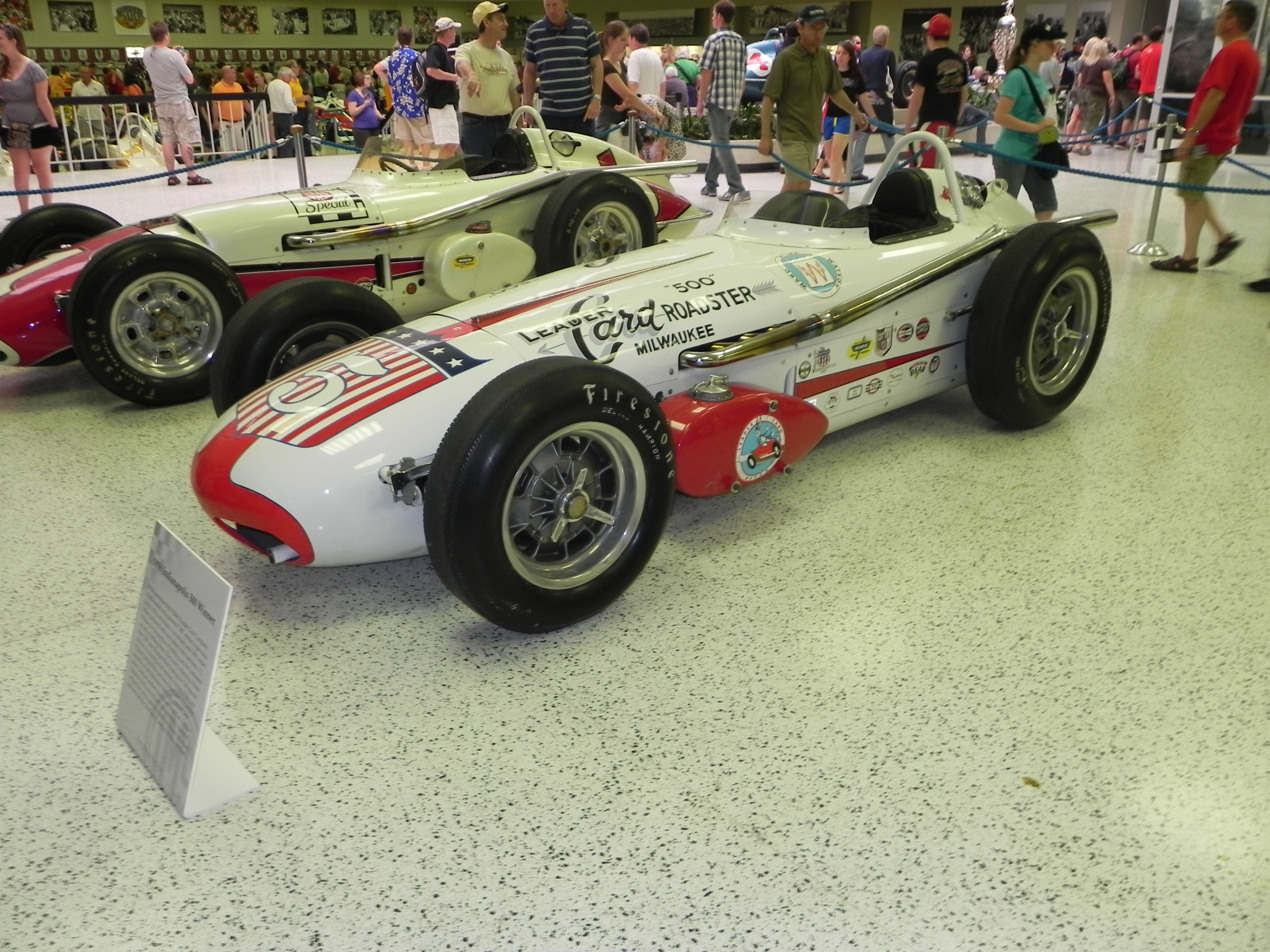
1959 Leader Card Roadster driven by Rodger Ward.

Row	Inside	Outside
1	Dick Rathmann	Jim Rathmann
2	Rodger Ward	Dempsey Wilson
3	Elmer George	Bob Christie
4	Don Branson	Eddie Sachs
5	George Amick	Tony Bettenhausen
6	Len Sutton	Bill Cheesbourg
7	Jud Larson	A. J. Foyt
8	Johnny Thomson	Al Keller
9	Pat Flaherty	Jim Packard
10	Bill Randall	Jimmy Davies

=== Failed to qualify ===
- Jerry Unser (#52) — Practice crash; injured
- Bob Veith (#52) — Practice crash; injured
- Mike Magill (#77) — Did not qualify
- Chuck Arnold (#71) — Did not qualify
- Paul Russo (#75) — Car driven by Tony Bettenhausen
- Bob Said (#95) — Car driven by Bill Randall
- Tony Bettenhausen (#1) — Did not appear; withdrawn

== Race summary — Championship Car race ==
The weather forecast for Saturday was partly cloudy skies and a high of 80 °F. Winds were gusting at 15-25 mph. A mediocre crowd estimated at only 7,000-10,000 spectators arrived. The race was scheduled for 40 laps (100 miles), and paid points towards the 1959 USAC National Championship. The 20-car field lined up for the start in ten rows of two, and the race began at 2:00 p.m. Dick Rathmann started from the pole position, with his brother Jim Rathmann on the outside of the front row. Due to the short distance of the race, no scheduled pit stops were expected by the leaders. The expectation going into the race was that a new speed record would be set for 100 miles, and it may be the fastest sanctioned auto race ever run to-date.

=== Start ===
At the start, Jim Rathmann took the lead from the outside of the front row and led the first six laps. On lap 5, Tony Bettenhausen brushed the outside guardrail at the exit of turn two. Bettenhausen continued for one additional lap, then pulled into the pits with leaking fluid from the radiator. He dropped out of the race with an oil leak, and vowed never to drive another lap at Daytona, declaring "one mistake here and you're done." Also dropping out early were Len Sutton and Eddie Sachs, both with engine problems.

Rodger Ward took the lead from laps 7–11. Jim Rathmann reassumed the lead on lap 12, setting a blistering, record-setting pace. Rathmann claimed the slipstream slingshot his car ahead of Ward, despite believing that Ward's car might have been running better. Ward stated that he lacked the practice time that Rathmann had on the course, and was reluctant to open up his car to its full potential. Even Rathmann claimed he was trying to take things easy, and despite leading and setting such a fast pace, he was not going as fast as he believed he could have. Rathmann and Ward ran 1st-2nd through the remainder of the race, pulling away from the rest of the field.

=== Finish ===
On lap 28, Dempsey Wilson crashed in turn two. He went too low in the turn, and the back end slid out. He tagged the guardrail, skidded and looped around. Wilson was not injured, but his car was damaged and would have to be withdrawn from the Formula Libre race afterwards.

On the final lap, Jim Rathmann led Rodger Ward. Over a half-lap behind was Bob Christie in third and George Amick in fourth. Further behind was Dick Rathmann in fifth. As Jim Rathmann and Ward were approaching the checkered flag, the spectacular and breathtaking race appeared to be completed without serious incident. However, at the same instant, a horrific crash occurred on the backstretch, taking the life of George Amick.

=== Death of George Amick ===
Coming out of turn two, Bob Christie and George Amick were battling for 3rd-4th on their 40th and final lap. Amick's car was caught by a gust of wind, and begin to slide, striking the outside guardrail at the start of the backstretch. The car ripped out a 50-foot section of guardrail, shearing eight of the wooden support posts, and flipped airborne. The car sailed in the air for 75 feet, hit the ground, flipped again, and sailed another 60 feet. The car then barrel-rolled about ten times down the backstretch, coming to rest upright in the grass over 500 feet down the track. The magnesium wheels scraping along the pavement showered sparks and flames of "rainbow colors," and debris rained all over the course. The fuel tank, however, remained intact.

Dick Rathmann was trailing about 50 feet behind Amick when the crash occurred. Rathmann veered low and avoided the crashing car, and escaped unscathed. Jim Packard also skirted by the scene. Bill Cheesbourg was running behind Amick, and spun his car to the infield grass to avoid the crash. Cheesbourg slid about 700 feet, but did not make contact. He ran to Amick's aid, but when he arrived at the mangled car, he walked away, realizing that Amick had been killed instantly.

Amick's mangled car came to rest upright, with Amick still strapped in the seat. The front end of the machine was wadded and twisted, and part of it was severed off. Both front wheels were sheared off, and debris littered the course. Amick suffered multiple fractures of the spine column, internal injuries, and the entire left side of his body was torn due to the multiple flips and scraping along the asphalt. The attending physician concluded that Amick was killed instantly.

The red flag was put out immediately, with Jim Rathmann the race winner and Rodger Ward finishing second. Those were the only two cars credited with completing the 40 laps. Rathmann's margin of victory was just over six seconds. All other cars were flagged off the track, and scoring reverted to the previous lap for the rest of the field. Bob Christie was credited with third, and Amick was scored fourth. Rathmann's blistering average speed of 170.261 mph was a new record for a Championship Car race, and also set a world closed-course record for 100 miles.

- Sources: The Indianapolis Star, Daytona Beach Sunday News-Journal, The Talk of Gasoline Alley

== Box score — Championship Car race ==
Finish	Start	No	Name	Chassis/Engine	Laps	Status
1	2	16	Jim Rathmann	Watson/Offenhauser	40	170.261 mph
2	3	5	Rodger Ward	Watson/Offenhauser	40	+6.30 seconds
3	6	65	Bob Christie	Kurtis/Offenhauser	39	Flagged
4	9	2	George Amick	Epperly/Offenhauser	39	Crash backstretch (fatal)
5	1	41	Dick Rathmann	Kurtis/Offenhauser	39	Flagged
6	5	21	Elmer George	Kuzma/Offenhauser	38	Flagged
7	15	3	Johnny Thomson	Lesovsky/Offenhauser	38	Flagged
8	14	10	A. J. Foyt	Kuzma/Offenhauser	37	Flagged
9	17	84	Pat Flaherty	Watson/Offenhauser	37	Flagged
10	18	22	Jim Packard	Silnes/Offenhauser	37	Flagged
11	7	9	Don Branson	Phillips/Offenhauser	37	Flagged
12	12	25	Bill Cheesbourg	Kurtis/Offenhauser	36	Spin backstretch
13	16	82	Al Keller	Kuzma/Offenhauser	35	Flagged
14	19	95	Bill Randall	Kurtis/Offenhauser	34	Flagged
15	20	53	Jimmy Davies	Kuzma/Offenhauser	33	Flagged
16	13	4	Jud Larson	Lesovsky/Offenhauser	32	Flagged
17	4	24	Dempsey Wilson	Kurtis/Offenhauser	28	Spin turn 2
18	10	75	Tony Bettenhausen	Kuzma/Offenhauser	6	Oil leak
19	8	44	Eddie Sachs	Kuzma/Offenhauser	6	Ignition
20	11	8	Len Sutton	Lesovsky/Offenhauser	6	Broken piston

=== Race statistics ===
- Time of race — 35:14.40
- Average speed — 170.261 mph
- Lead changes — 2 between two drivers

Lap Leaders
Laps	Leader
1–6	Jim Rathmann
7-11	Rodger Ward
12-40	Jim Rathmann

Total laps led
Leader	Laps
Jim Rathmann	35
Rodger Ward	5

== Starting grid — Formula Libre race ==
The same qualifying lineup from the Championship Car race was used for the Formula Libre race. A total of six cars from the first race did not join the field for the second race. Len Sutton and Eddie Sachs had suffered mechanical problems, while the car of Dempsey Wilson was wrecked. As George Amick was fatally injured in the first race, his car was also withdrawn. A. J. Foyt and Jud Larson also withdrew from the second race.

Dempsey Wilson who had crashed out in the first race, took over the cockpit for Tony Bettenhausen in the #75 Racing Associates machine. The car had dropped out of the first race with an oil leak, but was repaired in time to start the second race. Bettenhausen refused to drive in the Formula Libre race, vowing never to race again at Daytona due to safety concerns. Lastly, after spinning out in the first race, Bill Cheesbourg rejoined the field for the second race. Cheesbourg's car was not damaged after he spun to avoid the crashing car of George Amick on the backstretch.

Despite the race rules and specifications allowing other cars, including cars from the sports car division, no other cars besides the Champ Cars attempted to qualify for the Formula Libre race.

Row	Inside	Outside
1	Dick Rathmann	Jim Rathmann
2	Rodger Ward	Elmer George
3	Bob Christie	Don Branson
4	Dempsey Wilson	Bill Cheesbourg
5	Johnny Thomson	Jim Packard
6	Al Keller	Pat Flaherty
7	Bill Randall	Jimmy Davies

=== Did not participate ===
- George Amick (#2) — Car withdrawn; fatally injured in crash in Champ Car race
- Eddie Sachs (#44) — Car withdrawn; engine suffered ignition failure in Champ Car race
- Len Sutton (#8) — Car withdrawn; engine suffered broken piston in Champ Car race
- Tony Bettenhausen (#75) — Driver withdrew; replaced in the car by Dempsey Wilson
- A. J. Foyt (#10) — Withdrew after first race
- Jud Larson (#4) — Withdrew after first race

== Race summary — Formula Libre race ==
After the fatal crash in the first race, a lengthy cleanup was needed, which delayed the start of the Formula Libre race by about an hour. Officials shortened the Formula Libre race to 50 miles (20 laps), in part due to high winds, safety concerns, and due to lateness. USAC officials were also concerned about driver fatigue after the grueling pace of the first race.

Jim Rathmann took the lead at the start and led the first lap. Rodger Ward took the lead and led laps 2–4, with the two car battling wheel to wheel. On lap 5, Ward was leading the race when he lost control in turn two. The car spun around twice, and was clipped by Bob Christie. The car was not seriously damaged, and Ward was not injured. The yellow caution light was on for six laps to clean up the incident.

Al Keller (piston) and Bill Randall (oil leak) dropped out after only ten laps. Dempsey Wilson (driving in substitution for Tony Bettenhausen) turned the machine over to Mike Magill on lap 11.

The green flag came back out on lap 10 with Jim Rathmann leading and Dick Rathmann running second. The Rathman brothers battled wheel to wheel over the final ten laps, with Jim holding off Dick for the victory. The margin of victory was approximately 60 feet. Rathmann swept both races for the day, and earned $9,950 in prize money. Rathmann, however, was issued a $100 penalty for not properly slowing down during the yellow light period for Rodger Ward's crash.

With the caution period, the average speed of the Formula Libre race was slower at only 160.694 mph. The wheel-to-wheel competition was decidedly less intense, but the lap speeds were still blindingly fast.

- Source: The Indianapolis Star, Daytona Beach Sunday News-Journal

== Box score — Formula Libre race ==
Finish	Start	No	Name	Chassis/Engine	Laps	Status
1	2	16	Jim Rathmann	Watson/Offenhauser	20	160.694 mph
2	1	41	Dick Rathmann	Kurtis/Offenhauser	20	Flagged
3	6	65	Bob Christie	Kurtis/Offenhauser	20	Flagged
4	15	3	Johnny Thomson	Lesovsky/Offenhauser	19	Flagged
5	18	22	Jim Packard	Silnes/Offenhauser	19	Flagged
6	5	21	Elmer George	Kuzma/Offenhauser	19	Flagged
7	12	25	Bill Cheesbourg	Kurtis/Offenhauser	19	Flagged
8	7	9	Don Branson	Phillips/Offenhauser	17	Flagged
9	10	75	Dempsey Wilson (relieved by Mike Magill laps 11–17)	Kuzma/Offenhauser	17	Flagged
10	20	53	Jimmy Davies	Kuzma/Offenhauser	16	Flagged
11	16	82	Al Keller	Kuzma/Offenhauser	10	Piston
12	19	95	Bill Randall	Kurtis/Offenhauser	10	Oil leak
13	3	5	Rodger Ward	Watson/Offenhauser	4	Spin
14	17	84	Pat Flaherty	Watson/Offenhauser	4	Out

=== Race statistics ===
- Time of race — 18:40.14
- Average speed — 160.694 mph
- Lead changes — 2 between two drivers

Lap Leaders
Laps	Leader
1	Jim Rathmann
2–4	Rodger Ward
5–20	Jim Rathmann

Total laps led
Leader	Laps
Jim Rathmann	17
Rodger Ward	3

== Sports car race ==
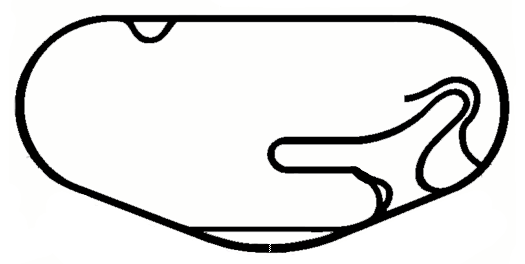
The sports car race utilized a combined road course layout similar to the modern configuration. However, the race was run clockwise, the bus stop chicane did not yet exist, and the infield portion was slightly longer.

On Sunday April 5, the USAC-FIA sports car endurance race was held. The race was part of the 1959 USAC Road Racing Championship. The event was scheduled for 1000 kilometers (164 laps) around the 3.81-mile combined road course, running clockwise. Since qualifying was cancelled, the field lined up in order of engine size. Several of the Championship Car drivers entered the race, including Dick and Jim Rathmann, A. J. Foyt, and Jerry Unser, who had recovered from the crash he had earlier in the week. A small crowd of only about 6,000 spectators arrived on a sunny, windy afternoon.

Carroll Shelby and Lloyd Ruby, both in E.B. Rose entries, led the race in the early going, building up a large lead over the rest of the field. Shelby, however, lost ground after a bad pit stop, and eventually the car dropped out with engine failure. Ruby's car also dropped out with a failed oil line. A. J. Foyt ran as high as second, but dropped out with a broken differential.

Due to darkness, the race was shortened from 1000 kilometers to six hours. A total of 14 cars were running at the finish, and no serious incidents were reported. The leaders completed 147 laps (560.07 miles) of the scheduled distance. The Porsche 718 driven by Count Antonio von Döry and Roberto Mieres was declared the winner. The lap total even included a one-lap penalty assessed due to running out of fuel on the track during the course of the race.

Top Three Finishers
Finish	No	Name	Chassis/Engine	Laps	Status
1	86	Roberto Mieres; Antonio von Döry	Porsche 718 RSK 004	147	93.345 mph
2	72	Bob Said; Art Bunker	Porsche 718 RSK	146	Running
3	7	Paul O'Shea; Augie Pabst	Jaguar D-Type	146	Running

== Aftermath ==
Immediately after the race, USAC officials, participants, and media, almost unanimously came to the conclusion that the Daytona International Speedway oval was unsuitable for the USAC Championship Cars. The banking was too steep, putting stress on the equipment, the pavement transitions were too abrupt, and above all, the speeds were much too fast. In addition, the fast speeds and steep banking were difficult physically on the drivers, causing fatigue. The tragic circumstances came in the midst of one of the deadliest stretches in the sport of Indy car competition. Teague and Amick were among ten drivers who perished in a two-season stretch from 1958 to 1959.

Along with the overwhelming safety concerns, the attendance for both the Champ Car races and the sports car race were well below expectation. Within days, USAC president Tom Binford announced the cancellation of the planned July 4 Champ Car race at Daytona. Officials at Daytona replaced it with the Firecracker 250 for the NASCAR stock cars. Indy type cars would never again hold a race at Daytona.

Despite a tiny crowd for the first sports car race, endurance racing would soon find a home at Daytona on the combined road course. The 24 Hours of Daytona soon became one of the most prestigious endurance races in the world.

== Subsequent open wheel racing at Daytona ==
After the events of 1959, open wheel racing cars rarely took to the track at Daytona, with the exception of some special test sessions and amateur-level club racing, which takes place exclusively on the combined road course. In 1974, A. J. Foyt tested an Indy car at Talladega Superspeedway, which is steeper, wider, and longer (2.66 miles) than Daytona. Foyt set a new record of 217.854 mph. In 1980, USAC tentatively scheduled a race at Talladega, but it was cancelled before it could be run.

On March 12, 2009, eight restored vintage Indy roadsters took exhibition parade laps around the Daytona International Speedway oval, celebrating the fiftieth anniversary of the 100-mile USAC race. The parade laps, led by Hurley Haywood, featured five of the original restored cars from the 1959 race, and race winner Jim Rathmann was in attendance. The exhibition was a prelude to the Concours d'Elegance being held in Jacksonville.

In 1984, and in 2006–2007, respectively, there have been three open wheel, professional-level test sessions conducted at Daytona, all three of which were on the combined road course. To-date, however, there has never been another race held. In 2016, the Ferrari Finali Mondiali event was held on the Daytona road course. Sebastian Vettel and Kimi Raikkonen took demonstration laps around the course in Scuderia Ferrari Formula One machines.

=== 1961 Mad Dog IV test ===
After the USAC race was discontinued, Bill France put up a $10,000 cash prize for the first driver to complete a lap at over 180 mph at Daytona. Car builder Bob Osiecki took a 1958 Kurtis Kraft Indy roadster and installed a supercharged 460 cu. in. Chrysler V8 engine. The highly modified Indy roadster was fitted with aircraft-style wings on the sides and on the tail, and was given the nickname the "Mad Dog IV." Several drivers reportedly tested the car in the spring and summer, and Osiecki eventually settled on driver Art Malone to attempt to break the 180 mph barrier, and set a new closed-course speed record in the process.

In July 1961, Malone began taking laps on the Daytona oval in the Mad Dog IV. His initial test laps (sans airfoils) were in the 161 mph range. The machine had been plagued by oil pressure issues due to the high speeds pushing the oil away from the oil pump. The crew was able to solve the problem by moving the oil pump to the rear of the oil pan, and adjusted the amount of oil in the crankcase. In addition, the team was using old tires left over from the Monza race, all of which wearing out after only a couple laps at speed. On August 5, 1961, Malone turned a lap at 177.479 mph, a new track record, and a new world closed-course competitive track record. It broke the mark set by Tony Bettenhausen (177.038 mph) at Monza in 1957. One day later, on August 6, Malone went out for another attempt, but suffered a seized transmission. The car broke into a spin, slid 600 feet, but made no contact. The crew took the car back to Charlotte, North Carolina for an overhaul, and planned to return later in the month.

On August 21, Art Malone and the team returned for another attempt. He upped his record to 178.253 mph. On August 27, he turned a lap of 178.571 mph, just four tenths of a second shy of the elusive 180 mph barrier. On Monday August 28, with about 350 spectators in attendance, Malone finally succeeded, officially breaking the 180 mph barrier, the first driver ever to do so at Daytona International Speedway. At approximately 4:00 p.m., Malone made two slow warm up laps, then turned a fast lap of 175.079 mph. His fourth lap was clocked at 49.59 seconds, for an average speed of 181.561 mph. It was a new world competitive closed course record, and a new track record that would stand for seven years. Malone's trap speed on the straightaway was estimated at over 220 mph. Malone nearly crashed after he crossed the finish line, as the car began to fishtail back and forth. He was able to safely bring the car under control, and returned to the pits where he received accolades from the spectators and press, and was later presented with the $10,000 check.

=== Jim Hurtubise 1968 test ===
On July 5, 1968, one day after the Firecracker 400, Indy driver Jim Hurtubise drove a front-engine roadster for a test-run at Daytona. His lap of 191.938 mph was a new track record and a closed-course speed record. He was the first driver to complete a lap Daytona with an average speed of over 190 mph.

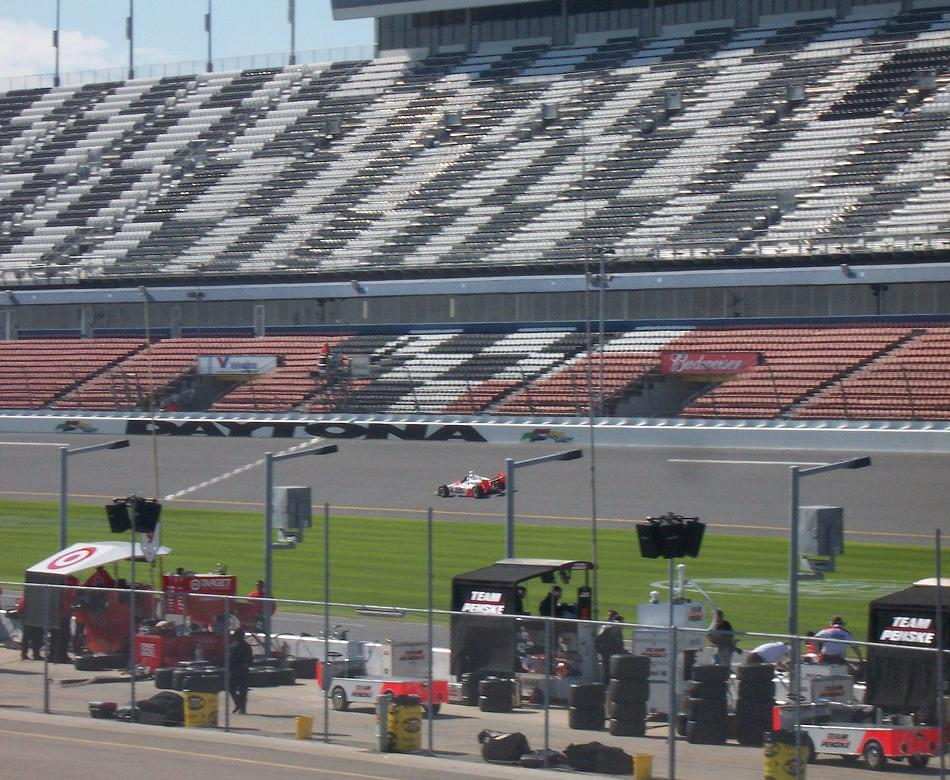
Sam Hornish Jr. at the 2007 IndyCar test at Daytona.

=== 1984 Formula One test ===
In January 1984, a secret Formula One Goodyear tire test was held on the Daytona International Speedway combined road course. Lotus and Williams were on hand to test out new F1 radial tires. Nigel Mansell was one of the drivers that participated.

=== 2006 IndyCar Series test ===
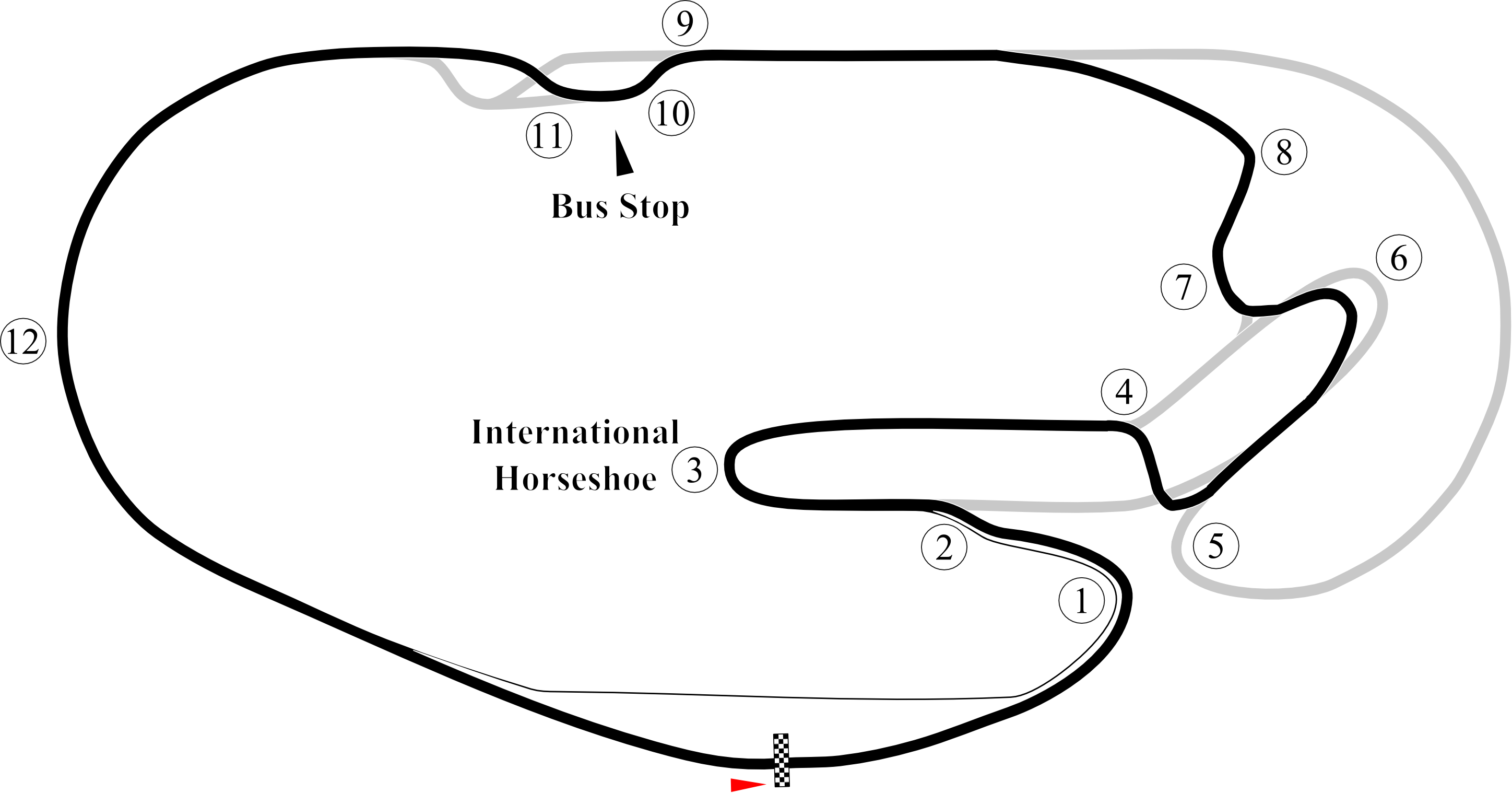
The IndyCar Series test utilized a modified version of the motorcycle short course.

On September 26–27, 2006, the IRL IndyCar Series held a compatibility test on the Daytona International Speedway combined road course. It was the first time Indy cars had driven at the track since 1959. The test was used to evaluate the track as a possible warm-weather testing venue (and perhaps a future racing venue), and also to test new engines for 2007. The test utilized a 10-turn, 2.73-mile (4.39 km) road course layout, which was a modified version of the motorcycle short course. The series avoided the full 3.56-mile 24 Hours course due to concerns about speeds, and the abrupt transition out of turn two onto the backstretch.

Vítor Meira was the first driver on the track. The other drivers that participated were Sam Hornish Jr., Tony Kanaan, Scott Dixon, and Dan Wheldon.

No incidents were reported on the first day. On the second day, Sam Hornish Jr. spun in the chicane and backed into a tire barrier. Later in the day, Vítor Meira hit the SAFER Barrier at the exit of the chicane. Both drivers were uninjured.

On the second day of the test, the drivers briefly experimented with a 12-turn 2.95-mile (4.75 km) layout, which slightly reworked part of the infield segment. The teams, drivers, and officials were pleased with the successful results of the test, and were openly considering adding the track as a venue for open testing, and possibly a race in the future.

=== 2007 IndyCar Series test ===
On January 31 – February 1, 2007, the IRL IndyCar Series returned for a second off-season compatibility test on the Daytona International Speedway combined road course. This test was held on the 10-turn, 2.73-mile (4.39 km) road course layout used the previous September, and featured seventeen drivers from nine different teams.

On the first day, Scott Sharp was the first driver on the track. Hélio Castroneves led the practice speeds during the morning session (1:13.3254). Tony Kanaan set the fastest lap of the day, and of the test, during the afternoon session. Several drivers had off-track skids, but no major incidents were reported.

On the second day, Hélio Castroneves set the fastest lap (1:12.6128) but did not eclipse the best lap from the day before. Scott Sharp was involved in the lone incident of the day. Exiting the chicane at the end of the backstretch, Sharp spun into a tire barrier, damaging the rear wing. Rain started falling at about 3:00 p.m., and all teams decided to park their machines for the rest of the day.

The 17 drivers completed nearly 1,700 laps without major incident. Tony Kanaan topped the session with the fastest single lap. After the test, speculation began to grow about a possible IndyCar race in the future. However, no official announcements were made.

Pos	No.	Driver	Team	Time	Speed
1	11	(Brazil) Tony Kanaan	Andretti Green	1:12.239	135.549
2	3	(Brazil) Hélio Castroneves	Team Penske	1:12.354	135.335
3	10	(United Kingdom) Dan Wheldon	Target Chip Ganassi	1:12.412	135.226
4	27	(United Kingdom) Dario Franchitti	Andretti Green	1:12.461	135.134
5	6	(United States) Sam Hornish Jr.	Team Penske	1:12.503	135.056
6	9	(New Zealand) Scott Dixon	Target Chip Ganassi	1:12.837	134.438
7	4	(Brazil) Vítor Meira	Panther Racing	1:12.993	134.149
8	26	(United States) Marco Andretti	Andretti Green	1:13.136	133.887
9	8	(United States) Scott Sharp	Rahal Letterman	1:13.373	133.456
10	17	(United States) Jeff Simmons	Rahal Letterman	1:13.481	133.260
11	55	(Japan) Kosuke Matsuura	Panther Racing	1:13.621	133.006
12	22	(United States) A. J. Foyt IV	Vision Racing	1:13.723	132.821
13	2	(South Africa) Tomas Scheckter	Vision Racing	1:13.811	132.663
14	14	(United Kingdom) Darren Manning	A. J. Foyt Racing	1:14.112	132.124
15	15	(United States) Buddy Rice	Dreyer & Reinbold Racing	1:14.314	131.766
16	7	(United States) Danica Patrick	Andretti Green	1:14.382	131.645
17	20	(United States) Ed Carpenter	Vision Racing	1:14.838	130.843

Since the 2007 test, the IndyCar Series to-date has not returned for another test at Daytona. Though the track was completely resurfaced in 2010, and numerous other safety improvements have been made in the years since, the series has not publicly expressed interest in returning.

== See also ==
- 1959 USAC Championship Car season
- 1959 USAC Road Racing Championship season

== Footnotes ==
=== Works cited ===
- 1959 Daytona 100 at ChampCarStats.com
- 1959 Daytona 100 at RacingReference.info
- 1959 Daytona Championship Car race at Ultimate Racing History
- 1959 Daytona Formula Libre race at Ultimate Racing History
- 1959 1000km Daytona Endurance race at Ultimate Racing History
