= Ruth Pratt Bobbs =

American portrait artist

- Born: September 3, 1884; Indianapolis
- Died: January 15, 1973 (aged 88)
- Resting place: Crown Hill Cemetery and Aboretum; 39.8167626°N 86.1712432°W
- Alma mater: Herron Art Institute
- Spouse: William C. Bobbs

Ruth Pratt Bobbs (1884–1973) is an American portrait painter. From the 1930s to the 1950s, she was a highly sought after artist in Indianapolis.

== Early life and education ==
Bobbs was born on September 3, 1884, to Julius Fisher Pratt (1845–1900) and Mary Ann Smith, and a sister Lois (1882–1932), in Indianapolis. By the age of 8, her mother began to take her to Saturday art school to train. Her father was a businessman and who was associated with Consumer's Gas Trust Co., Merchant's National Bank, and the Woodburn "Sarven Wheel" Co. Bobbs's mother was the daughter of the Indianapolis businessman, Samuel F. Smith, of Osgood of Smith & Co. Bobbs' parents both died by the time she was 16, which led her to study abroad at the Academie Julian in Paris. After her time in Paris, she returned to the United States in 1903 to study in New York. She studied with Indiana-born painter, William Merrit Chase at the Art Student League in New York City.

She eventually made her way back to Indianapolis to continue training at the John Herron Art Institute. She studied with Robert Henri, Kenyon Cox, Frank Vincent DuMond.

== Personal life ==
Bobbs married William C. Bobbs, president of Bobbs-Merril Publishing company in 1912 at the age of 28. They had planned to spend their honeymoon aboard the RMS Titanic, which should have been return trip from England. The ill-fated RMS titanic sank in April 1912, which spared the newlyweds from this tragedy.

On February 11, 1926, her husband William died and she remained a widow the rest of her life.

== Career ==
Bobbs was a prominent portrait painter in Indianapolis from the 1930s to the 1950s, though she had to fight against the stereotype of being deemed a wealthy hobbyist artists. She considered herself a legitimate artist and her painting were feature in various museums and galleries. Her portrait of Gen. Robert H. Tyndall was displayed in the 1933 Century of Progress Exposition in Chicago. In 1928, her portrait of the poet Stephen Vincent Benet was also displayed in the Century of Progress in Chicago. Other portraits by Bobbs include Frank H. Sparks, president of Wabash College and Thomas Carr Howe, president of Butler University.

Bobbs opened her own studio on Delaware street. Her work was also displayed at the Hoosier Salon, the Indiana Artists Club, and the Art Association of Indianapolis. The Indianaplis Museum of Art has a permanent collection of Bobb's portraits.

In 1917, her work was displayed on the second floor gallery of H. Lieber Company, one of those portraits being Gale Gardner of New York

== Death ==
Bobbs died on January 15, 1973. In April of the same year, an outstanding auction of her estate was held at the Indiana State Fairgrounds. Merchants National Bank was the executor of her estate.
