= INB Financial Corporation =

Defunct American bank holding company

- Trade name: Indiana National Bank (1865–1989); INB National Bank (1989-1992)
- Formerly: Indiana National Corporation (1969–1989)
- Type: Public
- Traded as: Nasdaq: INBF (1969–1989)
- Industry: Banking
- Founded: 1834; 192 years ago as the Second State Bank of Indiana in Indianapolis; May 12, 1969; 57 years ago as Indiana National Corporation
- Defunct: October 15, 1992; 33 years ago
- Fate: Acquired by NBD Bancorp
- Successor: NBD Indiana
- Headquarters: Indianapolis, Indiana, United States
- Area served: Indiana
- Products: Financial services
- Total assets: $6.6 billion (1991)
- Total equity: $462 million (1991)
- Subsidiaries: INB National Bank; INB National Bank, N.W.; INB Banking Company, North; INB Banking Company, Northeast; INB Banking Company; INB Banking Company-Southwest

INB Financial Corporation was an Indianapolis-based statewide bank holding company that was the largest Indiana-based financial institution at the time it was acquired by Michigan-based NBD Bancorp in 1992. Its primary subsidiary was the Indianapolis-based INB National Bank, formerly the Indiana National Bank, which can trace its origins to the founding of the Second State Bank of Indiana in 1834.

From the mid-1950s through the late 1980s, Indiana National Bank, American Fletcher National Bank, and Merchants National Bank, were the three largest banks in Indianapolis and its holding company, Indiana National (INB Financial) Corporation, along with American Fletcher Corporation and Merchants National Corporation, were the three largest bank holding companies in the state.

== History ==
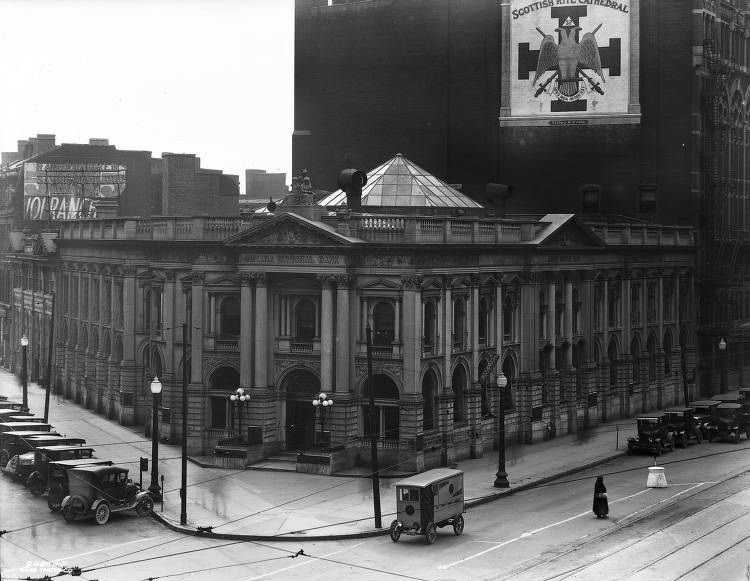
The Indiana National Bank building in Indianapolis c. 1925

The bank began as the Indianapolis branch of the Second State Bank of Indiana, one of that bank's most prominent branches. The Second State Bank had been chartered in late 1833 for a period of 25 years, and was succeeded by the Third State Bank of Indiana. The National Bank Act that the U.S. Congress passed during the Civil War ended the need for a state banking system, and the Indiana National Bank of Indianapolis came into existence.

In 1895, the bank's building on the south side of Washington Street just east of Meridian Street was destroyed in a fire. The bank's vault fell from the first floor into the basement, but the contents of the vault, which included $930,000 in gold, $48,000 in silver, $175,000 in paper currency, and $231,000 in bank bills, were undamaged.

The bank's board of directors decided to build a new building on the triangular plot of ground at the southeast intersection of Pennsylvania Street and Virginia Avenue, a block east of the former location. The architectural firm of D. A. Bohlen was hired on November 11, 1895, to design the new bank, and the William P. Jungclaus Company was hired for $50,000 on March 20, 1896, to serve as the general contractor. After the demolition of the existing structures on the site, which included the offices of the Water Works Company and of another bank, the cornerstone was laid on May 12, 1896. Construction was completed in late 1896 and the bank formally opened on January 1, 1897. The total cost, including fixtures and the vault, was $140,000. The building was of Neoclassical design, with a colonnaded main entrance and a large circular stained glass sky light in the banking lobby.

An addition, also of Neoclassical design, was built along Virginia Avenue in 1913. In 1935, a two-story addition was erected to the south of the bank on Pennsylvania Street, replacing the original Scottish Rite Cathedral in Indianapolis. In 1950, an additional six stories were built on the 1935 addition at a cost of $1 million.

By the 1960s, the growth of the bank led to a need for more office space. Construction of the Indiana National Bank Tower at the northeast corner of Ohio and Pennsylvania streets was undertaken in the late 1960s, with the bank moving into it in 1970. The old bank and office building on Virginia Avenue was sold to Jefferson National Life Insurance Company, who subsequently demolished the Neoclassical banking building and replaced it with a landscaped plaza. The Mercury and Two Allegorical Figures sculpture carved by Henry Saunders in 1896–97 that originally sat atop the bank's entrance was moved to the plaza beside the new bank building.

To allow it to acquire other banks and other financial related businesses, Indiana National Bank formed a holding company called Indiana National Corporation in 1969.

=== Expansion outside of Marion County ===
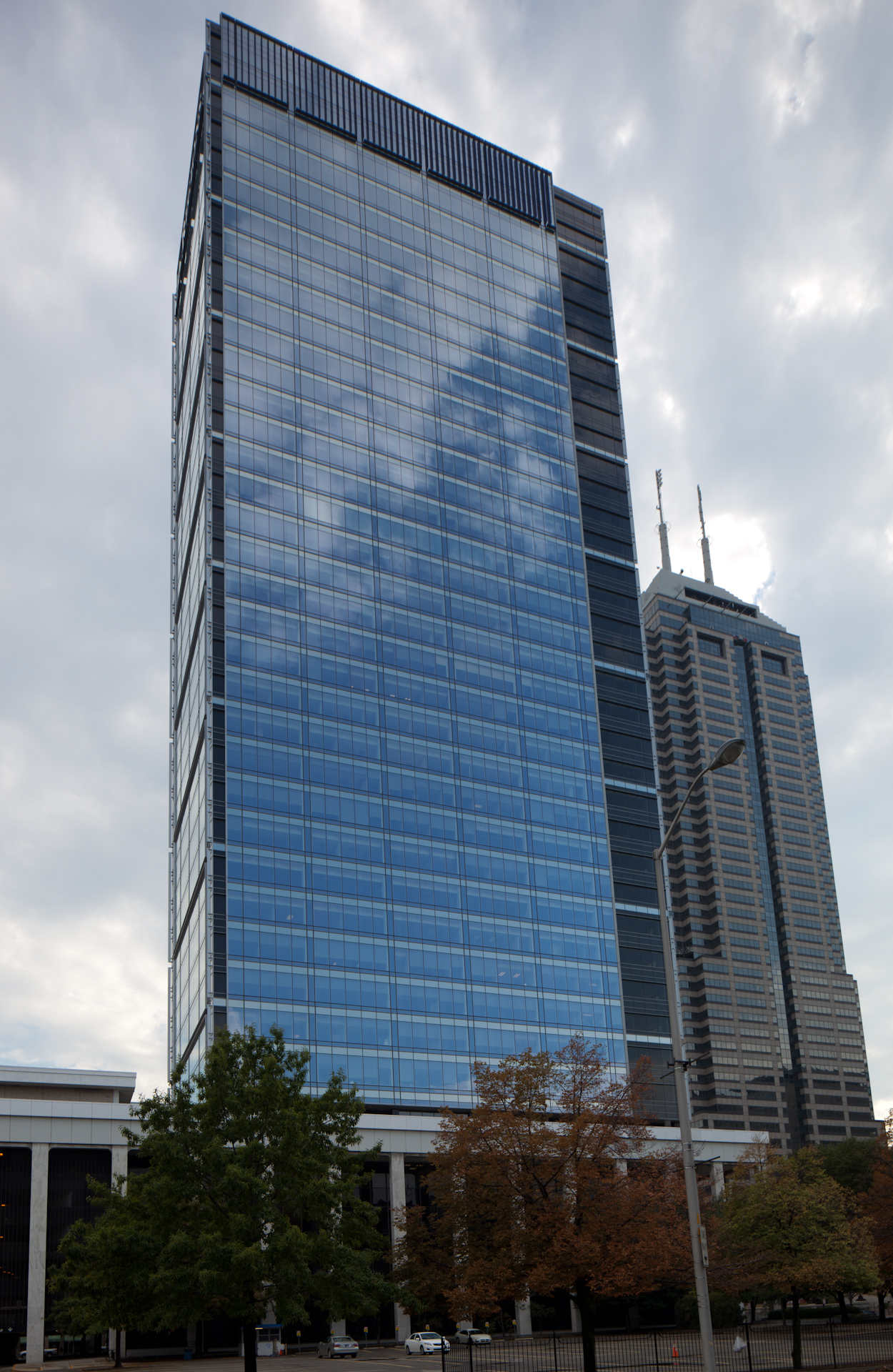
The former Indiana National Bank Tower

Until July 1, 1985, the state of Indiana did not permit bank branching across county lines nor bank ownership outside the bank holding company's home county. After that date, Indiana allowed very limited branching but allowed the purchase of banks by holding companies anywhere in the state as long as total deposits that were controlled by the holding company did not exceed a ceiling that was initially set at 11 percent of all deposits held in Indiana banks.

Indiana National Corporation made its first expansion move outside of Marion County by announcing in May 1985, two months before the new cross-county bank laws went into effect, the pending acquisitions of the Lafayette-based Lafayette National Bank, Delphi-based Union Bank & Trust Co., and Carmel-based Fidelity Bank of Indiana. The acquisition of Lafayette National Bank was completed in November 1985 for $29.8 million while the acquisition of Fidelity Bank was completed in December for $11.5 million and the acquisition of Union Bank was completed in December for $12.9 million.

In June 1985, Indiana National Corporation announced the pending acquisition of the Lowell-based Lowell National Bancorp with its Lowell National Bank subsidiary for $15.2 million. The acquisition was completed in November 1985 for $14.8 million.

In November 1985, Indiana National Corporation announced the acquisition of the deposits and the four branch offices of the failed Leo-based Allen County Bank & Trust Company from the Federal Deposit Insurance Corporation for $2 million. After the acquisition, Indiana National Bank had 45 branch offices in Marion County and 4 in Allen County.

In April 1986, Indiana National Corporation announced the pending acquisition of the Jeffersonville-based CommerceAmerica Corporation with its CommerceAmerica Banking Company of Jeffersonville and The Old Capital Bank & Trust Company of Corydon subsidiaries for $73.5 million in stock. The acquisition was completed in August 1986.

By late 1987, Indiana National wanted to expand into Monroe County, but was unable to find a local bank that it could purchase. Indiana bank branching law at that time did not allow the building of full branch offices beyond contiguous counties. To overcome that problem, Indiana National decided to purchase a small bank in Morgan County that would establish the desired branches in Monroe County before being absorbed. In January 1988, Indiana National Corporation announced the pending acquisition of the Mooresville-based Morgan County Bancorp with its Morgan County Bank & Trust Company subsidiary for $4 million. In November 1988, Indiana National Corporation announced that it planned to open three branch offices in Bloomington in early 1989. The new Bloomington offices were opened a few months later.

To aid the company in its long-term goal to expand out of state and to enable the company to have a unified brand identity, the company adopted the INB brand for all business units in April 1989. Prior to this point, acquired banks maintained their previous identity, many of which were well known in their communities. Indiana National Corporation was renamed INB Financial Corporation, Indiana National Bank became INB National Bank, Lafayette National Bank became INB National Bank, N.W., and CommerceAmerica became INB Banking Company.

In April 1989, the newly renamed INB Financial Corporation announced the pending acquisition of the Bedford-based Citizens Bancshares Corporation with its Citizens National Bank of Bedford subsidiary for $12.6 million. The acquisition was completed in September 1989.

In September 1989, INB Financial Corporation announced the pending acquisition of the Chesterton-based CSB Inc. with its Chesterton State Bank subsidiary for $18.2 million. The acquisition was completed in June 1990 and the acquired bank was renamed INB Banking Company North.

In February 1990, INB Financial Corporation announced the pending acquisition of the Evansville-based Peoples Savings Bank of Evansville for an undisclosed amount. The acquisition was completed in November 1990 and Peoples was renamed the INB Banking Company Southwest.

In June 1990, INB Financial Corporation announced the pending acquisition of the Columbia City-based FL&T Corporation with its Farmers Loan and Trust Company subsidiary for $12 million. The acquisition was completed in January 1991 and Farmers Loan and Trust was renamed the INB Banking Company, Northeast.

In August 1990, INB Financial Corporation announced the pending acquisition of the Salem-based Homestate Bancorp with its State Bank of Salem subsidiary for $6.1 million in cash. The acquisition was completed in March 1991.

=== NBD Indiana ===
In March 1992, Detroit, Michigan–based NBD Bancorp announced the pending acquisition of INB Financial Corporation, the largest Indiana-based bank holding company with its six subsidiary banks, including its flagship bank, Indiana National Bank, the largest Indiana-owned bank at the time of the announcement. NBD paid $876 million in stock and the acquisition was completed in October 1992. INB Financial was renamed NBD Indiana and all of the separate INB banks were merged into a single statewide NBD Bank that was headquartered in Indianapolis.

== See also ==
- Thomas W. Binford
