= Regions Tower (Indianapolis) =

Skyscraper in Indianapolis, Indiana, U.S.

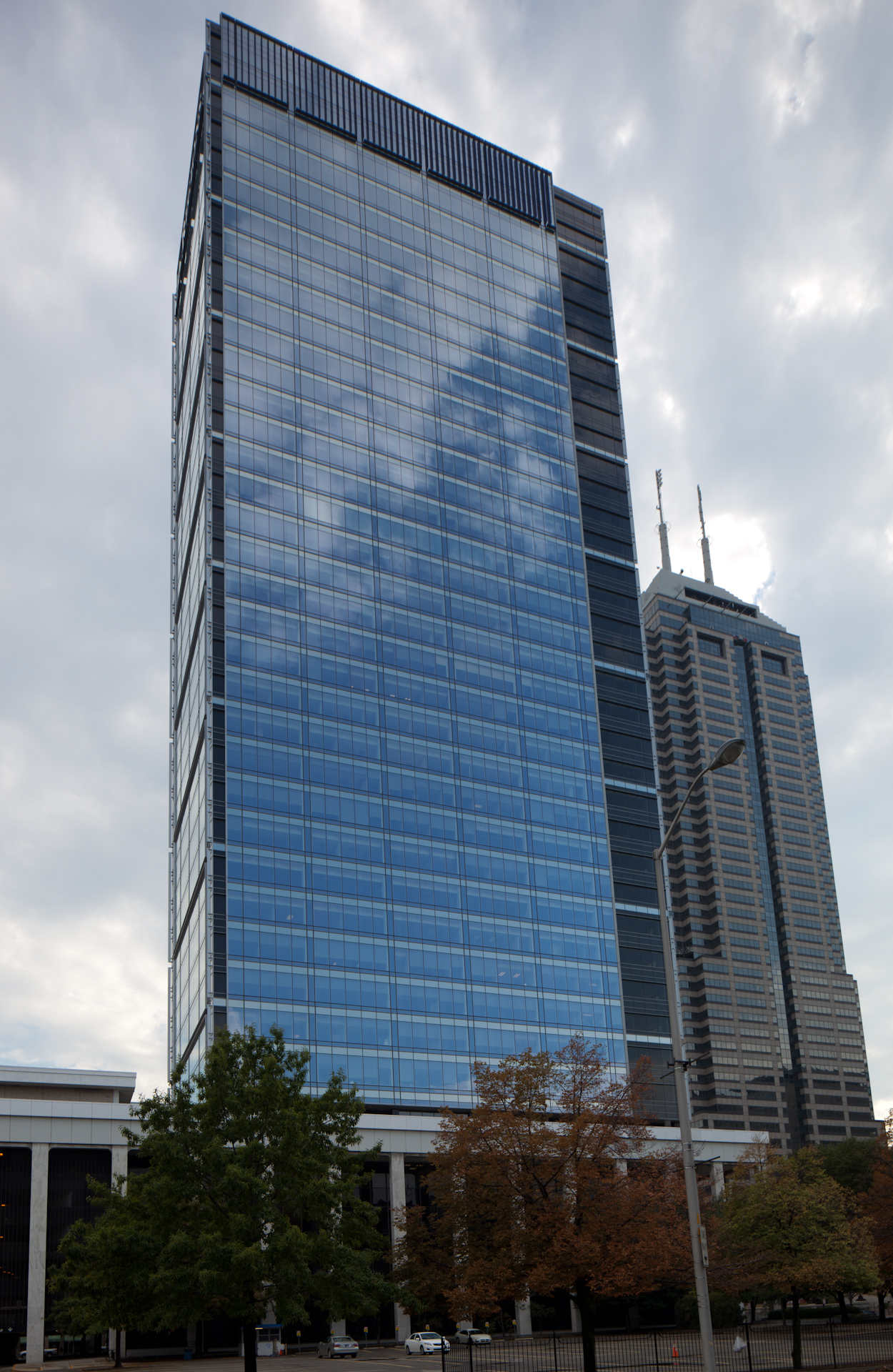
- Former names: Indiana National Bank Tower (1970–1989); NBD Tower (1989–1998); Union Planters Tower (1998–2004)
- Alternative names: One Indiana Square

General information
- Type: Offices
- Location: 1 Indiana Square; Indianapolis, Indiana, United States
- Coordinates: 39°46′13″N 86°09′18.50″W
- Completed: 1970; 2008 (facade lift)
- Owner: Nightingale Properties

Height
- Roof: 504 ft (154 m)

Technical details
- Floor count: 36
- Floor area: 677,588 square feet (62,950 m^{2})

Design and construction
- Architects: Thomas E. Stanley (1970); Gensler (2006)
- Structural engineer: McKnight Development

Regions Tower, also known as One Indiana Square, is a 36-story building at 211 North Pennsylvania Street in downtown Indianapolis, Indiana, United States. It is used by various companies for offices. The building opened in 1970 as the headquarters of Indiana National Bank. The building now serves as the Indiana headquarters for Regions Financial Corporation. The building also carries the Regions name and logo.

The tower rises from a multi-story base and covers the southern half of the block bounded by Pennsylvania, New York, Delaware, and Ohio streets. The façade is covered by dark-tinted glass beneath the tower and recessed to allow a covered promenade on the west and portions of the north and south sides. The promenade roof is supported by marble-clad square columns on its exterior. The eastern portion of the base houses a parking garage. Original plans called for two additional towers on the northern half of the block, one of twenty stories in the northeast corner and one of twelve stories in the northwest corner, but neither was constructed. The first block of Massachusetts Avenue originally ran diagonally through the block, but was vacated for the project. The Knights of Pythias Building, a flatiron-shaped building at the corner of Massachusetts and Pennsylvania, was among those demolished to allow for the building's construction.

In the mid- to late-1990s, building owners installed a new façade and exterior lighting after weather damage to the building in 1978, 1980, and 1990.

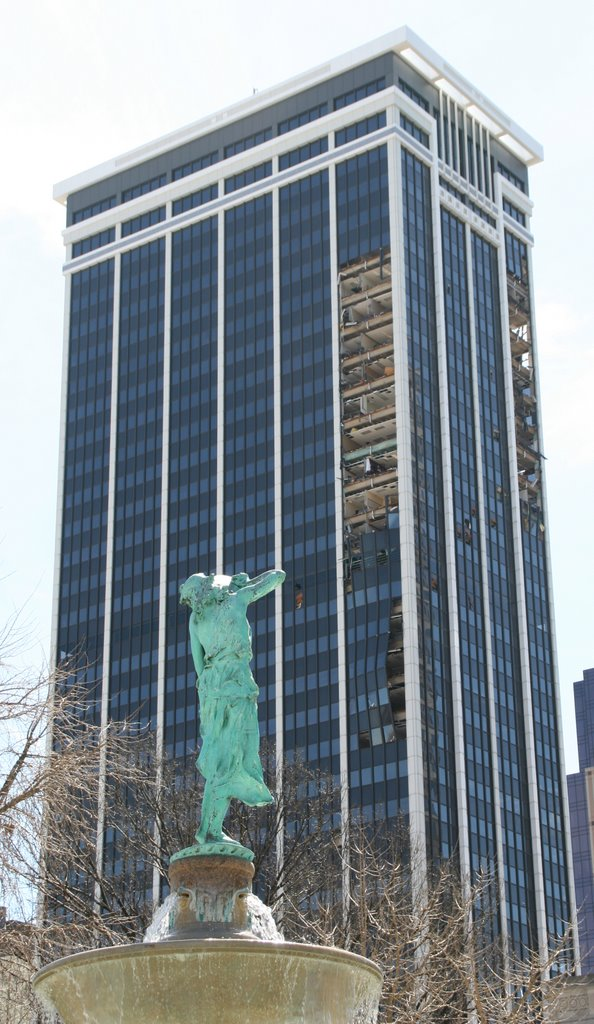
One Indiana Square immediately after the 2006 wind storm, showing the old facade

The building underwent another exterior remodeling after damage by tornado-strength winds on April 2, 2006. Owners of One Indiana Square have invested in new LED lighting system. The latest facade is a light blue curtain wall, by Gensler of San Francisco, that is largely transparent.

== See also ==
- List of tallest buildings in Indianapolis
- List of tallest buildings in Indiana

Preceded by City-County Building	Tallest Building in Indianapolis; 1970—1982; 154 m	Succeeded by AUL Tower
