= American Fletcher National Bank =

American bank

American Fletcher National Bank and Trust Company
- Trade name: American Fletcher National Bank; AFNB; American Fletcher
- Type: Public
- Industry: Banking
- Founded: 1839; 187 years ago as S.A. Fletcher & Company in Indianapolis; December 31, 1968; 57 years ago as American Fletcher Corporation
- Defunct: January 27, 1987; 39 years ago
- Fate: Acquired by Banc One
- Successor: Banc One
- Headquarters: Indianapolis, Indiana, United States
- Key people: Frank E. McKinney Jr.; Frank E. McKinney Sr.; Evan Woollen Jr.
- Products: Financial services
- Parent: American Fletcher Corporation

American Fletcher National Bank was an Indianapolis-based bank founded in 1839 that was eventually absorbed by Bank One and later Chase Bank. Since the merger of the Fletcher Trust Company with the American National Bank to form the American Fletcher National Bank and Trust Company at the end of 1954, it had been the largest or the second-largest bank in the state of Indiana, often changing places with its Indianapolis-based rival Indiana National Bank for the top spot. From the mid-1950s through the late-1980s, American Fletcher National Bank and Trust, along with Indiana National Bank and Merchants National Bank, was one of the top three largest banks within Indianapolis and its holding company, American Fletcher Corporation, was one of the top three largest bank holding companies within the state, along with INB Financial Corporation (formerly Indiana National Corporation) and Merchants National Corporation.

Starting in the 1960s, they were well known for owning the only 222-prefixed number in the 317 area code. Officially, this number was 222-AFNB (2362), but since 222 plus any four numbers would work, most people just dialed seven 2s. This line would provide a recorded message with the time, weather, and other announcements. The service was discontinued by Bank One in 1993, but five years later, Indianapolis radio station WIBC took the number 222-2222 for a new recorded forecast called the WIBC Weatherphone. That service endured for more than 25 years before being discontinued in February 2024.

== History ==
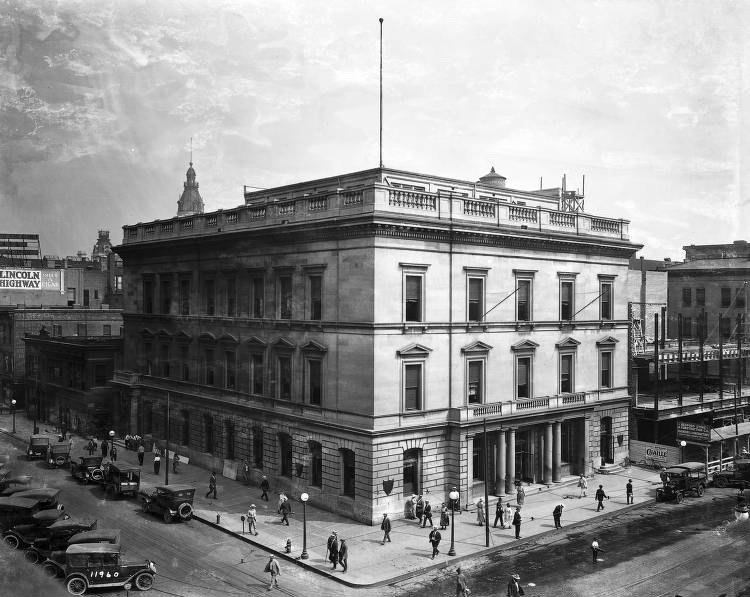
The headquarters of the American Fletcher National Bank at Pennsylvania and Market Streets in Indianapolis, 1921

American Fletcher National Bank and Trust Company (AFNB) was formed on December 31, 1954, upon the merger of the Fletcher Trust Company with the American National Bank to form the second-largest bank in the state at that time. Evan Woollen Jr., former president of Fletcher Trust, became president of the combined company. With the merger with the Fidelity Bank & Trust Company into the company on July 31, 1959, AFNB became the largest bank in the state. Woollen had died just a month prior to the completion of the merger. Frank E. McKinney Sr., the leader of Fidelity since 1935, became in charge of AFNB.

American Fletcher was one of the earliest issuers of bank credit cards within the state of Indiana with the introduction of their proprietary AFNB Charge Card in May 1966. By early 1967, the AFNB Charge Card was associated with the regional Midwest Bank Card System, an early forerunner of Mastercard. Outside of Marion County, American Fletcher franchised their charge card to other Indiana banks, such as the Merchants National Bank of Terre Haute.

=== American Fletcher Corporation ===
In 1968, a holding corporation called American Fletcher Corporation (AFC) was formed to be the new parent company for the bank and allow the company to acquire banks outside its home county once the Indiana Legislature pass legislation that would allow such actions. At that time, American Fletcher had 41 branches throughout Indianapolis and Marion County. It was not until July 1, 1985, that the laws enacted by the Indiana State Legislature went to effect that permitted the acquisition of banks outside of its home county along with extremely limited branching.

McKinney's son, Frank E. McKinney Jr., was named president in 1972 and chairman of the board in 1973. He had helped to greatly expand the bank through the acquisition of other banks, especially when banking restrictions were relaxed.

The bank made its first expansion move outside of Marion County by the acquisition of the offices and assets of the failed Shelby National Bank of Shelbyville in Shelby County, from the FDIC for $4.5 million in April 1984. The failed bank was immediately integrated into AFNB.

Just days after a new law went into effect which allowed bank holding companies to own more than one bank and to cross county lines, AFC announced in July 1985 of their pending acquisition of the Union Bank and Trust Co. of Franklin in Johnson County for $10.2 million followed by the August announcement of the pending acquisition of the First American National Bank of Plainfield in Hendricks County for $14.1 million and the September announcement of the pending acquisition of the Carmel Bank & Trust Co. in Hamilton County.

The acquisition of the Union Bank and Trust in Franklin was finalized in December 1985 just after Union Bank opened a branch office in Columbus. State laws at that time would not have allowed AFNB to open a banking office in Columbus, but it allowed AFC a presence in Bartholomew County if Union bank was able to open a banking branch office prior to the merger going into effect.

In February 1986, AFC announced that they were acquiring the Citizens Northern Company, the holding company for the Citizens Northern Bank of Elkhart, for $5 million. In the same month, AFC completed its acquisition of the First American National Bank of Plainfield.

=== Banc One Indiana ===
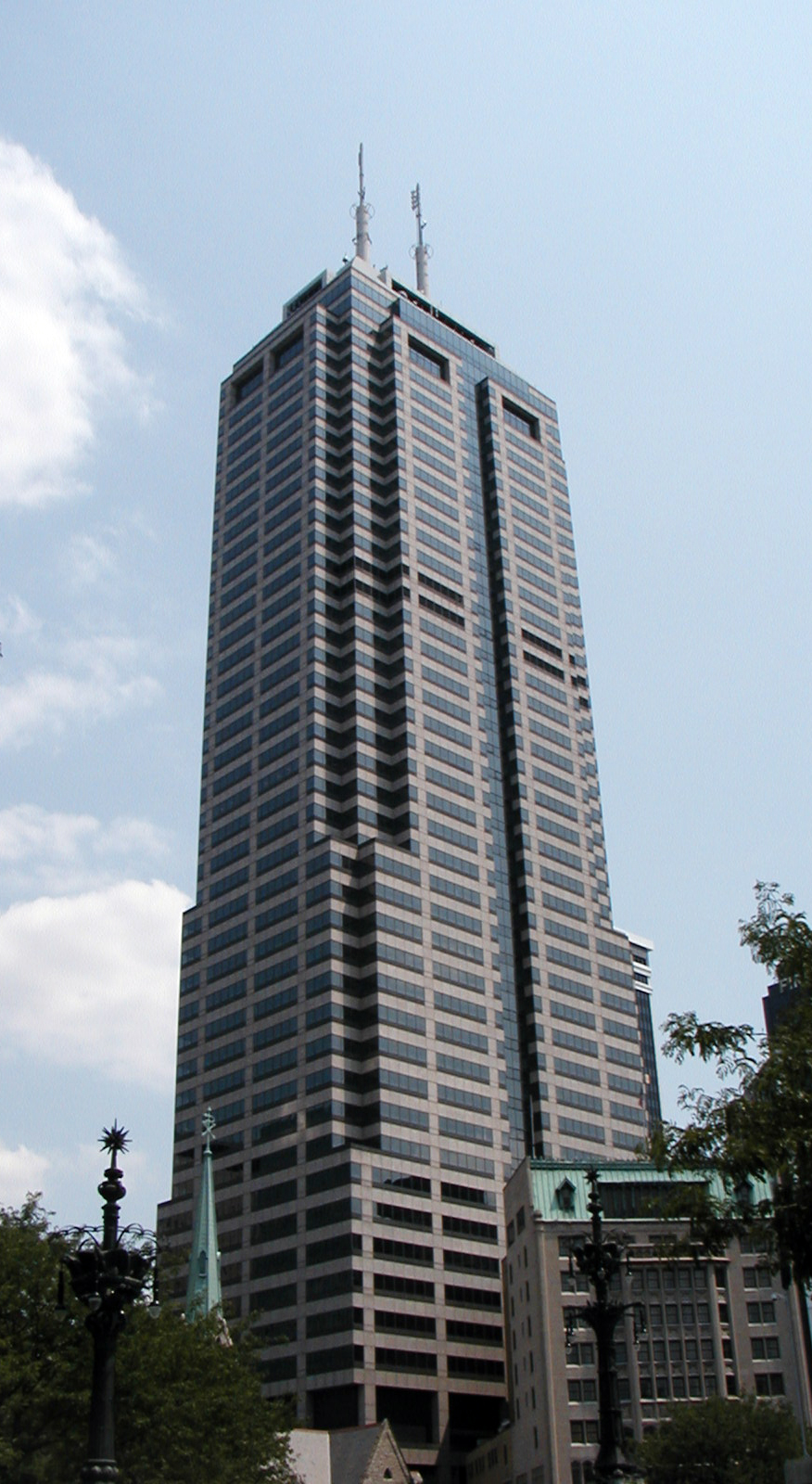
The former Bank One Tower

In May 1986, it was announced that AFC was going to merge with the Columbus, Ohio-based Banc One Corporation for $597.3 million in stock with American Fletcher National Bank being renamed Bank One Indianapolis and American Fletcher Corporation renamed Banc One, Indiana Corporation.

The other subsidiary banks, Union Bank & Trust Co. of Franklin, First American National Bank of Plainfield, Carmel Bank & Trust Co., and Citizens Northern Bank of Elkhart were renamed Bank One Franklin, Bank One Plainfield, Bank One Carmel and Bank One Elkhart respectively.

The result gave American Fletcher executives 20% of the voting stock in the Banc One Corporation parent company and Frank E. McKinney Jr. became president of Banc One while still remaining as president and chairman of Banc One Indiana Corp. The merger was finalized on January 27, 1987. McKinney and two other directors of American Fletcher became directors of Banc One Corporation.

After the merger, the other banks that parent Banc One had previously acquired in the state of Indiana, such as Bank One Lafayette, Bank One Merrillville, Bank One Marion, Bank One Crawfordsville, Bank One Rensselaer, Bank One Richmond, and Bank One Bloomington, were placed under the supervision of Banc One Indiana Corporation.

In 1990, the 48-story Bank One Tower at 111 Monument Circle, the tallest building in the state of Indiana, was finally opened after 20 years of planning under American Fletcher.

By March 1997, Banc One completed the consolidation of the dozen or so individual Bank One banks, such as Bank One Indianapolis, Bank One Franklin, Bank One Bloomington, etc., to form a single statewide Bank One Indiana financial institution. Prior to the charter consolidation, customers of one Bank One bank could not access their accounts at a different Bank One bank in another county since the individually charter banks were separate legal entities.
