= Merchants National Corporation =

- Trade name: Merchants National Bank & Trust Company
- Type: Public
- Traded as: Nasdaq: MCHN (1972–1992)
- Industry: Banking
- Founded: March 1865; 161 years ago as Merchants National Bank & Trust Company in Indianapolis; January 3, 1972; 54 years ago as Merchants National Corporation
- Defunct: May 2, 1992; 34 years ago
- Fate: Acquired by National City Corporation
- Successor: National City Bank Indiana
- Headquarters: Indianapolis, Indiana, United States
- Area served: Indiana
- Products: Financial services
- Total assets: $5.7 billion (1992)
- Subsidiaries: Merchants National Bank & Trust Company

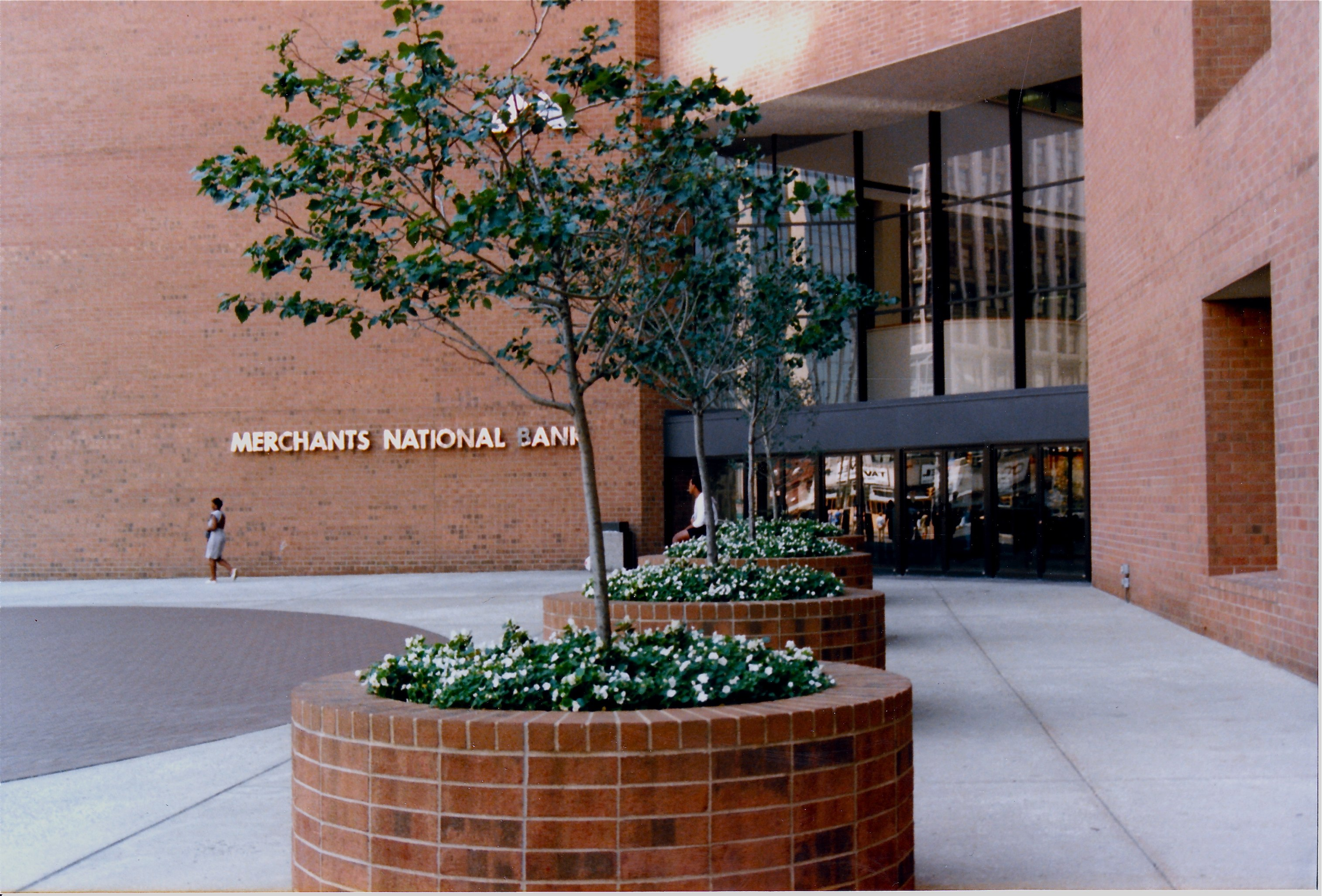
Merchants National Bank headquarters in Indianapolis in 1988.

Merchants National Corporation (MNC) was an Indianapolis-based statewide bank holding company that was one of the largest Indiana-based financial institutions at the time it was acquired by Ohio-based National City Corporation in 1992. Its primary subsidiary was the Indianapolis-based Merchants National Bank and Trust Company, which had been founded in 1865.

From the mid-1950s through the late 1980s, Merchants National Bank and Trust, American Fletcher National Bank, and Indiana National Bank, were the three largest banks in Indianapolis. Their holding companies—Merchants National Corporation, American Fletcher Corporation, and Indiana National Corporation (later named INB Financial Corporation)—were the three largest bank holding companies in the state.

== History ==
To allow it to acquire other banks and other financial related businesses, Merchants National Bank & Trust Company formed a holding company named Merchants National Corporation in January 1972.

=== Expansion outside Marion County ===
Until July 1, 1985, the state of Indiana did not permit bank branching across county lines nor bank ownership outside the bank holding company's home county. After that date, Indiana allowed very limited branching, but did allow the purchase of banks by holding companies anywhere in the state as long as total deposits that were controlled by a holding company did not exceed a ceiling which was initially set at 11 percent of all deposits held in Indiana banks.

MNC made its first expansion move outside of Marion County by announcing in June 1985, one month before the new cross-county bank laws went into effect, the pending acquisition of the Shelbyville-based Farmers National Corporation and its Farmers National Bank subsidiary for an undisclosed amount. The acquisition was completed in January 1986.

In July 1985, MNC announced the pending acquisition of the Greencastle-based Putnam National Corporation with its Central National Bank of Greencastle subsidiary for $7.3 million in stock and cash. The acquisition was completed in February 1986.

In September 1985, MNC announced the pending acquisition of the Greenfield-based Hancock Bancshares with its Hancock Bank & Trust Company subsidiary for $9.5 million in stock for the remaining 83% it did not owned after having purchased 17% of the firm in July. The acquisition was completed in April 1986.

In November 1985, MNC announced the pending acquisition of the Carmel-based US Bancorp with its Union State Bank subsidiary that was already controlled by the Frenzel family. The acquisition was completed in November 1986.

In December 1985, MNC announced the pending acquisition of the Anderson-based Anderson Banking Company for an undisclosed amount. The acquisition was completed in December 1986.

In January 1986, MNC announced the pending acquisition of the three month old Danville-based Alliance Bancorp with its Mid State Bank of Hendricks County subsidiary for an undisclosed amount. Alliance was the product of the recent merger between Danville State Bank and the First National Bank of Coatesville which had created the Mid State Bank of Hendricks County. The acquisition was completed in November 1986.

In February 1986, MNC announced the pending acquisition of the Greenwood-based NBG Financial Corporation with its Farmers National Bank subsidiary for $13.2 million in stock. The acquisition was completed in December 1986.

In March 1986, MNC announced the pending acquisition of the Seymour-based Mid-Southern Indiana Bancorp with its Seymour National Bank subsidiary for an undisclosed amount. The acquisition was completed in December 1986. This was Merchants first move outside the immediate area surrounding Marion County.

In April 1986, MNC announced two unrelated pending acquisitions of the Tipton-based Citizens National Bank of Tipton and the Zionsville-based and Frenzel family-controlled Farmers State Corporation with its Mid State Bank subsidiary, both for undisclosed amounts. The acquisition in Zionsville was completed in November 1986 while the acquisition in Tipton was completed in December 1986.

In August 1986, MNC announced the pending acquisition of the Connersville-based Fayette Bancorp with its Fayette Bank and Trust Company subsidiary for an undisclosed amount. The acquisition was completed in May 1987.

In December 1986, MNC announced the pending acquisition of the Madison-based Ohio Valley Bancorp with its Madison Bank & Trust Company subsidiary for an undisclosed amount. The acquisition was completed in September 1987. After National City acquired Merchants National, National City did not merge Madison Bank & Trust into National City, but decided the divest the bank 14 years later after determining that this bank did not fit in with the rest of the company. National City eventually sold Madison Bank & Trust to MainSource Financial Group in 2005 for an undisclosed amount.

In March 1987, MNC announced the pending acquisition of the Crawfordsville-based Elston Corporation with its Elston Bank & Trust Company subsidiary for $24 million. The acquisition was completed in February 1988.

In April 1988, MNC announced the pending acquisition of the Batesville-based Batesville State Bank for an undisclosed amount.

In July 1988, MNC announced the pending acquisition of the East Chicago-based Riley Corporation with its First National Bank of East Chicago subsidiary for an undisclosed amount. The acquisition was completed in November 1988.

In April 1989, MNC announced the pending acquisition of the Logansport-based First National Bankshares with its First National Bank of Logansport and the First National Bank of Indiana subsidiaries for $22.9 million. The acquisition was completed in October 1989.

=== National City Bank Indiana ===
In October 1991, National City Corporation announced that it was acquiring Merchants National Corporation with its lead bank Merchants National Bank and Trust Company of Indianapolis for $604 million in stock. The acquisition was completed in May 1992. Approximately 600 positions, mainly in Indianapolis, were eliminated as a direct result of the consolidation of mostly headquarters functions.
