= Tom Binford =

American businessman (1924–1999)

Thomas Wyatt Wilson Binford
- Born: April 6, 1924; Indianapolis
- Died: January 14, 1999 (aged 74); Indianapolis
- Burial place: Crown Hill Cemetery and Arboretum, Section 61, Lot 26; 39.8196247°N 86.1771826°W
- Education: Princeton University
- Occupations: Entrepreneur and philanthropist
- Known for: Acting President of Depauw University (1975-76); Chairman and CEO of Indiana National Corporation (1976–1981)

Thomas Wyatt Wilson Binford (April 6, 1924 – January 14, 1999) was an Indianapolis-based entrepreneur and philanthropist. One of Indianapolis' most influential men, Thomas W. Binford, was a pioneer, visionary, and civil rights leader. He participated in civic, philanthropic, cultural, and political aspects of the city and state and was valued for his sensitivity, wise counsel, personal and financial support, and sincerity. In addition to his many personal interests, Binford spearheaded a group to buy the Indiana Pacers basketball team in 1975 and served as its president and general manager for one year. From 1974 to 1995, Binford served as the Chief Steward of the Indianapolis 500, presiding over its transition from United States Auto Club governance to Indy Racing League governance.

== Biography ==
Binford attended Princeton University, where he was a member of Phi Beta Kappa. He was interim president of DePauw University in 1975–76. Although he did not have any prior banking experience, Binford was elected chairman and chief executive officer of Indiana National Corporation, the holding company for the largest bank in the state of Indiana, from 1976 to 1981, turning the company around after it lost money during the 1973–75 recession. He was instrumental in bringing the Colts to Indianapolis. His greatest contribution was creating an environment in the city of Indianapolis where issues of civil rights and race could be discussed productively and without rancor. A street in northeastern Indianapolis was renamed Binford Boulevard in his honor.

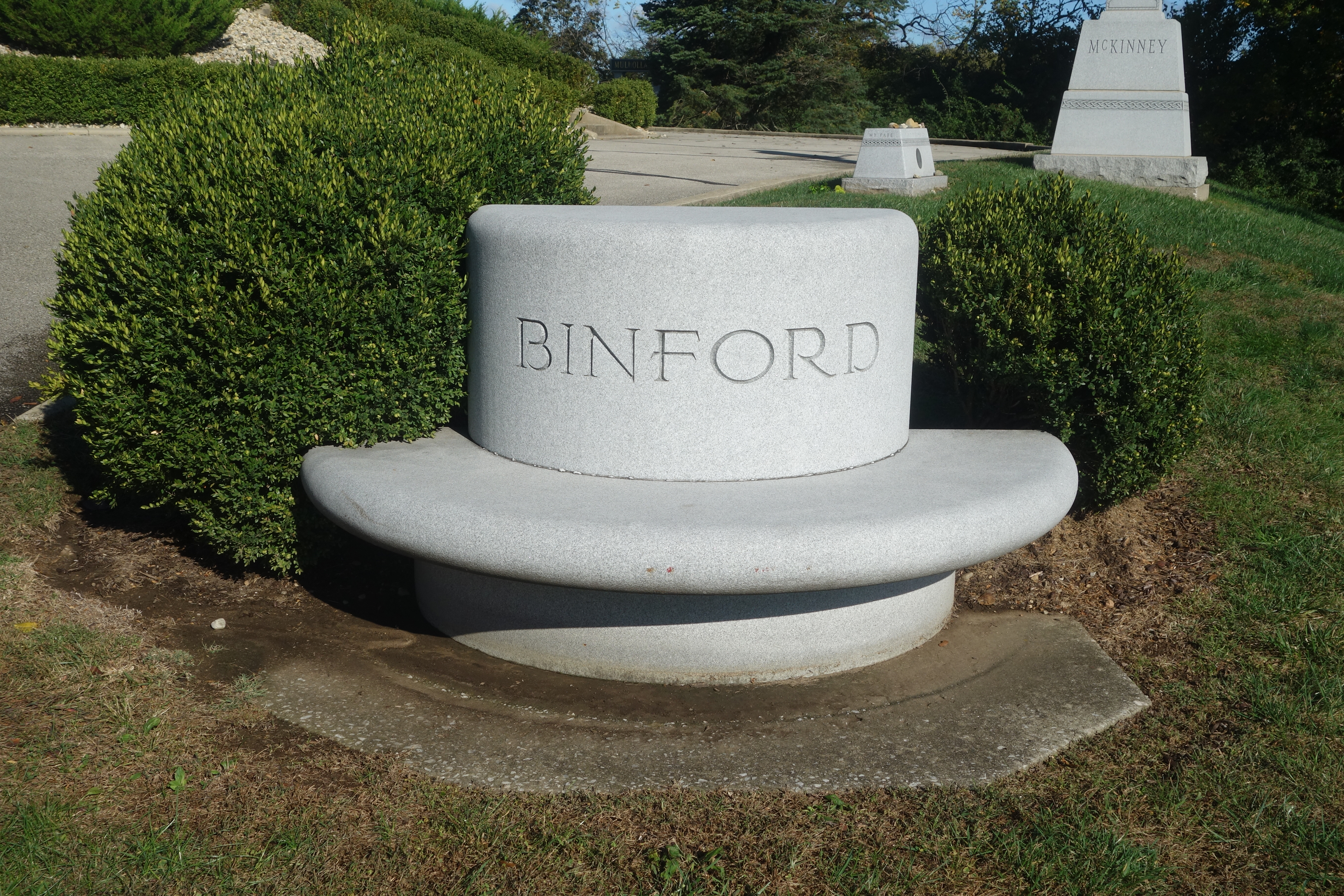
The burial site of Tom Binford in Crown Hill Cemetery in Indianapolis.

Binford began serving as chief steward during the 1973 Indianapolis 500. In 1978, Binford was a candidate in the FISA presidential election but lost the election to Jean-Marie Balestre by 29 votes to 11. His most notable races include the 1981 Indianapolis 500 and the 1995 Indianapolis 500. Binford penalized Bobby Unser one lap for illegal passes under a caution in 1981. His penalty was overruled by a USAC appeals board five months later. In 1995, Binford penalized Jacques Villeneuve early in the race for a restart violation and later gave a stop-and-go penalty to Scott Goodyear after Goodyear passed the pace car on the final restart. The 1995 race was his last as chief steward before retiring in 1996.

Binford suffered a cerebral hemorrhage while he was at his office in Indianapolis and later died at Methodist Hospital. He is buried at Crown Hill Cemetery in Indianapolis.
