= Indy Pride Festival =

Annual LGBT festival in Indianapolis, Indiana, US

- Main Stage, 2007
- Genre: LGBTQ, pride parade
- Location: Indianapolis, Indiana
- Attendance: 95,000
- Organiser: Indy Pride, Inc.

Indy Pride Festival (formerly Circle City IN Pride) is the annual week of LGBT pride events in Indianapolis. The week is organized by LGBTQ organization Indy Pride, Inc., and has been held under this name and organization for over a decade. In recent years, more than 95,000 gay, lesbian, bisexual, transgender and heterosexual people have attended the festival. Indy Pride's Parade and Festival is held the 2nd Saturday in June, with a week of events leading up to it, in honor of the Stonewall Riots and in accordance with other United States pride festivals. Indy Pride Festival is the largest LGBT pride event in Indiana.

According to former Indy Pride President, Gary Brackett, "The festival and events are to celebrate gay pride and bring the community together. We're trying to bring visibility to the greater Indianapolis community of how many gay, lesbian, bisexual and transgender people there are here."

== Background ==
The first known Pride week in Indianapolis was celebrated in 1976 with the support of Metropolitan Community Church and Gay Peoples Union. However, the first Indy Pride, Inc., sponsored event began in 1996 as a week-long celebration of events. Jeffrey Cleary and Bill McKinley served as Co-Chairs for the city's first ever pride week. The celebration held 10 events in seven days, culminating with a pride fair on the downtown Indy Canal. In 2011, the festival broke records by attracting a record estimate 70,000 attendees. In 2012, the week of events opened with the new "Rainbow 5k Run/Walk". The festival saw the addition of a 2nd stage, as well as an expansion in family-friendly entertainment. Attendance grew every year in the following decade until 2020 and 2021 when the event was not held in person due to the COVID-19 pandemic.

=== Anti-Pride protests and opposition ===
In a 2016 interview, Gary Brackett acknowledged that a few protestors oppose the event every year. According to Brackett, both the crowd and the anti-Pride protestors have received police protection.

== Festival ==
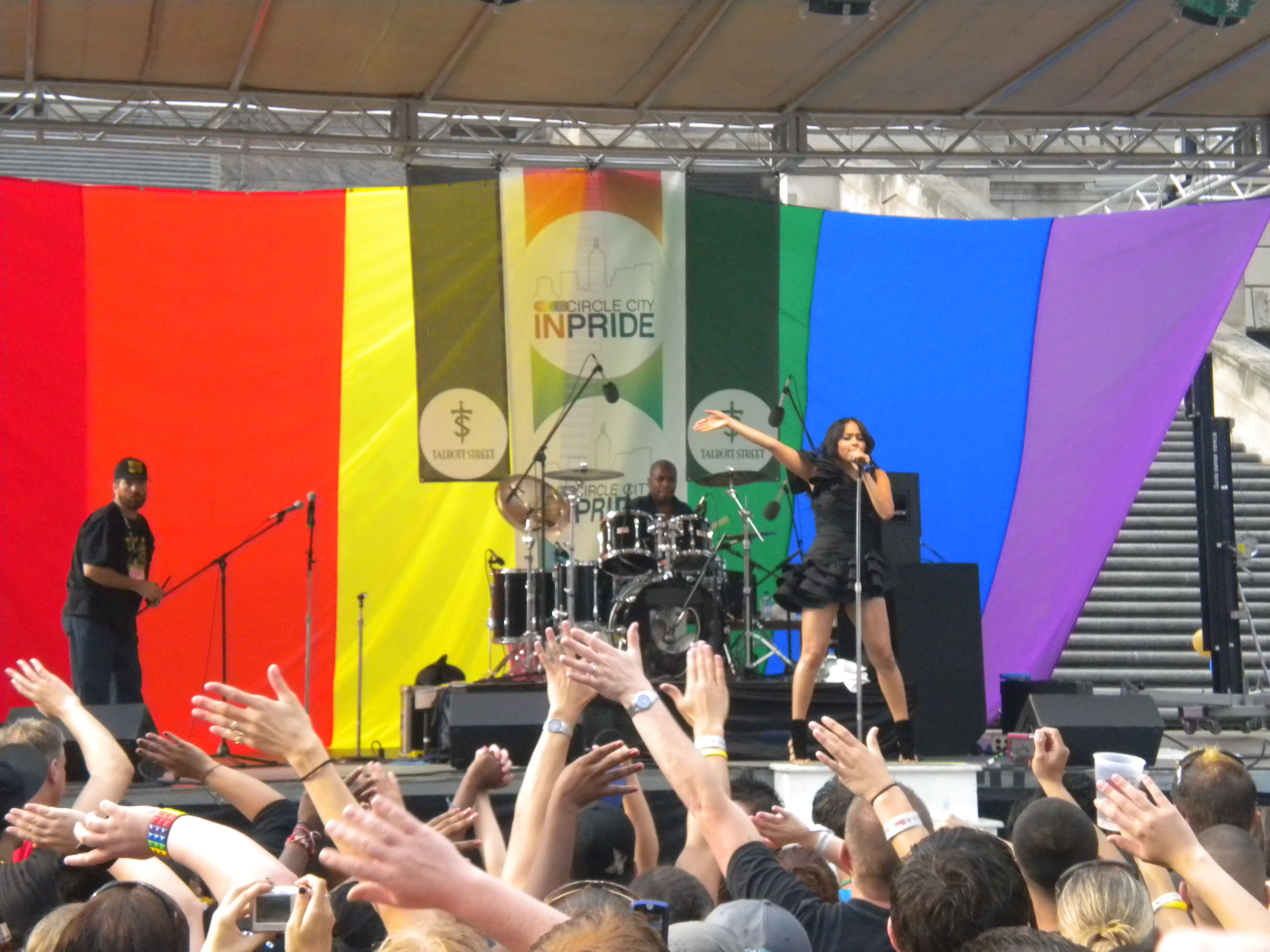
Live entertainment during the 2009 festival

The festival includes several attractions for the LGBT community and allies, to browse and watch. Local LGBTQ groups and supportive businesses sponsor booths catering to the community as a whole, as well as special interest groups. Surrounding the park, food vendors and other businesses also set up displays to show support and to market to the community. The main stage overlooks the event and serves as a centerpiece for the festival. National and local talents provide performances from the stage. Performances have included the Pride of Indy Band, singers, national recording artists, drag performances, DJs, and speeches.

Performances have ranged from pure entertainment, such as RuPaul who performed at the close of the festival in 2006 and Kat DeLuna who performed in 2009, to informational speeches, such as from Candace Gingrich, who in 2007, gave a speech for the Human Rights Campaign on same-sex marriage issues. In 2012, the festival added a 2nd stage dedicated to DJs and dance music, as well as an area designated for family friendly entertainment.

== Parade ==
The inaugural Indy Pride Parade (formerly known as the Cadillac Barbie Pride Parade) occurred on Saturday, June 14, 2003, in the Mass Ave Cultural Arts District. The parade route extended southwest on Massachusetts Avenue from its intersection with St. Clair Street and College Avenue to Vermont Street, terminating at University Park in downtown Indianapolis. The first parade was small with only eight participants and lasted 15 minutes. It has since grown into a 2-hour-plus-long event. By 2009, the parade had grown to include more than 100 floats and participants.

The parade was suspended in 2020 and 2021 due to the COVID-19 pandemic in Indiana.

=== Grand marshals ===
- 2006: Julia Carson
- 2007: Del Shores
- 2009: Broadway cast of Wicked
- 2010: Indy Bag Ladies
- 2011: Cadillac Barbie (Gary K. Brackett)
- 2012: Jordan Windle
- 2013: Indiana Youth Group
- 2014: Layshia Clarendon, Coburn "Coby" Palmer, Megan Roberson, and Rick Sutton
- 2015: Greg Ballard
- 2016: Alice Langford and Betty Wilson
- 2017: Chris Paulsen and Deanna Medsker
- 2018: Finley C. Norris Margaret Irish, Mark A. Lee, Terrell Parker, Jenna Scott, and Wes Scott
- 2019: Shelly Fitzgerald, J. D. Ford, Trinity Haven, and Low Pone
- 2022: Trans Solutions Research & Resource Center, GenderNexus, ACLU of Indiana, Indianapolis City-County Council members Zach Adamson, Ali Brown, Ethan Evans, and Keith Potts
- 2023: David Hochoy and Parents of Trans Youth
- 2024: No publicized Grand Marshals

== Attendance ==
Total estimated annual attendance of the parade and festival.

Year	Location(s)	Attendance
2002		2,000
2003		
2004		
2005		25,000
2006	University Park; Garfield Park	25,000
2007	University Park	30,000
2008	University Park	35,000
2009	University Park	45,000
2010	American Legion Mall	55,000
2011	American Legion Mall; Veterans Memorial Plaza	70,000
2012	American Legion Mall; Veterans Memorial Plaza	80,000
2013	American Legion Mall; Veterans Memorial Plaza	85,000
2014	American Legion Mall; Veterans Memorial Plaza	95,000
2015	American Legion Mall; Veterans Memorial Plaza	106,000
2016	American Legion Mall; Veterans Memorial Plaza	110,000
2017	Military Park	
2018	Military Park	
2019	Military Park	
2020	held virtually due to COVID-19 pandemic	40,000
2021	held virtually due to COVID-19 pandemic	
2022	Military Park	100,000
2023	Military Park	32,000—35,000
2024	Military Park	

== See also ==
- Indy Pride
- List of LGBT events
- Pride of Indy Band and Color Guard
- List of attractions and events in Indianapolis
