= Indy Pride =

LGBTQ organization in Indianapolis, Indiana

- Indy Pride, Inc.
- Predecessor: Justice, Inc.
- Established: 1995; 31 years ago
- Type: Nonprofit
- Registration no.: 35-1951286
- Legal status: 501(c)(3) organization
- Purpose: LGBTQ+ support
- Headquarters: Indianapolis, Indiana, U.S.
- Region served: Central Indiana
- Members: 638 (2018)
- Executive Director: Shelly Snider
- Revenue: $695,225 (2018)
- Expenses: $636,771 (2018)
- Staff: 2 (2022)
- Volunteers: 400+ (2018)
- Website: indypride.org

Indy Pride is a nonprofit 501(c)(3) organization based in Indianapolis, Indiana. It is a community-based, non-profit organization that seeks "to unite and serve its members and the LGBTQ community of Central Indiana through leadership development, educational and support programs, and community events that achieve inclusivity, equality, strong community connections, and awareness of LGBTQ issues." The organization started in 1995 as the coordinator of the city's annual gay pride parade and event—Indy Pride Festival—but later grew into an umbrella for multiple LGBT community entities, including the Chris Gonzalez Library and Archives, Indy Bag Ladies, and Indianapolis LGBT Film Festival.

== History ==
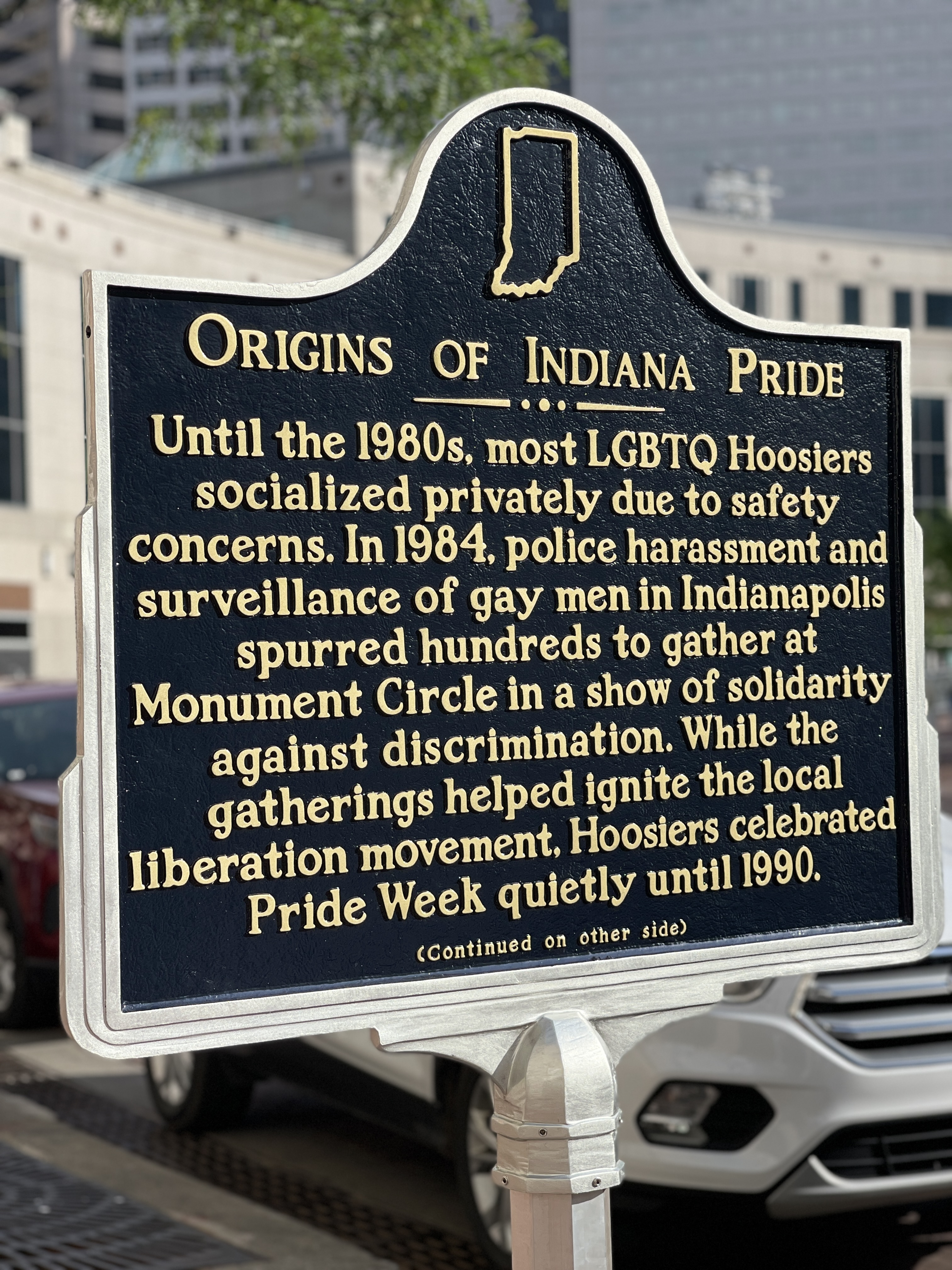
Side One of the Indiana Historical Marker (Installed 2022) commemorating the origins of Pride. Located on Monument Circle in Indianapolis.

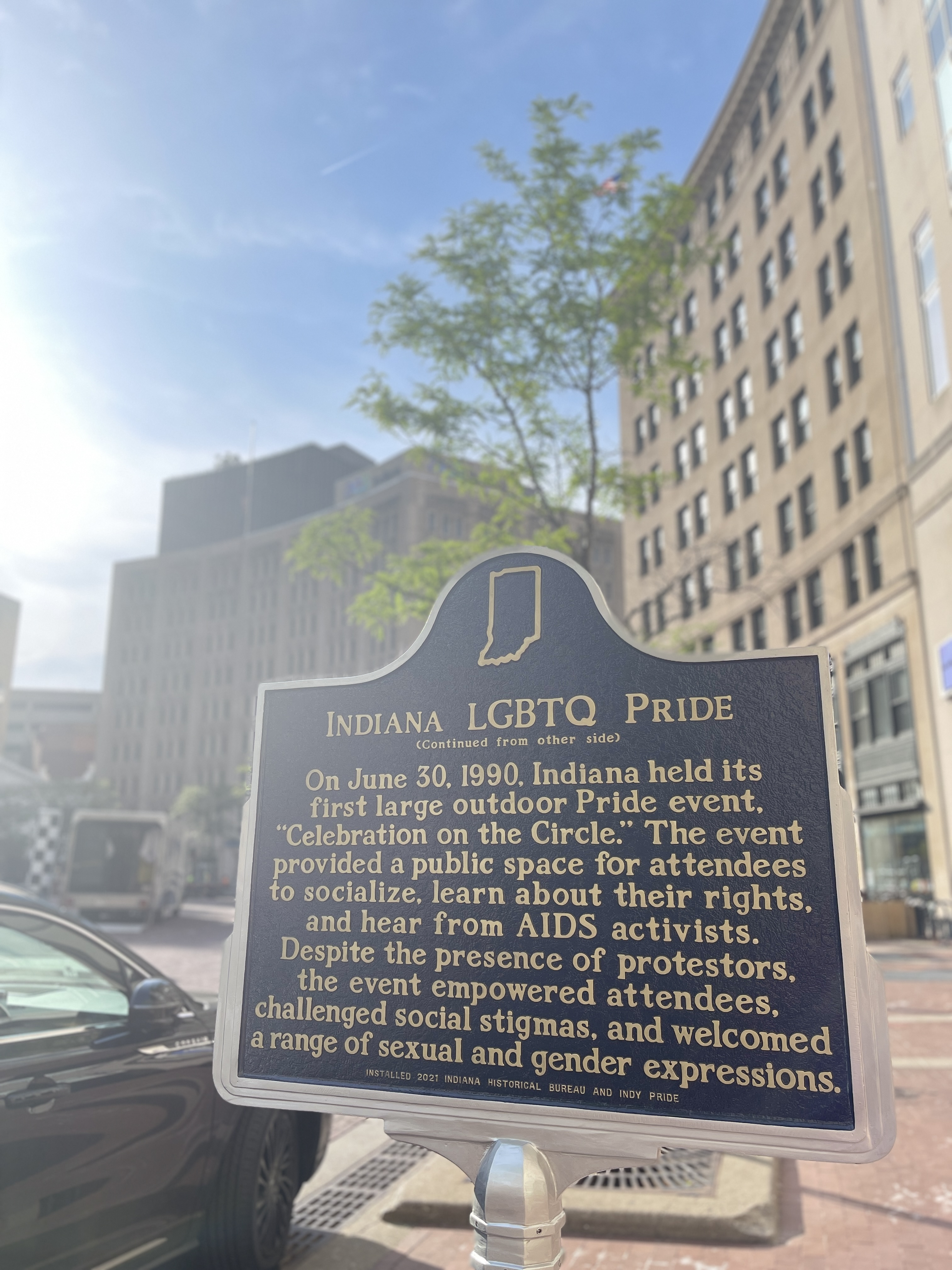
Side Two of the Indiana Historical Marker (Installed 2022) commemorating the origins of Pride. Located on Monument Circle in Indianapolis.

Before the creation of Indy Pride, Justice, Inc. held the first LGBTQ event held in a public space in June 1988. In 1990, they held Celebration on the Circle at Soldiers' and Sailors' Monument (Indianapolis), the largest Indianapolis LGBTQ event at that time. Indy Pride started in 1995 as an independent organization and coordinator of the Indy Pride Festival, and later received 501(c)(3) nonprofit status in 1997. They began negotiations in 1999 with Justice, Inc. to combine Pride events, with the two non-profits eventually merging in the mid-2000s.

In 1996, the organization began an annual scholarship program and the Community Thanksgiving Dinner. Between 2001 and 2003, the Indy Pride, Inc. event was moved to Massachusetts Ave as a Street Fayre. However, in 2003, under the leadership of Gary Brackett, the Street Fayre was replaced with a festival at University Park. Additionally, the Cadillac Barbie Pride Parade began in 2002, then named in honor of Gary Brackett's drag persona, a member of the Indy Bag Ladies. They eventually renamed the event the Indy Pride Parade in 2020. In 2005, the Pride of Indy Band and Color Guard was created, which in 2011 became its own 501(c)(3) nonprofit. In 2010, Indy Pride moved the event from University Park to War Memorial Plaza, renaming the festival the Circle City IN Pride in 2012.

Chris Handberg served as the first Executive Director of Indy Pride from 2017 to 2021. Shelly Snider was appointed Executive Director in 2022, becoming the first female executive director of Indy Pride.

== Events ==
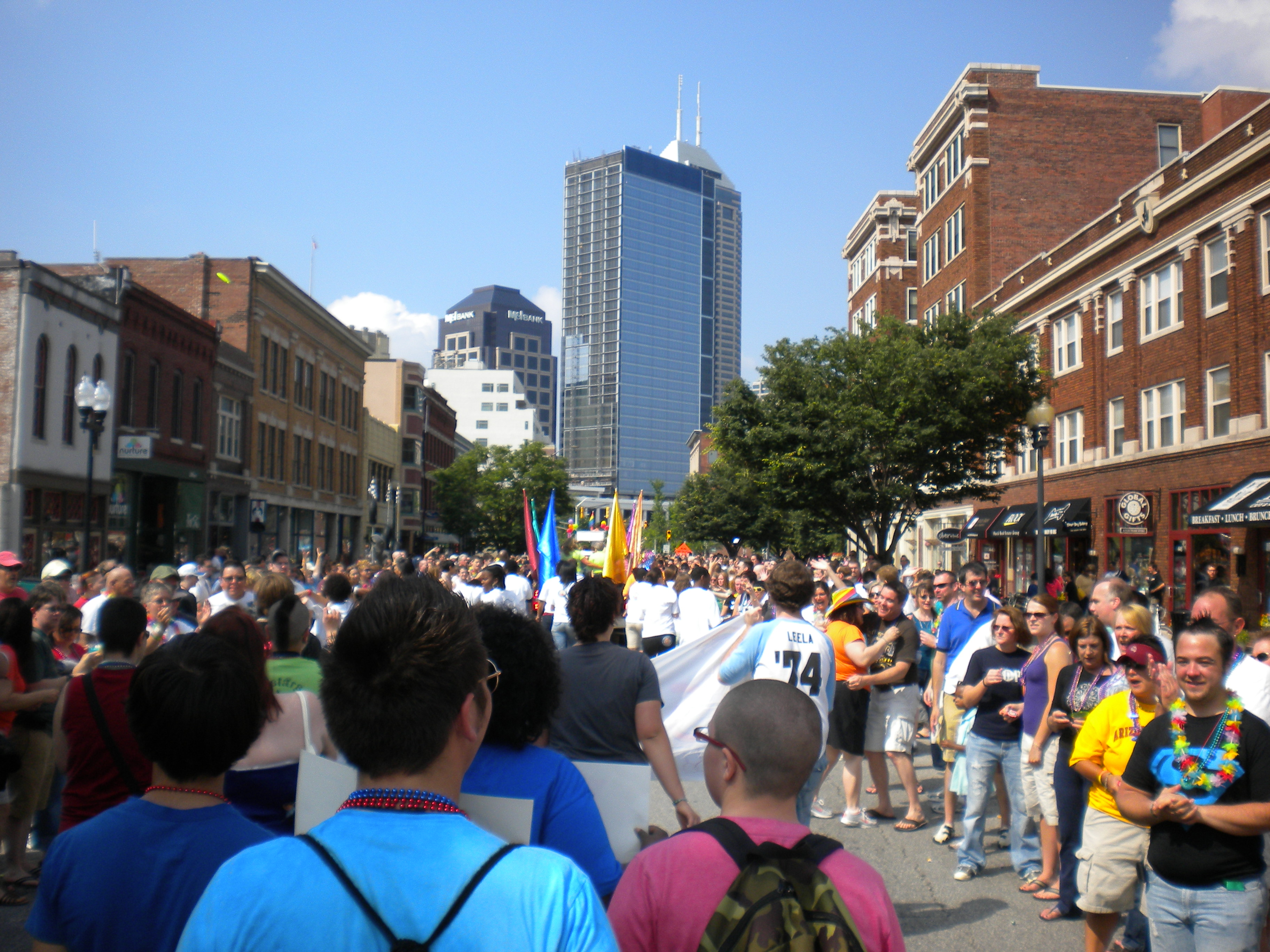
Indy Pride Parade in 2009

The all-volunteer organization puts on several yearly events, including Indy Pride Festival, Indianapolis LGBT Film Festival, Laugh OUT Loud, Community Thanksgiving Dinner, Hoosier 250 Tricycle Race, and Circle City Volleyball Tournament.

== Community support ==
The organization produces events and fundraisers, including through the Indy Pride Bag Ladies, which enables them to make significant monetary contributions to the Indiana LGBT community.

=== Grants ===
Indy Pride grants funds to many local non-profit organizations, including Gregory Powers Direct Emergency Financial Assistance Fund, Indiana Youth Group (IYG), Step-Up Inc., the Damien Center, and others.

=== Indy Pride Scholarship Program ===
The Indy Pride Scholarship Program was established as a way for Indy Pride to reward future and current students attending an accredited Indiana-based university or college who are making significant contributions to the Lesbian, Gay, Bisexual, Transgender, Questioning, and Straight Ally (LGBTQS) community through their academic pursuits. The scholarship also provides for those who identify as members of the LGBTQS community who have demonstrated a lack of support to attend an institute of higher education. The annual program began in the mid-late 1990s and continues today, with $16,000 awarded in 2018.

== Board of directors ==
The organization enlists an entire volunteer Board of Directors, including an Executive Board composed of a President, Vice-President, Secretary, and Treasurer. The Board also consists of 5-17 additional board members.

Board Presidents have included Jim Lasher (Chairman, 1994–1995), Linda Batchelor-Ballew (1995–2000), Ivan Howard (2000–2003), Gary Brackett (2003–2007), Scott VanKirk (2007–2011), Nicholas Murphy (2011–2014), Chris Morehead (2014–2015), Jason Nolen-Doerr (2015–2022), Jenny Boyts (2022–2024). Boyts is the first female board president, and she introduced Girl Pride as an Indy Pride event in 2022.

== See also ==
- List of LGBT-related organizations and conferences
