= Knechtges =

Knechtges is a surname. Notable people with the surname include:

- Dan Knechtges (fl. from 1994), American director and choreographer
- David R. Knechtges (born 1942), American sinologist
- Eric Knechtges (born 1978), American composer
