= Chris Gonzalez Collection =

Special collection in Indianapolis, Indiana, US

Coordinates: 39.778702°N 86.156990°W

- Established: 1993; 32 years ago
- Location: 40 E St Clair St, Indianapolis, IN 46204
- Collection size: Over 7,000 objects
- Founder: Michael Bohr
- Owner: Indianapolis Public Library
- Website: https://www.indypl.org/books-movies-music/special-collections/chris-gonzalez-collection

The Chris Gonzalez Collection, formerly the Chris Gonzalez Library and Archives, is a special collection housed at the Central Library of the Indianapolis Public Library in Indianapolis, Indiana, United States. The collection contains more than 7,000 materials focused on local and national LGBTQ+ issues and history. Its namesake, Christopher T. Gonzalez, was a local LGBTQ+ activist and founder of Indiana Youth Group. In 2019, Indy Pride partnered with the Indianapolis Public Library to open the collection to the public.

== Creation ==
The brainchild of Michael Bohr, a lifelong resident of Indianapolis and graduate of Brebeuf Jesuit Preparatory School, 1966 and Xavier University, 1970, started the archive in 1993 with the donation of his personal collection, which contained 1,600 books and other memorabilia of gay life in Indianapolis. During the 1980s and 1990s, acquired immune deficiency syndrome (AIDS) took the lives of many friends of Bohr's, and, thus, served as a catalyst in the creation of the library. Additionally, Bohr's awareness of other LGBT libraries, particularly the Gerber/Hart Library in Chicago served as inspiration for establishing a library in his hometown of Indianapolis.

== Collection ==
From the beginning, Bohr's inclination was to collect and preserve the history of gay life in Indianapolis. Thus, by erecting the Chris Gonzalez Library and Archives, it became the place that espouses and commemorates the lives of same gender loving people and a repository of LGBT titles and memorabilia for generations to come. Gay and lesbian publications like The Mirror, The Works and The Screamer, which is believed to be the city's earliest gay publication serve as examples. The Screamer was published on mimeographed paper in 1966 and its writers worked undercover by using pseudonyms. The Bob and Margaret Green drag scene video collection is also included. Other notable items in the archive are a collection of more than 200 T-shirts from GBLT festivals and parades across the United States, artwork by local artists, LGBT paraphernalia, mementos, and rare LGBT collectibles.

== Development ==
The Chris Gonzalez Library and Archives became a reality in March 1995, in collaboration with Diversity, Inc., a now-defunct LGBT community center in Indianapolis. While Diversity's focus was on the future, serving as a public identified central clearinghouse for people who identify as gay, lesbian, bisexual and transgender, the library's role was to keep a shining light on the past. Between 1997 and 2007, the library went through several changes and a few different sponsors. Indeed, with no other alternatives, the collection was placed in storage for approximately a year. However, Bohr continued seeking additional collections and some were simply donated by people in the community.

In April 2008, Indy Pride forged a relationship with The Chris Gonzalez Library and Archives and became its sole benefactor. Indy Pride is a community-based, non-profit organization that seeks to "celebrate and educate others about the rich historical and cultural legacy of gay, bisexual and transgender peoples."

In 2017, Indy Pride gave the majority of the collection to the Indianapolis Public Library to make it more accessible to the public. Over 7,000 items were incorporated into the public library's collection at its flagship location, each marked with an identifying plaque inside. The grand opening in 2019 included the unveiling of a permanent display in the Simon Reading Room.

== Chris Gonzalez ==
The collection is named for Christopher T. Gonzalez, a local supporter and activist of gay and lesbian youth in Indiana. He is credited with establishing the Indiana Youth Group in 1987, an award-winning, non-profit organization that caters to gay, lesbian, bisexual, transgender, and questioning youth. He succumbed to AIDS in April, 1994 at age 30.
