= Lambda 10 Project =

Educational initiative

- Formation: 1995; 31 years ago
- Founder: Shane Windmeyer
- Location: Bloomington, Indiana, United States
- Parent organization: Indiana University Bloomington
- Affiliations: Campus Pride

The Lambda 10 Project is an American national clearinghouse of information about LGBT issues in American fraternities and sororities. The organization works "to heighten the visibility of LGBTQ Greek members and offers educational resources related to sexual orientation and the fraternity and sorority experience.

== History ==
In the 1990s, Shane Windmeyer, assistant director of student activities at the University of North Carolina at Charlotte began speaking at colleges about LGBTQ issues in fraternities and sororities. In 1995, Windmeyer formed and became the coordinator of The Lambda 10 Project at Indiana University Bloomington; it is currently housed in the IU Office of Student Ethics and Anti-harassment Programs and is overseen by the Lambda 10 Steering Committee.

Lambda 10 Project is an educational initiative of Campus Pride, a national nonprofit organization.

== Activities ==
The Lambda 10 Project provides an index of lecturers available for events; lists of Internet forums concerning LGBT Greek life; and a repository of magazine articles, websites, and pertinent news stories.

Working with the LGBT publisher Alyson Publications, the Lambda 10 Project compiled and released four anthologies of homosexual and bisexual students' Greek experiences, edited for Windmeyer, including Out on Fraternity Row: Personal Accounts of Being Gay in a College Fraternity in 1998. This was the first book to explore "the collective experience of sexual identity and fraternity life". It shared both homophobia and acceptance within Greek life.

== Publications ==
- Windmeyer, Shane L., and Freeman, Pamela (eds.). Out on Fraternity Row: Personal Accounts of Being Gay in a College Fraternity. Alyson Publications, 1998. ISBN 1-55583-409-4
- , Kim and Stevens, Annie (eds.). Out & About Campus: Personal Accounts by Lesbian, Gay, Bisexual & Transgender College Students. Alyson Publications, 2000. ISBN 1-55583-480-9
- Windmeyer, Shane L. and Freeman, Pamela W. (eds.). Secret Sisters: Stories of Being Lesbian and Bisexual in a College Sorority. Alyson Publications, 2001. ISBN 1-55583-588-0
- Windmeyer, Shane L. Brotherhood: Gay Life in College Fraternities. Alyson Books, 2005. ISBN 978-1-55583-856-0

== See also ==
- Gay–straight alliance
