= Christopher Gonzalez =

Christopher Gonzalez may refer to:

- Christopher González, a Jamaican artist
- Christopher T. Gonzalez, an American activist
- Chris Gonzalez, an American martial artist
- Christopher Gonzalez, an American gamer known as NYChrisG
