= Indianapolis Men's Chorus =

Musical group in Indianapolis, Indiana

The Indianapolis Men's Chorus is a nonprofit musical group composed of members who identify as male and serve as ambassadors for the LGBTQ community of Indianapolis. Founded as a gay men's chorus by the non-profit Crossroads Performing Arts, Inc., the group was essential to making gay Hoosiers more visible during early Indy Pride events. The group's choral director Michael Hayden is credited with diffusing a potentially violent protest in 1991. The Indianapolis Men's Chorus continues to work to positively represent the Indianapolis LGBTQ community and build bridges with allies and all Hoosiers through music.

== History ==
Jim Luce, Director of Crossroads Performing Arts, Inc. had been working towards the creation of an Indianapolis Men's Chorus since January 1990. The Chorus was intended to further the mission of Crossroads to “strengthen the spirit of pride within the gay/lesbian community, to build bridges of understanding with all people of Indiana, and to enable its audiences and the general public to perceive the gay/lesbian community and its members in a positive way. ”Crossroads began recruiting for the group that March and hired Butler University professor Michael Hayden as choral director in August. After auditions in September and October, the Chorus began practice October 14, 1990. They first performed December 16, 1990 at All Saints Episcopal Church. The Indianapolis Men's Chorus made their formal public debut at the Madam Walker Legacy Center on June 8, 1991.

== 1991 Gay Pride Performance ==
The Indianapolis Men's Chorus performed at the second Gay Pride event held at Monument Circle in Indianapolis in June 29, 1991. The atmosphere was hostile, even dangerous, as religious protestors arrived with baseball bats. As the protestors stormed the stage, Michael Hayden, the chorus director, made a split-second decision. He defused the tension by ordering his choir to sing the Star Spangled Banner. The protesters ultimately stopped and paid their respects to the anthem, and it was just enough pause to dull the escalating tension. In Hayden’s words, “We had sung them off the monument steps.” After the protesters exited the stage, events were able to carry on without further disruption. No arrests were made, and no violence occurred.

== 2011–present ==
The Indianapolis Men's Chorus "entertains, educates, and promotes inclusive community through musical excellence," according to their most recent mission statement. Greg Sanders has served as the group's artistic director since 2011 and within two years, ticket sales tripled. In 2015, the Indianapolis Men's Chorus broke off from Crossroads to become and independent nonprofit organization.

The chorus continues to perform at Indy Pride events. The group has also performed at the Circle of Lights annual Christmas celebration and Indy Fringe. They have appeared with the Indianapolis Symphony Orchestra and the Indianapolis Opera, among other prestigious groups.

According to the Arts Council of Indianapolis, through its music the Indianapolis Men's Chorus, "inspires diversity, equality and justice by bringing gay, lesbian, bisexual, transgendered persons and their allies together through the transformative power of music."
