= CBRH =

CBRH may refer to:

- CBRH (AM), a radio rebroadcaster (1170 AM) licensed to New Hazelton, British Columbia, Canada
- Corner Brook Regional High
