= National Association of GSA Networks =

American federation of gay-straight alliances

The National Association of GSA Networks is a nationwide federation of state-level gay–straight alliance networks. It was created in 2005 through Gay–Straight Alliance Network (GSA Network), a California non-profit organization that organizes gay–straight alliances in public and private schools in the state.

== Member GSA networks ==
- Center for Artistic Revolution (Arkansas)
- Alabama Safe Schools Coalition c/o Equality Alabama
- Wingspan (Arizona)
- GSA Network
- Colorado Gay–Straight Alliance Network and One Colorado
- True Colors (Connecticut)
- Florida Gay Straight Alliance Network c/o Equality Florida
- Georgia Safe Schools Coalition
- Supporting and Mentoring Youth Advocates and Leaders (SMYAL) (District of Columbia)
- Illinois GSA Network and Illinois Safe Schools Alliance
- Indiana Youth Group
- Iowa Pride Network
- Louisville Youth Group (Kentucky)
- GLSEN Southern Maine
- Massachusetts GSA Network c/o Massachusetts Commission on GLBT Youth
- Out For Good (Minnesota)
- Mississippi Safe Schools Coalition
- Missouri GSA Network (Missouri)
- HiTOPS (New Jersey)
- New Mexico GSA Network
- Long Island Gay and Lesbian Youth (New York)
- LGBT Center of Raleigh (North Carolina)
- Kaleidoscope Youth Center (Ohio)
- Oregon Safe Schools and Communities Coalition and Oregon Gay Straight Alliance Network
- Ally Safe Schools and Mazzoni Center (Pennsylvania)
- Youth Pride Rhode Island
- SC Equality (South Carolina)
- Eastern Tennessee GLSEN Chapter (Tennessee)
- Texas GSA Network
- Utah QSA Network
- Outright Vermont
- GLSEN Richmond (Virginia)
- Washington GSA Network and GLSEN Washington Chapter
- GSA For Safe Schools (Wisconsin)

== Initiatives ==
Gay–Straight Alliance Network holds both a GSA Advocacy & Youth Leadership Academy (GAYLA) and Queer Youth Advocacy Day (QYAD) each year.

The National Association holds an annual National Gathering for GSAs and Safe school coalitions.

== Website ==
- National Association of GSA Networks
