= Christopher T. Gonzalez =

LGBTQ+ activist in Indianapolis (1963–1994)

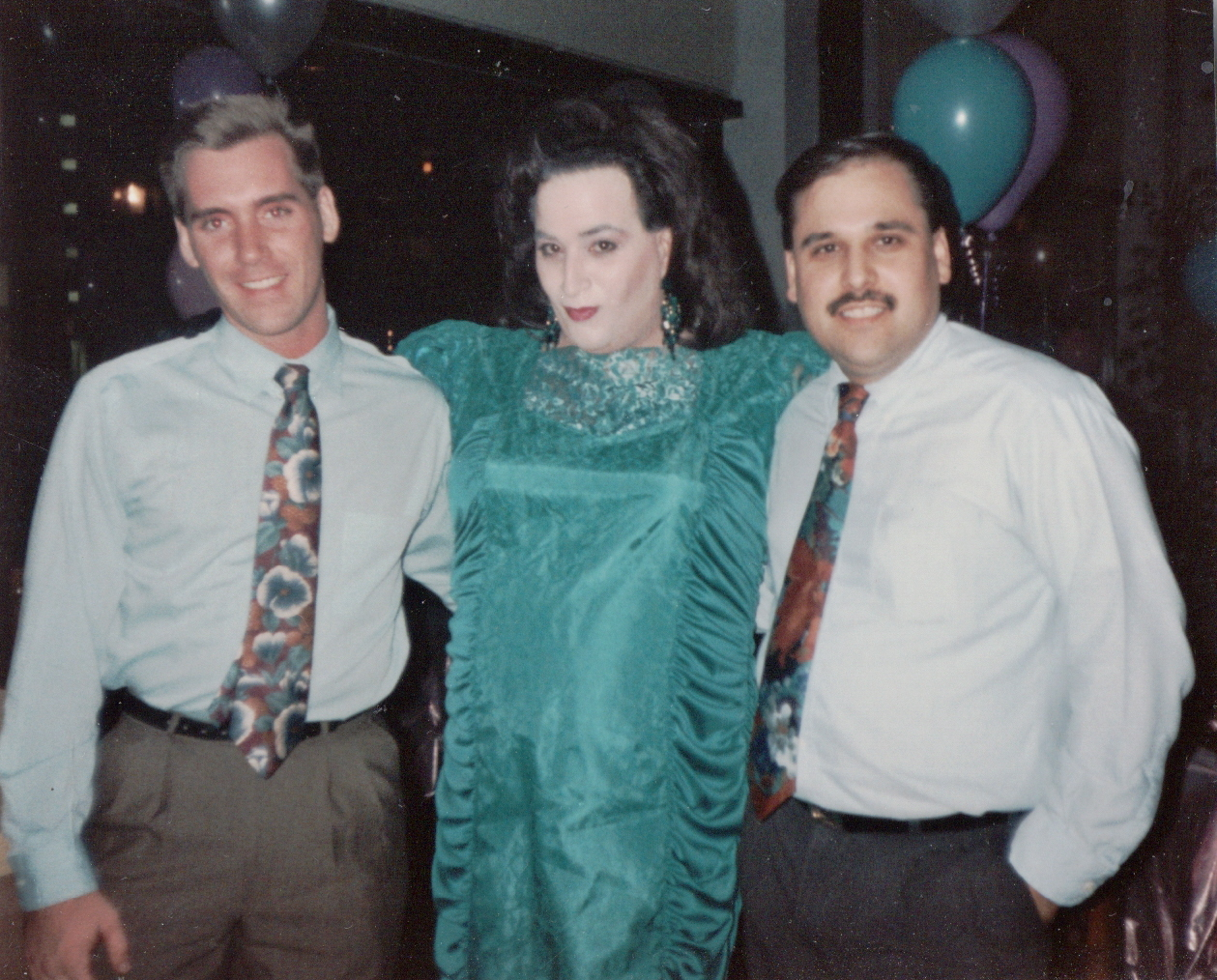
- Gonzalez, on the right, in 1992. His partner Jeff Werner is at left.
- Born: October 28, 1963; Griffith, Indiana, US
- Died: May 5, 1994 (aged 30)
- Education: Franklin College

Christopher T. Gonzalez, (known as Chris Gonzalez), was an LGBTQ+ rights activist from Indianapolis, Indiana. He founded the non-profit organization Indiana Youth Group (IYG), one of the first organizations in the country to support gay, lesbian, bisexual, and transgender youth.

== Early life ==
Gonzalez was born October 28, 1963, and grew up in Griffith, Indiana, in a traditional Hispanic family. He served as student council president at Griffith High School and was the voice behind morning announcements. Chris struggled with his sexuality in high school. Gonzalez attended Franklin College in the early 1980s, where he began volunteering for Gay/Lesbian Switchboard as a counselor; while there, he met his life partner Jeff Werner.

== Self-revelation and self-acceptance ==
By the time he completed his degree, Gonzalez had come to terms with his homosexuality. While he had been fearful of coming out to his parents, they were ultimately accepting.

Through his own struggles, Gonzalez realized the need for young LGBTQ+ individuals to have someone to talk to, which lead to him volunteering as a counselor for the Gay/Lesbian Switchboard in Indianapolis. During the early 1980s, the hotline was a link teens who were grappling with their sexuality, peer pressure, sexual identity, parents and family issues, etc. Through his work there, Gonzalez realized the support that LGBTQ+ youth needed, and reminded him of his own journey; he was unwilling to let the gay and lesbian-identified adolescents remain "stuck in a self-hatred kind of place."

== Creation of Indiana Youth Group ==
Founded in 1987 as a response to the needs of self-identified Lesbian, Gay, Bisexual, Transgender or Questioning youth, Indiana Youth Group (formerly known as Indianapolis Youth Group) held its first meeting in the living room of founders, Chris Gonzalez and Jeff Werner with support from Pat Jordan. After five years of operation, IYG was named a Special Projects of National Significance for its programs protecting the mental and physical health of Indiana's LGBT youth. For years, IYG operated an activity and program facility donated by the Health Foundation of Greater Indianapolis, which was renovated and maintained by community supporters. After fully appreciating and utilizing every square inch of that homelike space, IYG now occupies a 15,000 square foot Activity Center with room for large, medium and small groups, a spacious kitchen, education, art, and transitional apparel rooms. Youth with basic needs can access the pantry, showers, and laundry machines. Nationally recognized as the first nonprofit organization in the country specifically dedicated to gay and lesbian youth issues, IYG has garnered countless awards, grants, and state funding. In 1992, it was featured on ABC News program 20/20. IYG continues to operate the activity center and provides support groups and workshops on a variety of topics. Additionally, IYG fosters working relationships with high schools around the state to form and support gay–straight alliances.

== Legacy ==
Gonzalez was a person who fought for the rights of LGBT youth in Indiana and across the country. "Gonzalez made sure the national advocates heard the 'voices from the Heartland." In addition to his commitment to LGBT youth, he also worked with Latino youth at the Hispanic Center, Gays and Lesbians Working Against Violence and lobbied for an Indiana hate crimes bill.

He died of AIDS on May 5, 1994.

== See also ==
- Chris Gonzalez Collection
