= GSA Network =

Nonprofit organization

Genders and Sexualities Alliance Network (GSA Network)
- GSA Network logo
- Formation: 1998; 28 years ago
- Founder: Carolyn Laub
- Type: 501(c)(3)
- Tax ID no.: EIN 20-5367752
- Headquarters: Oakland, California
- Location: United States
- Co-executive directors: Ginna Brelsford; Geoffrey Winder
- Website: www.gsanetwork.org
- Formerly called: Gay-Straight Alliance Network

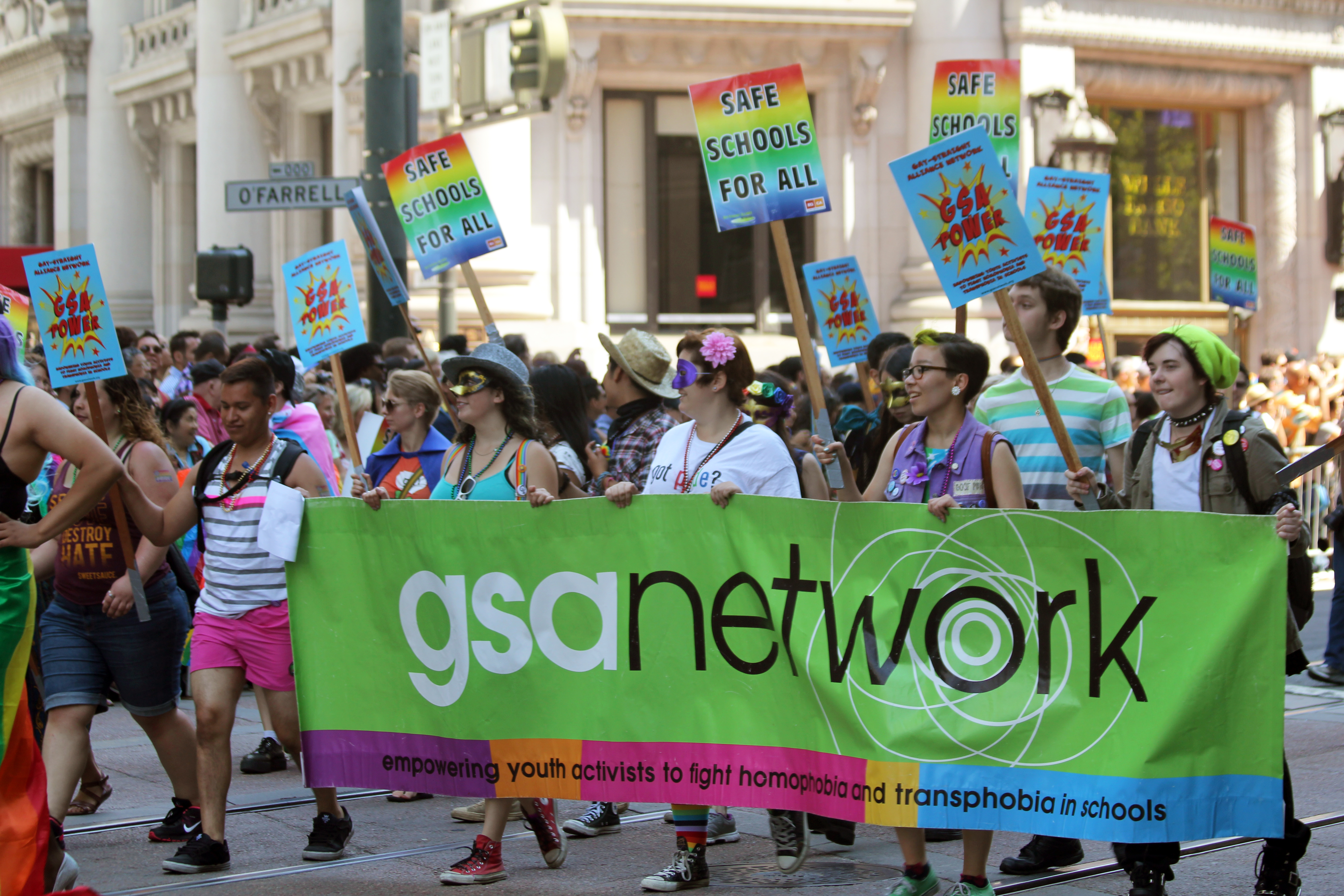
GSA Network supporters marching at San Francisco Pride 2013

GSA Network is a nonprofit organization that assists students with starting gay–straight alliances (GSA) to fight homophobia and transphobia in schools. Originally, GSA Network focused on supporting youth in California, and still has its headquarters in Oakland, California, but is now active nationwide.

== History ==
GSA Network was founded by Carolyn Laub in 1998, working with 40 GSA clubs in the San Francisco Bay Area. The organization expanded and in 2001, GSA Network became a statewide organization. In 2005, GSA Network began operating programs nationally. In 2008, GSA Network incorporated as a 501(c)(3) non-profit organization. Prior to that, GSA Network was a fiscally sponsored project of The Tides Center.

In 2015, Ginna Brelsford and Geoffrey Winder assumed the roles of co-executive directors of GSA Network.

In the spring of 2016, GSA Network changed its name from "Gay Straight-Alliance Network" to "Genders & Sexualities Alliance Network" to better reflect the diverse range of identities of the youth participating in its programming. At the same time, the organization adopted its current tagline: "trans and queer youth uniting for racial and gender justice."

GSA Network currently has staff based in Oakland, Fresno, and Los Angeles, California, as well as New Orleans, Louisiana, and Chicago, Illinois.

== Programs ==
Current GSA Network activities and programs include:

Supporting GSAs
Helps students start GSA clubs and provides resources and opportunities for GSAs to network and receive support. As of 2012, there are over 880 GSA clubs in California alone.

Student leadership training
Provides students with training on most effective ways to operate a GSA club.

Safe schools advocacy
Helps GSA clubs become activist clubs that can educate teachers and students to improve the school climate.

Public policy advocacy in California
The organization supports youth-led advocacy by providing resources to help address issues related to creating safer schools and advocating for non-discrimination laws.

Supporting the national GSA movement
Helps build the capacity of organizations in the United States to network and support GSAs in states other than California. As of 2012, 37 states have organizations in the National Association of GSA Networks.

#GSAs4Justice campaign
Supports student advocacy for school districts to adopt recommendations around restorative justice and push back against punitive discipline policies that create a school-to-prison pipeline for youth of color, youth with disabilities, and lesbian, gay, bisexual, and transgender (LGBT) youth.

== See also ==
- LGBTQ rights in the United States
- LGBTQ youth vulnerability
- List of LGBT rights organizations
