= Supporting Our Youth =

Canadian LGBT+ organization

- Abbreviation: SOY
- Formation: 1998; 28 years ago
- Type: LGBTQ organization
- Location: Toronto, Ontario, Canada
- Parent organization: Coalition for Services for Lesbian and Gay Youth (1998–2000); Central Toronto Youth Services (2000–2004); Sherbourne Health Centre (2004–)

Supporting Our Youth (SOY) is an organization based in Toronto, Ontario, Canada, which runs programs and events geared to supporting the special needs of gay, lesbian, bisexual, transgender, transsexual and intersex youth. SOY gets support and involvement from local youth and adults that volunteer their time to help improve each other’s lives. SOY’s main focus points are helping the youth create healthy arts, recreational spaces, culture, supportive housing, and employment.

== History ==
In 1991 a network of social professionals, health care providers, educators, youth, parents and activists joined to form the Toronto Coalition for Lesbian, Gay and Bisexual Youth. After conducting a six-month study to determine the needs of the queer community, the Supporting Our Youth project was launched in April 1998. The program was developed after an extensive series of consultations with LGBTQ youth in Toronto found that, while youth felt that they had adequate access to counselling services through their schools and Family Service Toronto, they had a strong desire for more social programming and more activities targeted to youth as an "entry point" to the LGBTQ community.

SOY was funded by the Trillium Foundation, and was originally meant to serve as a three-year community development project whose purpose was to create opportunities for LGBT youth in the areas of recreational activities, culture and arts, employment, housing and mentoring projects.

In September 2004, SOY became a program of the Sherbourne Health Centre.

== Programs ==
The organization runs a variety of programs, including Alphabet Soup, a drop-in for teenagers; the Black Queer Youth Initiative, a group targeted to LGBT Black Canadian youth; Express, a group for immigrant and refugee youth; Essence, a personal development group; Fluid, a group for youth who are pansexual, omnisexual, bisexual and questioning who do not fit into other sexuality categories; Trans_Fusion Crew, a group for transgender youth; and Pink Ink, a creative writing group. As well, SOY offers a Monday Night Drop In for social activities; the Bill 7 Award, an academic scholarship for LGBTQ university students; Click, a mentoring program; Shift, a photography project; Fruit Loopz, a youth-oriented arts and music event held at Buddies in Bad Times as part of Toronto's Pride Week; and the Pride Prom, held in conjunction with the Triangle Program as an annual prom for LGBT high school students.

The group also offers employment assistance programs for youth, as well as assisting in finding emergency housing for homeless LGBTQ youth. The group was consulted in the creation of Sprott House, Toronto's first dedicated homeless shelter for LGBTQ youth.

In 2012, the group won the City of Toronto Arts for Youth Award to honour its arts-based programming.
