= Indy Bag Ladies =

American activist organization

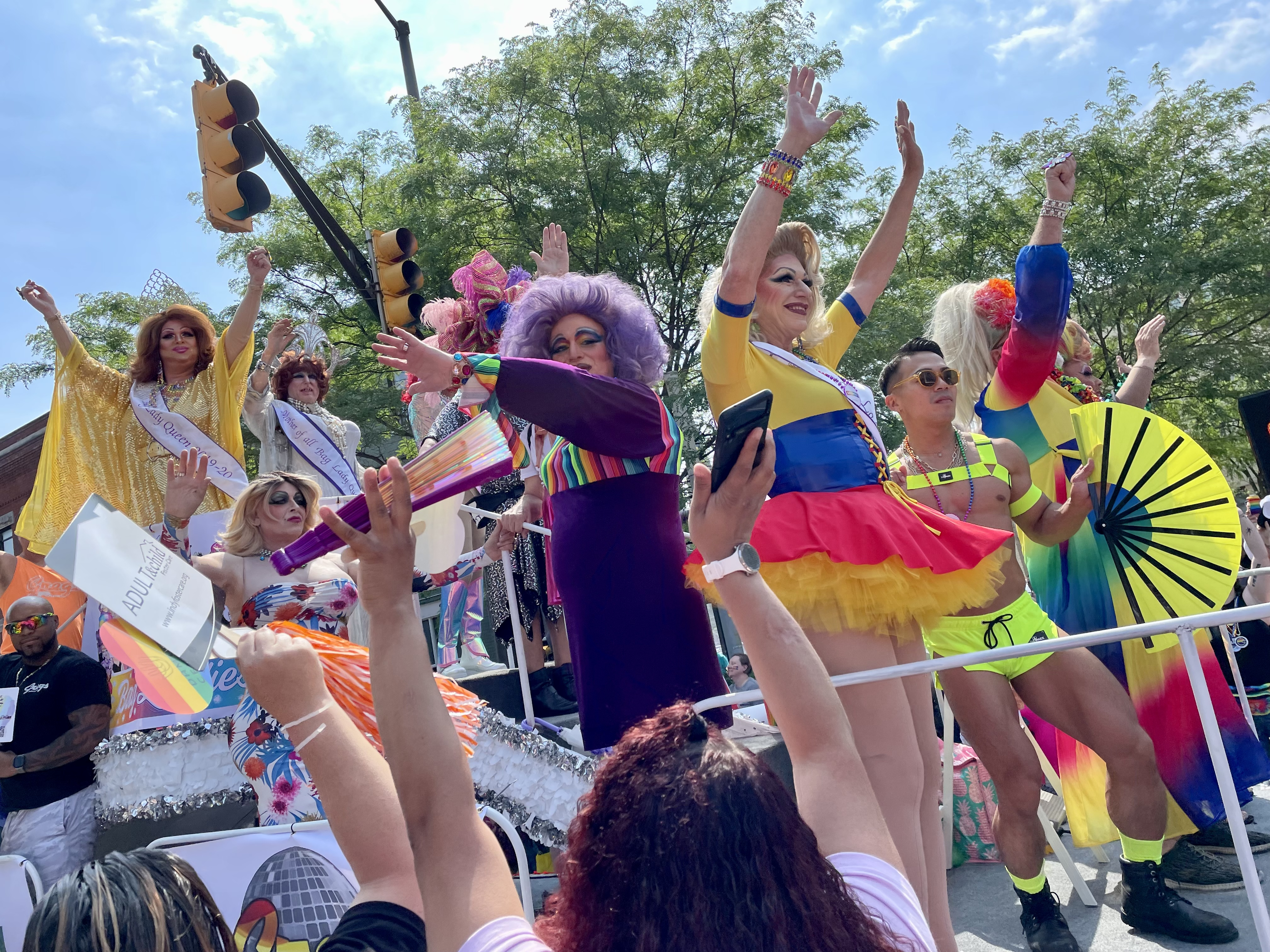
- Indy Bag Ladies Float at the 2022 Indy Pride Parade in Indianapolis, Indiana, USA
- Formation: October 31, 1981; 44 years ago
- Headquarters: Indianapolis, Indiana
- Website: https://www.indybagladies.org/

The Indy Bag Ladies is an activist organization that raises funds for care and treatment for individuals with Acquired Immunodeficiency Syndrome (AIDS) in Indianapolis, Indiana. Along with fundraising, the Indy Bag Ladies raise awareness of safe sex practices to in order to prevent sexually transmitted infections (STIs), and increase visibility and promote equality for LGBTQ+ individuals in Indiana through education and advocacy. The Bag Ladies are mostly men whom dress in ostentatious outfits, also known as Drag queens, to provide entertainment while raising money for the Indianapolis LGBTQ+ community.

== History ==
The Bag Ladies began in 1981 by Gary Johnson, Coby Palmer, and Ed Walsh when they found out their usual Halloween plans had been cancelled. They decided to put on their own event instead, using brown paper bags to invite participants to tour restaurants and bars in Indianapolis by a chartered bus while dressed in drag. The first tour visited establishments such as Hunt and Chase, Talbott Street Nightclub and Shirley's One Way. During the "Bag Lady Bus Tour" participants dressed in drag and carried bags of costumes in order to change periodically throughout the event. About 70 attendees attended the first outing. In 1982, while Palmer was in New York City, he was made aware of the growing AIDs crisis while visiting the Gay Men's Health Crisis (GMHC), an NYC based organization dedicated to supporting those diagnosed with HIV/AIDS. After the visit, Palmer, Walsh, and Johnson decided the Bag Ladies Bus Tour's second year would be a fundraiser for GMHC and an opportunity to spread the word in Indiana about the new disease. The ladies carried extra bags to collect monetary donations which they split between local organizations and GMHC, during the event they raised $2,000.

Edmond Talucci served as the first president of the Bag Ladies organization. In the early years, the Bag Ladies would host other events as well, like cookbook sales, photo signings, and they helped organize the Garage Party which took place in a downtown Indianapolis parking garage. The Indy Bag Ladies may possibly be one of the oldest fundraising organizations for HIV/AIDS in the United States.

The Indy Bag Ladies are also known for Drag Story Hour, a monthly event where drag queens read to youth in Indianapolis. In 2023, there had been a bomb threat made against a local bookstore, Indy Reads, for hosting Drag Story Hour.

== Fundraising ==
The Bag Ladies focus their fundraising efforts on people living with HIV/AIDS in Indiana, primarily donating to the Gregory Powers Direct Emergency Financial Assistance Fund (established through The Health Foundation of Greater Indianapolis) and Indiana AIDS fund. While primarily focused on individuals living with HIV/AIDS, the bag ladies have supported other causes like the Cystic Fibrosis Foundation, the Indiana Youth Group, The Coby Palmer Food Pantry, and The Julian Center. The group supported establishment of the Buddy Program and Buddy House, programs created to help those diagnosed with AIDS which offered assistance to meet everyday needs. They also provided funding to assist the creation of the Damien Center, a community organization established to support individuals and their families through AIDs diagnosis and death. Today, the organization focuses specifically on HIV prevention and care.

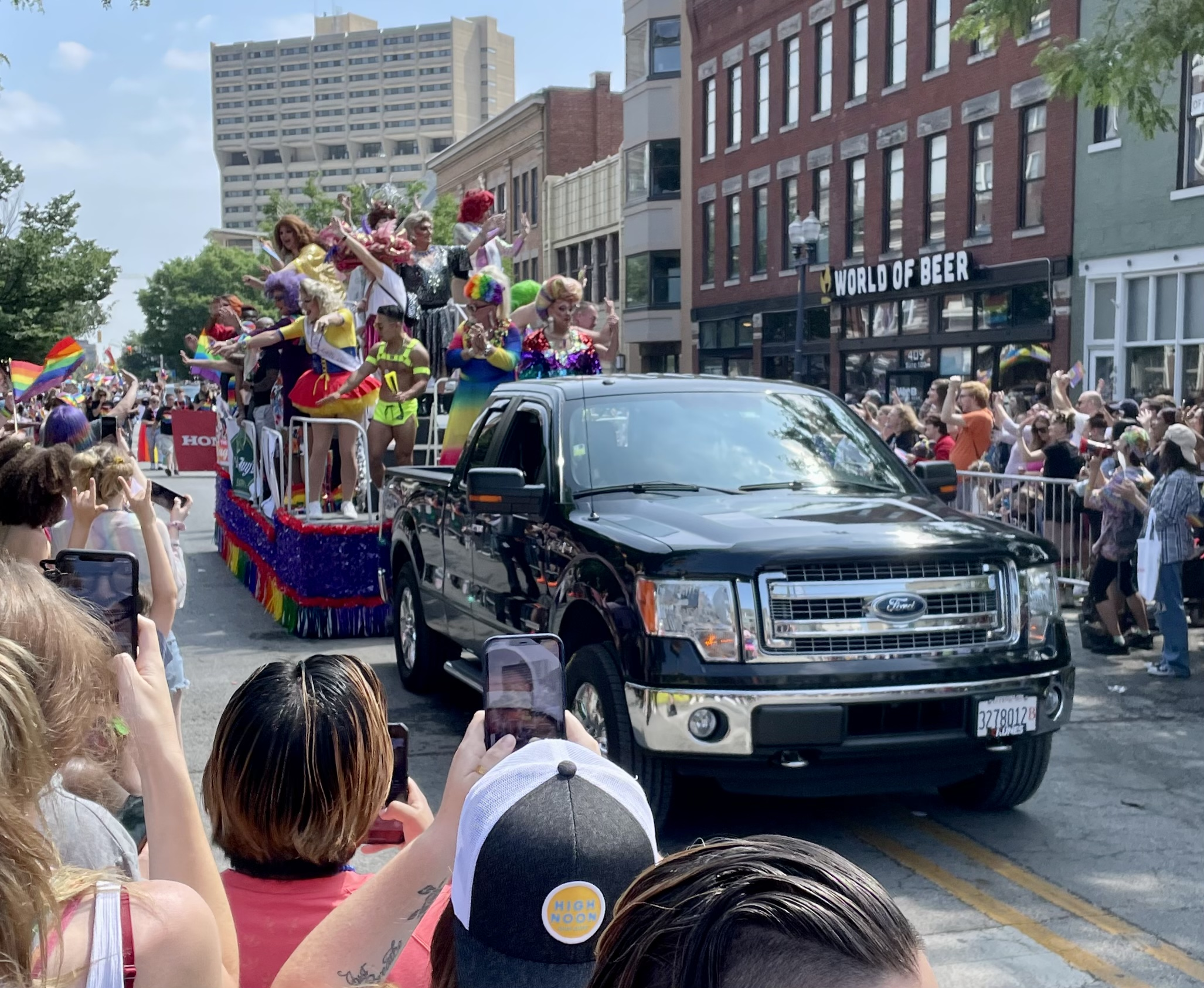
The Indy Bag Ladies float at Pride Parade 2022

The Indy Bag Ladies collaborated in the past with other organizations like Indiana Cares, AIDServe, and Indiana Still Cares. Since its founding, the Bag Ladies have fundraised over $1 million for the various charities they support. In 2017, The Health Foundation of Greater Indianapolis (HFGI) officially made the Bag Ladies part of the organization, to better align the group with HFGI, the organization to which most of their fundraising is donated.

== Current ==
Besides the bus tour, they host other annual events around Indianapolis, such as "Shimmering Shamrocks", "The Stockings Were Hung", Cadillac Barbie's Disco Brunch, and Loud & Proud, among others. The Ladies also make appearances at other events as well, in order to help raise money for local organizations. The Bag Ladies Bus Tour remains an annual event and at the end of each night, a new queen is crowned. The queen wins based on money raised and a pageant held prior to the bus tour.
