= Campus Pride =

American nonprofit organization

- Formation: 1 September 2001; 25 years ago
- Type: 501(c)(3)
- Legal status: nonprofit educational foundation
- Purpose: Support & Services for LGBT & Allied College/University Students and/or Campus Organizations
- Headquarters: Charlotte, North Carolina; United States of America
- Region served: USA
- Members: College/University Students
- Executive Director: TBD
- Website: https://web.archive.org/web/20260420100603/https://campuspride.org/

Campus Pride is an American national nonprofit 501(c)(3) organization founded by M. Chad Wilson, Sarah E. Holmes and Shane L. Windmeyer in 2001 which serves lesbian, gay, bisexual and transgender (LGBT) and ally student leaders and/or campus organization in the areas of leadership development, support programs and services to create safer, more inclusive LGBT-friendly colleges and universities.

== Purpose ==
Campus Pride is a national educational organization for LGBT and ally college students and campus groups building future leaders and safer, more LGBT-friendly colleges and universities

The organization describes itself as a volunteer-driven network for and by student leaders. Campus Pride envisions campuses and a society free of LGBT prejudice, bigotry and hate. It works to develop student leaders, campus networks and future actions to create such positive change.

== Programs ==
The work the organization is involved in includes but is not limited to:

=== LGBT-Friendly College Fair Program and Campus Climate Index ===
Campus Pride organizes college fairs, to allow prospective students to meet with college representatives. Additionally in response to the need for tools and resources to support campuses in assessing LGBT-Friendly policies, programs and practices, Campus Pride in conjunction with a team of national LGBT researchers including Brett Genny Beemyn, Ph.D., Susan R. Rankin, Ph.D. and Shane L. Windmeyer, M.S, Ed. developed the LGBT-Friendly Campus Climate Index. In 2012 Campus Pride issued its first "Top 25 LGBT-Friendly Colleges And Universities" list which ranked the most welcoming and inclusive places for LGBT students and allies go to college. In 2019, Campus Pride instituted an annual fee for colleges to participate in the index.

=== National LGBT Scholarship Database ===
Campus Pride, working in partnership with the Point Foundation, began the National LGBT Scholarship Database in February 2014. This initiative was taken to raise awareness of the opportunities offered by academic institutions to fund the education of LGBT students.

=== Voice & Action National Leadership Award ===
Campus Pride established the Voice & Action National Leadership Award, America's only national award for "the work of undergraduate college students who are creating positive change for lesbian, gay, bisexual, transgender (LGBT) and ally issues".

=== Campus Pride Summer Leadership Camp ===
Campus Pride organizes an annual Summer Leadership Camp for LGBT and Ally college students. The five-day camp experience works to develop stronger undergraduate student leaders and safer, more LGBT-friendly colleges and universities. Participants have the opportunity to learn valuable campus organizing skills, coalition building and strategies for creating change at colleges and universities.

=== Lambda 10 Project ===
The Lambda 10 Project is a National Clearinghouse for Gay, Lesbian, Bisexual, Transgender Fraternity & Sorority Issues works to heighten the visibility of gay, lesbian, bisexual and transgender members of the college fraternities/sororities by serving as a clearinghouse for educational resources and educational materials related to sexual orientation and gender identity/expression as it pertains to the fraternity/sorority experience.

== Events ==
Campus Pride partners with other LGBT-Friendly Organizations year-round to host events including, but not limited to:

=== Out and Greek Institute for LGBT & Ally Fraternity & Sorority Leaders ===
In 2013, Campus Pride, in a partnership with the Point Foundation, hosted its first annual "Out and Greek Institute". It became the first conference "for LGBT and ally fraternity and sorority leaders to share, network and learn strategies to create safer, more LGBT inclusive fraternity and sorority communities."

== See also ==
- Athlete Ally
- Gay-straight alliance (US)
- Lambda 10 Project (US)
- National Union of Students LGBT Campaign (UK)
- Queer Youth Network (UK)
