= Herdman Collegiate (High School) =

- Corner Brook, Newfoundland and Labrador; Canada

Information
- Established: Mid-1950s
- Colour: Red
- Team name: Huskies

Herdman Collegiate, usually known simply as "Herdman", was a high school in Corner Brook, Newfoundland, Canada.

== History ==
When the school opened in the mid-1950s, it was known as Amalgamated Regional High School. In 1966, it was known as Corner Brook Regional High, not to be confused with the modern school of the same name. It was in the mid-1960s when it became known as Herdman Collegiate. The school continued operations until June 2006 when it went into complete reconstruction as part of the city's new "Super School", Corner Brook Regional High School.

== Sports and clubs ==
Herdmans housed a vast number of sports, clubs and societies. Sports such as basketball, hockey, volleyball, wrestling, and softball were available for students. Clubs, like the newspaper, SADD, Allied Youth, Student council, drama club and Amnesty International were among some of the more popular ones which many students chose to take part in.
