= Triangle Program =

Canadian alternative education program for LGBT students

The Triangle Program is an alternative education program in Toronto, Ontario, Canada, designed for gay, lesbian, bisexual and transgender students who are at risk of dropping because of homophobic and transphobic harassment in regular schools or need supports and flexibility around struggles with mental health, housing, or other social struggles.

Operated by the Toronto District School Board at the campus of Oasis Alternative Secondary School, Triangle is the only program of its type in Canada. It was created as an organization in 1995, and launched its first classes in 1996.

In conjunction with the LGBT youth organization Supporting Our Youth, Triangle also holds its own annual prom during Toronto's Gay Pride Week.

The school day is divided into two halves. For the first half of the day students work on self-directed studies or smaller teacher-led classes. The afternoon is spent in a classroom setting, working on curriculum with a gay, lesbian and transgender focus. Units on LGBTQ history, healthy sexuality and equity and oppression allow gay, lesbian and transgender youth the opportunity to experience education geared to them.
