= Damien Center =

Non-profit HIV/AIDS service organization in Indianapolis, Indiana, U.S.

Coordinates: 39.7679°N 86.1337°W

- Formation: June 1987
- Headquarters: 26 N. Arsenal ave. Indianapolis, IN 46201
- President and CEO: Alan Witchey
- Website: damien.org

The Damien Center is the largest care center (providing both health and counseling services) for people with HIV/AIDS in Indianapolis, Indiana. It has been open since 1987 and is the longest-sustained project of the Indy Bag Ladies.

== Purpose and founding ==
The Damien Center was established in April 1987 by a team of community members including the Darrell Arthur of the Indy Bag Ladies, Monsignor Gettlefinger at Saints Peter and Paul Catholic Cathedral representing the Roman Catholic Archdiocese, and Earl Conner, an Episcopalian minister and AIDS activist representing the Episcopal Diocese of Indianapolis. The center is named after Father Damien, a Roman Catholic priest who dedicated his life to caring for individuals with leprosy in Hawaii in the late 1800s. In its early years, the center was almost exclusively staffed by volunteers and provided testing, offered a food pantry, coordinated care for people with HIV and AIDS, and other services for people with AIDS. When it opened in 1987, the Damien Center was located in the former Cathedral Grade School at 1350 N. Pennsylvania Street and housed four community groups, including the Buddy Support Program, Bag Ladies, Inc., People with AIDS Coalition Newsletter, and Marion County AIDS Taskforce. The Damien Center also offered patient and family support groups and a library of educational materials.

=== Buddy Support Program ===
The Buddy Support Program was founded by Darrell Arthur, and psychiatrist Dr. Daniel Hicks in Indianapolis. The program trained unlicensed caregivers to physically and emotionally assist people with AIDS. The program offered several days of training which included mental support for grief, the physical symptoms of AIDS, and more. Upon completion of the program, Buddies were then paired with a person with AIDS in the community who needed assistance. The Buddy Program was adopted by the Damien Center when it opened.

=== Safe needle exchange ===
In partnership with the Marion County Public Health Department, the Damien Center operates a van that provides clean needles, naloxone, and care and other harm-reduction measures to drug users.

== Expansion ==
The Damien Center has expanded significantly since 2017/2018. In 2017, Marion County was identified as one of 50 areas that account for more than half of new HIV diagnoses in the United States. With the push to end the HIV epidemic by the Department of Health and Human Services, the center has responded by expanding. The center has grown from 40 employees to more than 150, and with the campus expansion, will grow to over 200.

The Damien Center is currently located in a former school at 26 N. Arsenal Avenue, where it has been for 15 years. In 2021, the Damien Center announced a $30 million expansion that will triple the size of its headquarters. Groundbreaking for the construction began in March 2023 with plans for completion by late fall of 2024. The new headquarters will be located on the corner of E. Washington St. and Oriental Ave., near the current building. The center will expand into a building campus that will include an expanded Damien Cares clinic, the current building, and redevelopment of the building that formerly housed Zonie's Closet, an Indianapolis drag bar that closed in 2021. With the expansion, the Damien Center will be able to support expanded youth programming, therapy programs, housing, and prevention and harm reduction programs. The expanded Damien Cares Clinic will offer dental and vision clinics, multiple exam rooms, a lab, an expanded food pantry, a pharmacy, and an expanded HIV and sexually transmitted infections testing service. The former Zonie's Closet building will have a coffee shop on the first floor, and the revenue will be used to support the job resource center that will be on the top floor.
