= Gay–straight alliance =

Student groups supporting LGBTQ youth

Gender-Sexuality alliance
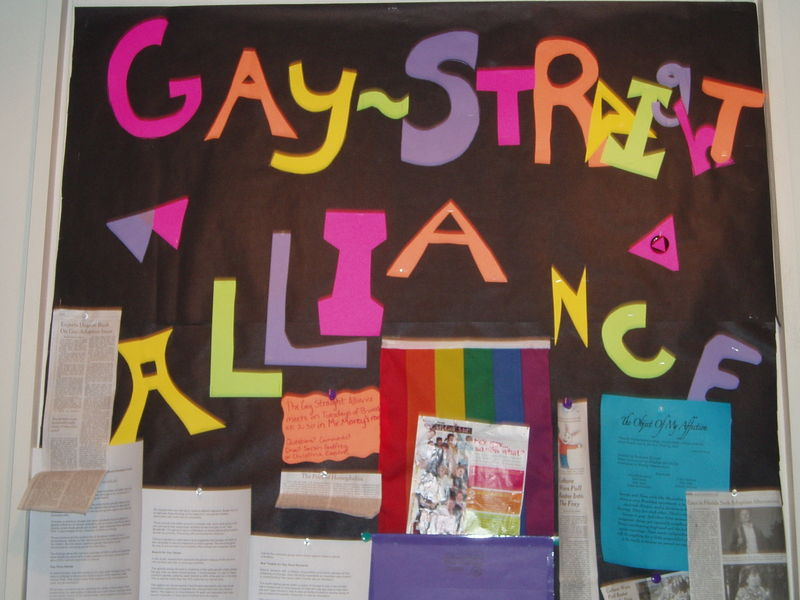
- Abbreviation: GSA
- Nickname: Gender-Sexuality
- Type: Student club
- Legal status: In the US, the right of students to form a GSA at public schools is protected by the Constitution and by the Equal Access Act.
- Purpose: Supporting LGBTQ students and straight allies
- Locations: United States; Canada; United Kingdom; New Zealand; Mexico; Europe; India; Hong Kong; Australia

A gay–straight alliance, gender–sexuality alliance or queer–straight alliance (GSA or QSA) is a student-led organization that seeks to create safe and inclusive environments for LGBTQ students and their allies. GSAs are most commonly found in secondary schools, colleges, and universities in the United States and Canada, although similar groups exist in other countries.

The first gay–straight alliance was established in 1988 at Concord Academy in Concord, Massachusetts, by students and teachers including Kevin Jennings and Meredith Sterling. The model subsequently spread to other schools and contributed to the development of organizations such as Glisten and the GSA Network.

GSAs commonly organize support networks, educational activities, and activism relating to LGBTQ issues and school environments. Research has associated GSAs with positive social, academic, and mental health outcomes for LGBTQ students, including lower levels of victimization and stronger feelings of school belonging.

In the United States, attempts to establish GSAs have sometimes led to legal disputes with school authorities. Federal courts have repeatedly ruled that students may form GSAs in public secondary schools where other non-curricular student organizations are permitted.

== History ==
=== Founding ===
The first gay–straight alliance was formed in November 1988 at Concord Academy in Concord, Massachusetts, when Kevin Jennings, a history teacher at the school who had recently come out as gay, was approached by a straight student who was upset by the treatment of gay students and others. Jennings recruited some other teachers at the school to form the group. One of the first to join was Sterling's classmate S. Bear Bergman. Jennings credits the school's students for the establishment of the club, as well as for setting the agenda of campaigning against homophobia, and for changes to the school's anti-discrimination policy. Jennings later co–founded the Gay, Lesbian & Straight Education Network (GLSEN, subsequently renamed Glisten) in 1990.

A few months later, another Massachusetts preparatory school, Phillips Academy, started the second gay–straight alliance. On February 7, 1989, a student called a meeting with little advance notice. A dozen people attended, including a mix of student, teachers, and staff. Among the group's supporters was Kathy Henderson, the school's athletic director, who later co–founded Glisten, along with Kevin Jennings of Concord Academy.

In 2018, Concord Academy reported that students at the group had renamed it to "Gender Sexuality Alliance". Faculty mentor Nancy Boutilier said, "That gay–straight language was really important at the time. Times change, though. To students today, that sounds so binary."

=== Other GSA History in the United States ===
Founded in 1984 in the Los Angeles Unified School District, Project 10 was widely recognized as the first organized effort to provide support for LGBTQ youth in schools across the United States and has been characterized as "perhaps the most important precursor of the GSA movement." The majority of its facilitators were heterosexual, and the program was named after the commonly quoted statistic that 10 per cent of the adult male population is "exclusively homosexual". Project 10 focused on issues such as substance use and high-risk sexual behaviour.

The first public school gay–straight alliance was started at Newton South High School (Newton, Massachusetts) by teacher Robert Parlin.

GSAs made headlines in 1999 as a result of legal developments in Utah–East High Gay/Straight Alliance v. Board of Education of Salt Lake City School District. The federal district court for Utah found that denying access to a school-based gay–straight alliance was a violation of the Federal Equal Access Act giving students the right to use facilities for extracurricular activities at any public secondary school that receives federal funding.

On January 24, 2012, the United States Secretary of Education, Arne Duncan, released a video on YouTube commemorating GSA Day and endorsing GSA clubs in schools.

==== Inclusivity ====
Approximately 28 per cent of GSA participants in a GSA Network survey identified as heterosexual.

==== Opposition ====
Some students face opposition from school administrations, elected school boards, or local communities in starting a school GSA.

In 2015, students at Brandon High School in Rankin County, Mississippi, attempted to start a GSA, but the school board met and publicly stated they wanted to prevent the formation of "gay clubs" in the school district. They then created a policy requiring parents to provide written permission before a student can join any club. Students then protested with support from the ACLU.

Students at West Carteret High School in Morehead City, North Carolina, tried to start a GSA but the Carteret County Board of Education turned it down.

==== Case law ====
In the United States, the right of students to establish a GSA at school is guaranteed by both the First Amendment to the United States Constitution (with regard to every level of schooling) and the federal Equal Access Act (with regard to middle and high schools where other non-curricular student clubs are allowed). Since 1998, there have been at least 17 federal court cases in which middle or high school students have prevailed on this issue, with federal courts consistently ruling that students have both a right to establish a GSA at school and to use the name Gay–Straight Alliance instead of an alternative name.

In 1999, the Orange Unified School District in Orange County, California, moved to prohibit the formation of a GSA at El Modena High School. Students then sued the school board, claiming that their rights under the First Amendment and the 1984 Equal Access Act had been violated. In the first-ever ruling of its kind, Judge David O. Carter of the United States District Court for the Central District of California issued a preliminary injunction ordering the school to allow the GSA to meet.

In 2009, the United States District Court for the Middle District of Florida ruled in favor of high school students whose attempt to form a GSA had been blocked by the school board, in the case of Gay–Straight Alliance of Yulee High School v. School Board of Nassau County, with the federal court also ruling that the school must allow the students to use the name Gay–Straight Alliance instead of an alternative name that excludes the term Gay.

In 2016, the United States Court of Appeals for the Eleventh Circuit unanimously ruled in favor of middle school students whose attempt to form a GSA had been blocked by the school board, in the case of Carver Middle School Gay–Straight Alliance v. School Board of Lake County, Florida.

In 2025, Texas adopted SB 12, a law purporting to ban GSAs in its public schools. The American Civil Liberties Union of Texas, Transgender Law Center (TLC), and the law firm of Baker McKenzie filed a lawsuit in August 2025, challenging the constitutionality of SB 12 on behalf of GSA Network, Students Engaged in Advancing Texas (SEAT), the Texas American Federation of Teachers, a teacher, and two students. In February 2026, a federal court granted a preliminary injunction blocking enforcement of portions of the law in three specific school districts.

=== Outside the United States ===
Worldwide, gay–straight alliances are not as common as the organizations are in the United States, but are beginning to spread, particularly in Canada.

==== Australia ====
As of July 2020, as reported by the media Star Observer, Australia has one gay–straight alliance set up within the Melbourne Grammar School. However, the United Kingdom, New Zealand, Canada and some parts of the United States have had gay–straight alliances within schools for decades.

In Australia, the group Safe Schools Coalition Victoria piloted a system of reducing homophobia though teacher training and student groups that promote inclusion of LGBTQ young people, which ran from 2014 to 2017. Started by The Foundation for Young Australians and Gay and Lesbian Health Victoria, along with La Trobe University, the program was expanded to run Australia-wide. The program was supported by Beyondblue, Headspace, the University of Canberra, Macquarie University, University of Western Sydney, Curtin University, various family planning and HIV prevention groups, government bodies and Uniting Church organizations.

==== Bulgaria ====
In 2016, Bulgaria became the first country in the Balkans to open a gay–straight alliance in Sofia American College.

==== Canada ====
As Canada has two official languages, LGBTQ student clubs may be referred to as gay–straight alliances (GSA), queer-straight alliances (QSA), alliance allosexuelle-hétérosexuelle (AAH), or alliance gaie-hétéro (AGH).

In May 2010 Egale Canada launched MyGSA.ca, a website focused on GSAs and their role in making Canadian schools safer and more LGBTQ inclusive. Their website includes educational resources for GSAs and information about available bursaries and funding. While MyGSA previously included a directory of registered Canadian GSA, this feature is no longer available on their website. Prior to closing the public directory, more than 283 GSAs had registered with the website.

Currently there are no federal laws in Canada regarding GSAs. Any laws are specific to each province or territory.

The first GSA in Canada was started in 1998 at Pinetree Secondary School in Coquitlam, British Columbia. The start of the Pinetree GSA garnered national media attention, and its members continued to play a role in public affairs by meeting with successive provincial Ministers of Education, testifying before the B.C. Safe Schools Task Force on anti-bullying, and delivering workshops to students and educators about LGBT-sensitive inclusive language and how to start GSAs. In early 2002, the Pinetree GSA held the first Pride Day at a high school in Canada. The Pride Day included an information fair with booths from various local LGBTQ organizations, PrideTalk workshops delivered in numerous classes, and an assembly with a talk on transgender rights and a performance by G.L.A.S.S., a local LGBTQ youth choir.

As of 2011, 41% of schools in British Columbia were reported to have a GSA.

The first GSA in Alberta was started in 2000 at the Lindsay Thurber Comprehensive High School in Red Deer. While members initially feared backlash, there was little-to-no negative reaction to the club.

In 2011, the Edmonton public school board introduced a policy which mandates that all school principals must establish a GSA if asked for one by students. The same year, the school board assigned a district consultant to provide support for GSAs within the city and host a monthly meeting for GSA members to network.

In 2017, the NDP government of Alberta introduced Bill 24, the Act to Support Gay–Straight Alliances, which mandated that all schools within the province allow student to create a GSA, allow them to explicitly name it a gay–straight alliance or queer-straight alliance, and prohibits school officials from notifying parents if their child joined a GSA. Schools that do not comply with the bill's requirement are subject to lose government funding. Following the release of the bill, there was disapproval from some politicians and parents. In April 2018, the Justice Centre for Constitutional Freedoms (JCCF) filed a Court of Queen's Bench challenge application claiming that prohibiting school officials from notifying parents when their child joins a GSA violates their constitutional rights.

The New Democratic Party of Alberta filibustered for changes to the Bill 8 (The Education Amendment Act) since the United Conservative Party (UCP) defeated all amendments that would protect LGBTQ teachers and staff over their sexual orientation and gender identity. The UCP have removed protections that were in the 2017 Bill 24, Bill 8 allows for students to be outed by school teachers, administration or staff if a student asks for there to be a GSA or QSA. Albertan schools are no longer compelled to act in an urgent manner in the student's request for a GSA or QSA, allowing the school to take as much time as desired without facing penalties that were in Bill 24.

In Saskatchewan, Carlton Comprehensive High School houses one of the first GSA movements in the city of Prince Albert. The first GSA in the city of Saskatoon first met on March 18, 2003, at Mount Royal Collegiate. Since then, GSAs have been established at Nutana, Walter Murray, Evan Hardy, Marion Graham, Bedford Road and Aden Bowman Collegiates. The city of North Battleford Saskatchewan, had their first GSA in 2004 at Sakewew High School, a First Nations school. Saskatchewan's first GSA summit took place on April 15, 2016, in Saskatoon.

In 2013, the Manitoba government introduced Bill 18, The Public Schools Amendment Act (Safe and Inclusive Schools). This act required school board to accommodate all student requests to form GSAs.

The first elementary school GSA in Ontario was started in 2008 at the Sunnyside Public School in Kitchener.

In Ontario, Arnprior District High school, a small rural Ottawa Valley town started a GSA created by the students in 2009. This GSA won one of three Jer's Vision "Youth Role Model of The Year" awards in April 2009. The next year a GSA was founded by students in 2010 at Renfrew Collegiate Institute in the town of Renfrew.

In December 2011, the government of the most populous Canadian province, Ontario, announced it would bring a legislation making it mandatory for all publicly funded schools to support the formation of "tolerance clubs" and student associations. Gay–straight clubs were to be specifically mentioned in that act. The main focus of that Bill 14 would be to counterattack bullying of students, particularly those of a racial or sexual minority.

Beyond a school group the Toronto District School Board has been committed to an unwritten alliance with their students. In addition to co-hosting the OUTShine GSA National Summit in 2013, they funded the Triangle Program at OASIS Alternative School, designed for gay, lesbian, bisexual and transgender students who are at risk of dropping out or committing self-harm because of harassment in regular schools.

As of 2011, 37% of schools in Ontario were reported to have a GSA.

In 2008, the non-profit organization Pride in Education was founded to protect the safety and wellbeing of LGBTQ students in New Brunswick. In 2010, they held the first annual Pride in Education GSA Conference for students and teachers interested in creating GSAs.

The first GSA in New Brunswick was founded in 2013 at Woodstock High School following the suggestion of Svend Robinson.

The University of Prince Edward Island's Social Justice Studies program founded shOUT!, an annual conference aimed as GSAs but open to the public, in 2013.

In 1998, The Youth Project, a non-profit focused on LGBTQ youth in Nova Scotia, received funding from Health Canada to increase education about LGBTQ in schools. Through this initiative, the organization was able to found the first GSA in Nova Scotia at Millwood High School. The Youth Project currently hosts a list of all GSAs in the province on their website.

The first GSA conference in Newfoundland and Labrador was held at Corner Brook Regional High in 2013.

While the Yukon Department of Education does not have specific legislation regarding GSA, it does have a policy which mandates safety and inclusion for LGBTQ students which has been used in the justification for GSAs. Additionally, the territory mandates that all schools must appoint a staff member as a "safe contact" to provide support for LGBTQ students.

In 2013, a group of students requested to start a GSA at Vanier Catholic Secondary in Whitehorse. The school initially denied this request as it conflicted with the school's Catholic, anti-gay policies. Students of the school protested the denial by wearing pink shirts and holding a sit-in at the Yukon legislative building and wearing rainbow socks to their graduation ceremony. Following the protests, the Yukon Department of Education overturned the school's policy regarding GSAs as it did not meet the mandates outlines in the department's Sexual Orientation and Gender Identity Policy

The only GSA in Nunavut is at Inuksuk High School in Iqaluit.

==== Hong Kong ====
In 2008, students at The University of Hong Kong founded Queer Straight Alliance (QSA), a registered society under Hong Kong laws. For several years it was the only GSA in the city, and it serves students in all campuses through social activities, career support and advocacy. In more recent years, university students in the city have formed other student LGBTQ groups. However, GSA efforts in secondary schools remain limited, if any.

==== India ====
The first GSA in India was started in Tagore International School in New Delhi in 2014 by a group of students and their mentor Shivanee Sen who had formed a pro-LGBTQ initiative known as 'Breaking Barriers' which was the first student-led campaign in India to address LGBTQI (lesbian, gay, bisexual, transgender, queer, intersex) issues. This group was first inspired to care and focus on the lives of oppressed students and hijras, a community of transgender women, intersex individuals, and eunuchs in India who are marginalized both socially and economically.

At Presidency University, Kolkata, around 100 students have formed a GSA group called Ardhek Akash, which also produces a magazine of the same name. In recent months the group has formed new chapters at Jadavpur University and St. Xavier's College—also in Calcutta—and is looking to expand further.

==== Mexico ====
The first GSA in Mexico was begun by a group of students in 2004 at the American School Foundation, a private American school in Mexico City. The GSA was initially opposed by several school board members and a small group of religious conservative parents. But the students eventually won and formed the student club. The GSA's co-advisor, Ian K. Macgillivray, wrote several articles detailing his students' experiences, as well as the book, Gay–Straight Alliances: A Handbook for Students, Educators, and Parents (2007, Harrington Park Press).

==== Netherlands ====
The first GSAs in the Netherlands were started in 2009. At the beginning of 2011, a nationwide campaign was started on television to promote GSAs in Dutch schools, featuring several well-known young actors and singers. A number of GSAs already exist in a wide variety of Dutch schools throughout the country, most of them at the university level, but increasingly popular on secondary school level.

==== New Zealand ====
Nelson College, the Nelson College for Girls, Nayland College and other schools have had GSAs set up, often with the support of youth mental health bodies. Kira Byrne, a GSA leader at Nelson College for Girls, says that the legalization of same-sex marriage in New Zealand in 2013 created shifts in attitudes towards LGBTQ people in New Zealand, but that boys at Nelson College were afraid to go to the GSA there because "other boys would wait outside to beat up anyone that came out."

==== Portugal ====
ILGA Portugal, inspired by the gay–straight alliance model, introduced the Aliança da Diversidade (Diversity Alliance) project in the northern region of the country. The initiative, similar to GSA, aimed to establish secondary level student groups, including teachers, to enhance the safety and inclusivity of Portuguese schools. The focus was on fostering an environment that embraced diversity, particularly regarding sexual orientation, gender identity and expression, and sex characteristics (SOGIESC).

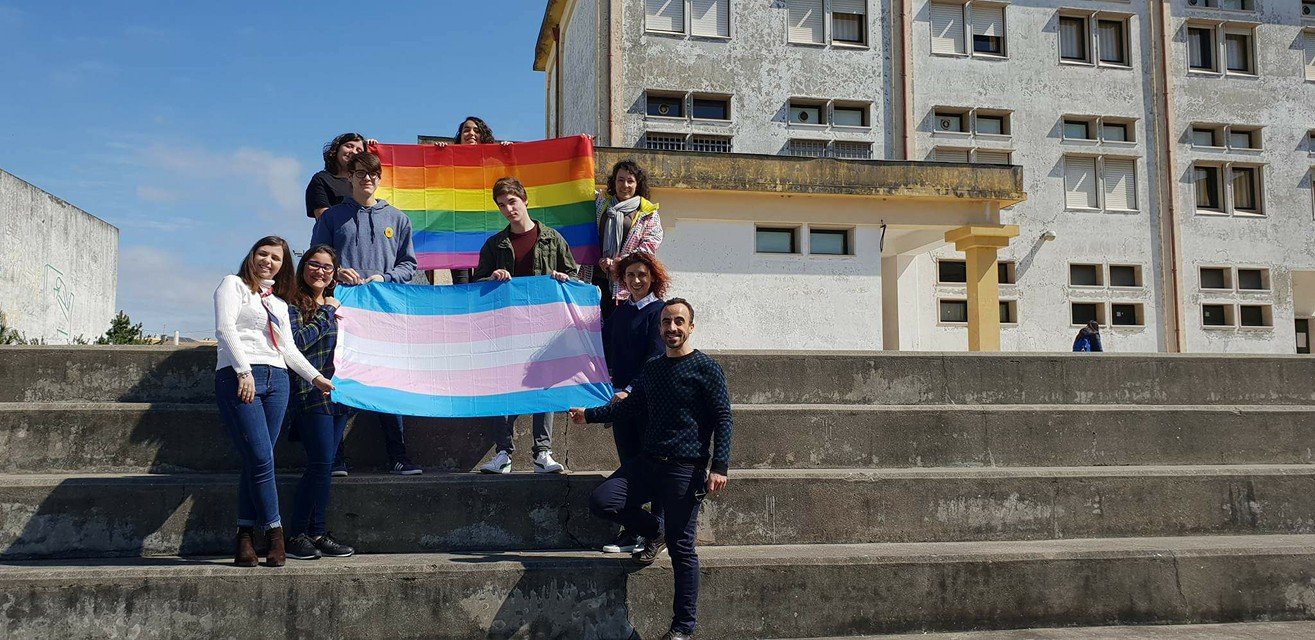
Group of Portuguese students with the rainbow flag and the transgender flag at Escola Secundária Júlio Dinis in Ovar, Portugal

The primary objectives included integrating LGBTI students, eradicating the various forms of discrimination experienced related to SOGIESC within the school context. The overarching goals were aligned with promoting citizenship, human rights, and gender equality. The project received co-financing from the Programa Operacional de Inclusão Social e Emprego, Portugal 2020, and the European Social Fund.

As a complementary effort to ADD, a national school environment Study was initiated. This study aimed to gather insights into the experiences of LGBTI or questioning youth. Telmo Fernandes, the ADD project coordinator, highlighted that the collected responses underscored the persistent issues of isolation and discrimination, emphasizing the need for the intended change.

Alianças da Diversidade groups were established in various schools across the country, including locations such as Ovar municipality, Ramada parish and in the city of Ermesinde. The project officially ran from mid-2017 to February 2019, but the groups created during this period could continue independently, promoting the same objectives.

In addition to the ADD project, GSA-like groups have also been formed in universities, including those in Lisbon and Braga.

==== United Kingdom ====
In the UK, there has always been more of an emphasis on stand alone lesbian and gay youth groups that take place outside of the school setting, often funded by the local health authority or education service. The first GSA in the UK was founded in 2000 by CN Lester at Putney High School GDST, and led in part to the formation of Queer Youth Network. The second GSA in the UK was started in 2010 at Shimna Integrated College in Northern Ireland. Another GSA started in 2012 by Copland Community school in Wembley. The setting up of the club has subsequently resulted in the school being known for "tackling homophobic prejudice". Acland Burghley school in Camden set up a gay–straight alliance in 2012 called Connected.

== Goal ==
The goal of most gay–straight alliances is to make their school community safe, facilitate activism on campus, and create a welcoming environment for LGBTQ students. They are part of the LGBT student movement and participate in national campaigns to raise awareness, such as the Day of Silence, National Coming Out Day, No Name Calling Week, Transgender Day of Remembrance, Harvey Milk Day, GSA day or locally organized campaigns, such as Take It Back: Anti-Slur Campaign, Beyond the Binary, LGBTQ-Inclusive Curriculum and others. Many GSAs work with local chapters of the Gay, Lesbian and Straight Education Network (GLSEN) or Gay–Straight Alliance Network, a national organization supporting youth leadership. The registered number of GSAs with GLSEN is over 4,000, as of 2008. In California, there are over 900 GSAs registered with GSA Network, representing over half of California's high schools. Over half the states in the United States have one or more statewide groups that work with GSAs. Many of these state based groups and local chapters of GLSEN participate in the National Association of GSA Networks. GSA Networks have been formed to help local area students to network and connect to local resources, provide training for youth leaders, and sponsor local GSA efforts.

The inclusion of cisgender heterosexual allies in the missions of these groups "is an important distinguishing factor from early support groups for LGBTQ teens, and recognizes the need for a comprehensive approach to youth safety", and attempts to build a network of support for non-heterosexual and transgender teens, as well as raise awareness of homophobia and heterosexism.

== Impact ==
=== Outcomes ===
==== Social ====
LGBTQ students routinely experience harassment in their schools. However, GSAs and other support clubs have been found to provide social support for LGBTQ students. Students have reported hearing homophobic remarks from both students and instructors in their schools. In addition, the more harassment students reported, the more likely the student also reported higher levels of depression and lower self-esteem. However, LGBTQ students attending a school with an active support club reported hearing less homophobic expressions and experienced less victimization than LGBTQ students attending a school without a GSA or support club. In addition, LGBTQ students with a GSA in their high school reported more positive outcomes when it came to high school belonging and school victimization.

In addition to the mere presence of a GSA on campus, level of participation in a GSA has also been linked to the amount of social support reported by LGBTQ students. A 2011 study by Toomey, Ryan, Diaz and Russell (2011) found that the presence of a GSA, participation in a GSA, and perceived effectiveness of a GSA were each individually associated with youth's well-being. In certain cases, research showed these three factors protected youth's well-being against victimization. Furthermore, youths who participated in a GSA reported lower levels of depression and higher self-esteem.

GSAs are important not only at the individual level, but also to promote the education of LGBTQ issues to school populations. GSA's have been found to promote social activism. Researchers have argued that GSAs are a grassroots student initiated form of activism. The same researchers claimed that GSAs are important to challenge the status quo, confront discrimination, and reconceptualize gender.

==== Academic ====
LGBTQ youths in schools across the US are subject to serious obstacles that may impact their ability to perform in school. A 2011 study found that two thirds of LGBTQ students reported feeling unsafe at school. Some students felt so unsafe that they reported missing school due to safety concerns. The same study found that the GPA of LGBTQ children was, on average, half a grade lower than straight. This may be an indicator that LGBTQ youth face different barriers to education than straight youth.

LGBTQ youth's school experience may impact their life decisions. LGBTQ youth in high school were less likely to report that they wanted to pursue further education than straight youth. These findings suggest that LGBTQ youths' negative experiences in primary education relate to their decision not to continue on in the education system. This then robs LGBTQ youth of all of the opportunities that advanced education offers.

However, an active GSA on a high school campus has been associated with better academic outcomes for LGBTQ students. LGBTQ youth attending schools with an active GSA were less likely to report feeling unsafe at school and were less likely to miss school due to a threat to their safety. Additionally, LGBTQ youths who had an active GSA at their high school reported higher educational attainment than LGBTQ youth who did not have a GSA on their high school campus.

==== Health ====
GSAs/QSAs are associated with better mental health outcomes, such as less depression, less general psychological distress, and higher self-esteem than students without a GSA at their high school. The positive impacts of GSAs/QSAs in students' lives include: increase in school attendance and attachment to the school, sense of empowerment and hope, new friendships, reduction in stress and isolation, increase in confidence and sense of pride. Students in schools that had an active GSA also reported less truancy). LGBTQ students with a support club in their school also reported lower levels of victimization and suicide attempts in comparison to schools without a support group).

GSAs have also been associated with other reduced health risk factors. LGBTQ students with a GSA in their high school reported more positive outcomes when it came to alcohol use and problems related to alcohol use. LGBTQ students with support groups in their schools reported half as much dating violence and less casual sex. Students with an active GSA in their high school were also less likely to be threatened or injured at school in comparison to students without an active GSA.

=== On students ===
GSAs are associated with benefits for LGBTQ students while they are attending school and beyond. The next important step is to understand why GSAs are associated with these benefits. One qualitative study found that the most beneficial aspect of a GSA was that it provides direct support to LGBTQ members and helps create a support network for LGBTQ students by connecting them. Another qualitative study found that GSAs were beneficial to LGBTQ students because they act as a protective factor for LGBTQ students' educational and social experience in school. The study further explained that GSAs provided LGBTQ students with a sense of identity within their school, improved their self-esteem, and even provided students with courage and support to come out to their families and peers.

One study investigated some of the possible factors within GSAs to discover which specific components of GSAs were associated with which beneficial outcomes. This study found that when GSA advisors served for longer periods of time, students had better health outcomes. In addition, LGBTQ students who perceived they had more control over their GSA experience and LGBTQ students who perceived their school to be more supportive had healthier outcomes. In addition, this study reported that "students level of GSA advocacy also predicted students' sense of life purpose."

=== After secondary school ===
The relationship between having a GSA in a high school and attitudes towards LGBTQ individuals does not end after high school. The mere presence of a GSA, whether or not students participated in said GSA, is related to students' attitudes toward LGBTQ people beyond their time in their high school. University students who reported having a GSA in their high school were more likely to report positive attitudes towards LGBTQ individuals while attending their university. This was true for all students except students who were raised in the southern U.S. where having a GSA in one's high school actually correlated with less positive attitudes toward LGBTQ individuals.

=== Summary ===
GSAs are associated with positive social academic and health outcomes for LGBTQ students. The relationship between having a GSA in one's high school and certain positive social outcomes is known to last beyond high school, however little beyond that is known about the long lasting associations with high school GSAs. Further research should be conducted on the lasting effects if GSAs for LGBTQ individuals. Researchers have also claimed that GSAs are important not only to LGBTQ students, but also to change the school climate as a whole to be more informed and respectful of LGBTQ issues. It has also been claimed that GSAs are important to get students involved in social activism. Researchers should investigate the relationship between having a GSA in a high school the school's social climate. Due to the positive associations between GSAs and student outcomes, school faculty including school psychologists and counselors should become social justice advocates for LGBTQ students by supporting GSAs on their campuses.

=== Accomplishments ===
The various accomplishments since the founding of the GSAs include:

- GSAs have played a great leadership role in the grassroots by organizing the passage of many ground-breaking, statewide legislations, like the AB 537: The California Student Safety and Violence Prevention Act of 2000 which prohibits discrimination on the basis of sexual orientation and gender identity.
- It has achieved a critical victory as the plaintiff in the first lawsuit filed under AB 537; which was a three-year settlement agreement which required the Visalia schools to enact sweeping reforms including mandatory teacher and student trainings that would be supportive to LGBTQ students.
- It also helped to pass 11 key laws to protect LGBTQ youth and create safer school environment.
- They also launched the National Association of GSA Networks in 2005 to unite statewide organizations to support GSAs and to accelerate the growth and impact of the GSA movement nationwide. To date, there are 40 states which have joined the National Association in the United States of America alone.

== GSA Network ==
The GSA Network is an LGBTQ rights organization founded in 1998 by Carolyn Laub to empower youth activists to start GSA clubs in their respective schools, to motivate and inspire fellow students to fight against homophobia and transphobia. Laub initially started working with this movement in 40 GSA clubs in the San Francisco Bay area from 1988–1999 and then gradually expanded to other cities and states. By 2001, The GSA Network had multiple branches at schools across the state. In the year 2005, it began operating programs nationally. It continues to network organizations representing over 4000 GSA clubs across the nation. The GSA Network organization is based in Oakland and has regional offices in Los Angeles, Fresno, Chicago, and Atlanta, and it continues to network organizations representing over 4,000 GSA clubs nationwide.

== See also ==
- Campus Pride (US)
- NOH8 Campaign
- Queer Youth Network (UK)
- LGBT conferences (UK)
- Homosocialization
- Gay, Lesbian, Bisexual, Transgender and Straight Alliance (GLBTSA)
