= Pride of Indy Band and Color Guard =

- instrumental and pageantry ensemble
- Founded: 2005
- Location: Indianapolis, Indiana
- Website: https://www.prideofindy.org/

The Pride of Indy Bands is a performing musical ensemble in Indianapolis of gay, lesbian, bisexual, transgender, and other LGBT-friendly musicians. Founded in March 2005, The Pride of Indy Band and Color Guard is currently the only LGBT instrumental and pageantry ensemble in Indiana, and is a member of the Lesbian and Gay Band Association. The organization conducts its activities in a supportive, accepting and affirming atmosphere, and includes experienced and amateur musicians. The band also assists adult members who do not have access to instruments by helping them rent or borrow instruments through local organizations.

== History ==
Since the band's beginnings in 2005, the band has grown to include a performing membership of 50 musicians, and has at one time included a marching band, pep band, a concert band, a brass ensemble, a woodwind ensemble, a saxophone collective, a visual ensemble, and a Jazz Band. Founding members include, among others, Travis Tester, Laura Blake, Shelly Snider, and Stephen McCoy. The group has a yearly performance calendar filled with over 20 concerts and special appearances at community events locally and in cities outside of Indiana.

The band performs annually at the Indy Pride Festival and Parade.

== Pride of Indy Bands (PI) notable milestones ==
- March 24, 2005 – First IN Pride 2005 Parade Committee meeting. LGBA shows interest in bringing a massed band to Indy for the Pride Parade.
- March 31, 2005 – LGBA Indy host coordinators (Stephen McCoy, Shelly Snider, and Bree Snyder) meet and decide on rehearsal dates and location of the first band rehearsal for Indy area musicians.
- May 12, 2005 – First rehearsal for the area musicians. The "Pride of Indy Band and Color Guard" (PI) is adopted as the name of the organization.
- June 10, 2005 – The massed band rehearses, includes musicians from LGBA bands in other parts of the United States.
- June 11, 2005 – The LGBA massed band marches in the IN Pride Parade and performs at the IN Pride 2005 Festival.
- June 21, 2005 – PI holds first regular rehearsal. At that rehearsal, Jeffrey Reeves suggests that the words "Gay and Lesbian" be included in the title of the group. He is met with hostility. Stephen McCoy calmed the discussion.
- November 5, 2005 – PI accepted as a "Band in Formation" with the Lesbian and Gay Band Association (LGBA).
- November 22, 2005 – The Pride of Indy Woodwind Ensemble has their first performance at the Indy Pride, Inc. Thanksgiving Dinner.
- November 28, 2005 – PI governance established.
- December 20, 2005 – PI conducts its first Holiday Concert at Broadway United Methodist Church.
- January 10, 2006 – PI receives an invitation to perform at "Spotlight," an annual featuring a cross section of the Indy arts scene, produced as an HIV/AIDS fundraising event benefiting the Indiana AIDS Fund. PI announces it will performance with vocalist Brenda Williams (local artist) for the 3,500+ people that will attend the event.
- February 13, 2006 – PI announces its 2006 Performance Schedule, including six concerts and several performances at special events in the area.
- February 19, 2006 – PI Board of Directors conducts first strategic planning meeting.
- March 12, 2006 – PI presents its first Spring Concert.
- June 6, 2006 – PI holds its first Anniversary Concert at Garfield Park in Indianapolis as a part of Pride Week.
- July 16, 2006 – PI is accepted as a full member band of LGBA at the annual Assembly of Delegates Meeting in Chicago.
- December, 2006 – PI's audience at annual Holiday Concert reaches 200. PI announces new director, Eric Knechtges. Jazz Ensemble makes their impressive debut. 2007 Performance Schedule is released.
- January, 2007 – PI accepts invitation to perform in Indy Parks concert series, two performances in June and July 2007.
- June, 2007 – PI holds its second Anniversary Concert on the lawn at the Old Firehouse Museum on Mass Avenue.
- July, 2007 – PI's concert band participates in the Garfield Park Conservatory and Sunken Gardens Summer Concert Series.
- August, 2007 – PI's jazz ensemble also participates in the Garfield Park series.
- November 29, 2007 – PI's jazz ensemble held its first annual fundraiser "Time Warp" at Talbott Street nightclub. The event featured jazz and big band music from the 1930s to contemporary artists.
- October, 2008 – Nathan Voges is selected to succeed Eric Knechtges as musical director.
- November 20, 2008 – PI's jazz ensemble held its second annual fundraiser "Time Warp 1940" at Talbott Street nightclub. The event featured the big band sounds of 1940 with guest vocalist Brenda Williams.
- March 24–28, 2010 – PI hosts the National Conference of the Lesbian and Gay Band Association (LGBA) at the Athaneum Theatre in Indianapolis.
- June 8, 2010 – PI Concert and Jazz Bands perform for 5th annual Anniversary Concert.
- June 12, 2010 – PI Marching Band and Visual Ensemble perform at 2010 Circle City Pride Parade.
- July 15, 2010 – PI Concert and Jazz Bands perform at Garfield Park Conservatory and Sunken Gardens Summer Concert Series.
- December 11, 2010 – PI Concert and Jazz Bands perform Holiday Concert at Broadway United Methodist Church, Indianapolis.
- March 20, 2011 – PI Concert Band performs at Arsenal Technical High School, Indianapolis.
- June 7, 2011 – PI Concert and Jazz Bands perform for 6th annual Anniversary Concert.
- June 11, 2011 – PI Marching Band and Visual Ensemble perform at 2011 Circle City Pride Parade.
- July 28, 2011 – PI Concert and Jazz Bands perform at Garfield Park Conservatory and Sunken Gardens Summer Concert Series.
- September, 2011 – PI Bands is officially recognized as a 501(c)3 Not-for-Profit organization.
- October 8, 2011 – PI Jazz Band, Pep Band and Visual Ensemble perform at Indiana AIDS Walk, Indianapolis.
- October 23, 2011 – PI Concert Band plays a combined concert with members of the Zionsville, IN Community Band at the Hebrew Center of Indianapolis.
- 2015 – PI hosts the Annual Conference of the Pride Bands Alliance.
- June 4, 2015 - PI celebrated its tenth anniversary with a concert on the Circle in Indianapolis.

== Pride of Indy ensembles ==
- Pride of Indy Concert Band
- Pride of Indy Marching/Pep Band
- Pride of Indy Jazz Band
- Geeks & Grooves Saxophone Collective

== Pride of Indy conductors (in chronological order) ==
=== Pride of Indy Concert Band ===
- Stephen McCoy
- Jeremy Kaylor
- Eric Knechtges
- Nathan Voges
- Chris Forsythe

=== Pride of Indy Jazz Ensemble ===
- John Joanette
- Wil Myers
- John Porter
- David Grider

=== Pride of Indy Marching Band ===
- Laura Blake

=== Geeks & Grooves Saxophone Collective ===
- J. Sage Weldy
- Brian Gibson
