= Eric Knechtges =

American composer (born 1978)

Eric Thomas Knechtges, DM (born April 16, 1978 in Lansing, MI) is an American composer. He has written works for a wide variety of performing mediums including: concert band, orchestra, a cappella choir, and chamber ensembles (including some works using computer music technology).

== Biography ==
Eric Knechtges has studied at the Indiana University (Bloomington) Jacobs School of Music (DM), Bowling Green State University (MM) and Michigan State University (BMusEd); he has also taught music (band, chorus, and music appreciation) at Addison Community Schools in Michigan. He has been an active conductor of bands and orchestras, including the Pride of Indy Band and Color Guard.

His composition, Broken Silents, was recognized for Special Distinction in the second annual American Society of Composers, Authors and Publishers ASCAP/CBDNA Frederick Fennell Competition. He has also been recognized in the National Bandmasters Association Young Composers Mentor Project, the National Association of Composers, USA Young Composers Competition, and the San Francisco Choral Artists New Voices Composition Competition, and the “Juan Bautista Comes” Choral Competition. His works have been performed by ensembles and artists throughout the United States, including the Michigan State University Symphony Band, the Bowling Green State University A Cappella Chorus, the Indiana University Symphonic Band, tubists Timothy Olt and Philip Sinder, cellist Suren Bagratuni, the San Francisco Choral Artists, the Governor's School of North Carolina, and the Purdue University Wind Ensemble.

Knechtges is also one of eighteen featured composers in the fourth edition of Composers on Composing for Band series written by Mark Camphouse.

== Works ==
- Aporia (2012), for euphonium and concert band
- Capriccio (2011), for tuba and piano
- Dali Hexaptych (2010), for brass choir
- Out Of C, for mixed ensemble (2008)
- Reflections on the River (2008), for tuba, cello, and piano
- Tie-Line March (2008), for concert band
- Things Left Unsaid (2008), for orchestra
- Amherst Posy (2007), for soprano, flute/alto flute/piccolo, and guitar
- Between (2007), for multiple percussion duet
- Mi Mariposa (2007), for concert band (based on melodies by Bloomington, IN elementary school children)
- To Build a Rainbow (2006, rev. 2007), for concert band
- O Nata Lux (2006), for mixed chorus
- Blaze (2006), for brass ensemble
- Synthetic Diversions (2006), for two-channel tape
- Winter Night (2006), for mixed chorus in just intonation
- Narrow Road to the Deep North (2006), for voice and Max/MSP
- Three Degrees of Separation (2005), for flute, clarinet, viola, cello, and marimba
- The Mystic Trumpeter (2005), for flügelhorn, baritone, and piano
- Exotherm (2005), for wind quintet (featured at Midwest Composer's Symposium 2007)
- Bogoroditse Djevo (2005), for soprano, euphonium, and piano
- Sic Enim Dilexit Deus Mundum (2005), for mixed chorus
- Sonos (2005), for mixed chorus
- The Sunset (2004), for mixed chorus
- Autumn Twilight (2004), for mixed chorus in just intonation
- A Moment's Peace (2004), for orchestra
- Caritas (2004), for mixed chorus
- Time for a Dream (2004), for two-channel tape
- Flag Salute (2004), for chamber ensemble
- Come and Be My Baby (2004), for soprano, alto saxophone, and piano
- Der Jagd (2003), for horn and piano
- Carpe Diem (2003), for concert band
- Jackson Fanfare (2003), for concert band
- October Prayer (2003), for mixed chorus
- A Metamusical Sonata (2002), for bassoon and piano
- Fleurs d'Eté (2002), for string quintet
- Broken Silents (2000), for concert band
- Song for a Rainy Day (200), for alto saxophone and piano
- The Kinsey Scale (2000), for baritone saxophone and harpsichord
- Oboists Three (2000), for oboe trio
- Dry Tears of November (1999), for trombone choir
- Michigan Moods (1996), for orchestra
- Midnight Caffeine (1996, rev. 2006), for tuba-euphonium quartet
- In Limine (1996), for concert band
- ¿Qué Pasa? (1995, rev. 2004), for tuba and piano
