= Corner Brook Regional High =

Corner Brook Regional High School

Location
- 12 University Drive; Corner Brook, Newfoundland and Labrador, A2H 5G4; Canada; 48.9413°N 57.9394°W

Information
- School type: Public High School
- Motto: TRUE (Tolerance, Respect, Unity, Excellence)
- Founded: March 3, 2009
- School board: NLSchools
- School number: 485
- Principal: Trevor Finlay
- Grades: Level 1-4
- Enrollment: 779 (2025-2026)
- Language: English, French
- Area: Western Newfoundland
- Colours: Black and Gold
- Mascot: titan
- Team name: Titans
- Website: cbrh.nlesd.ca/home

Corner Brook Regional High School, known colloquially as "CBRH", is a Canadian secondary school in Corner Brook, Newfoundland and Labrador. It is one of the largest schools in the province of Newfoundland and Labrador; it also has the largest student population of any school in the province.

The school handles both English and French immersion streams.

During the 2016-17 school year, there were 728 students with a teaching staff of 48 and an entire staff of 72.

== History and characteristics ==
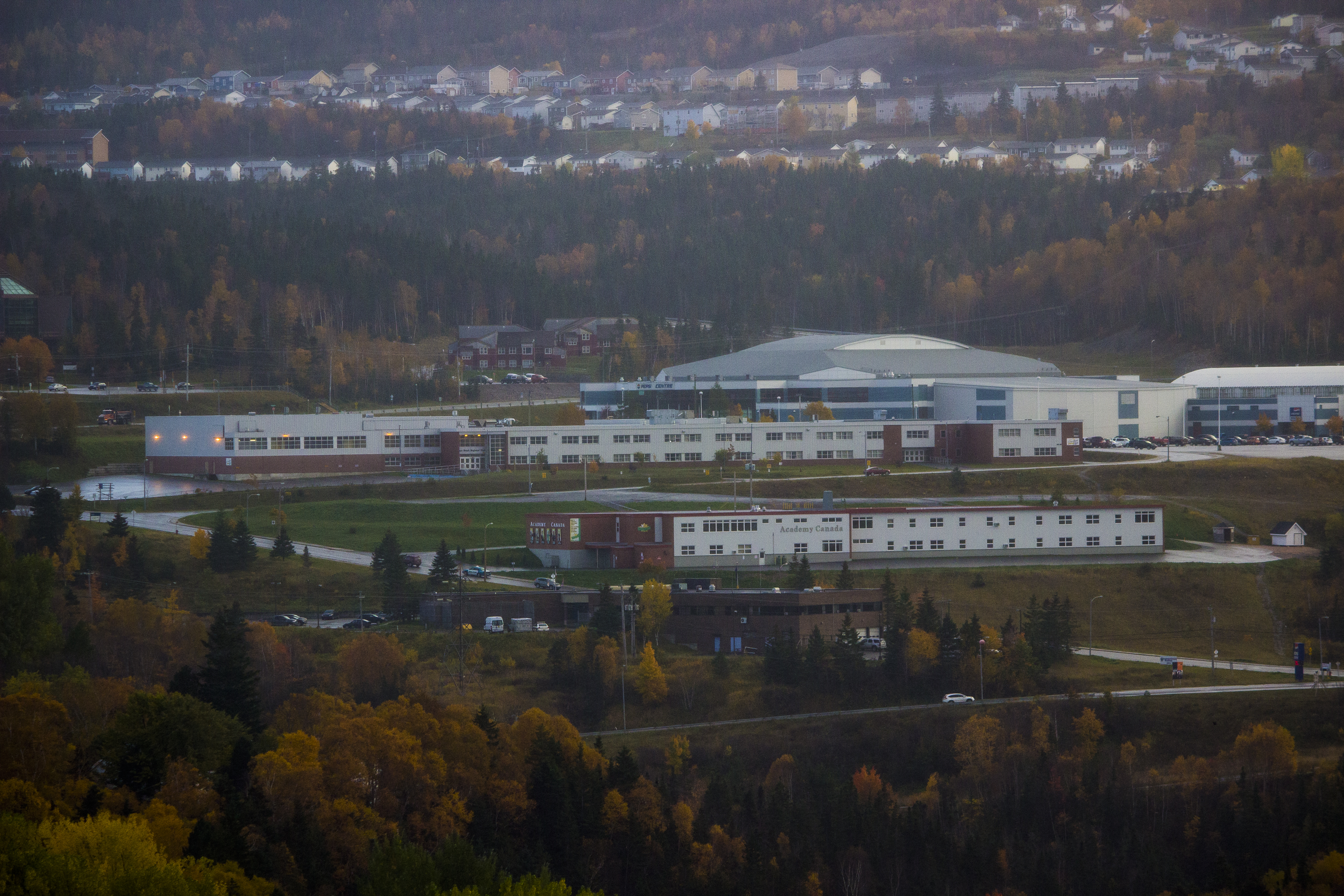

Until recently, the City of Corner Brook had two high schools: Herdman Collegiate and Regina High School. When the new Corner Brook Regional High project was announced by Premier Danny Williams, all students attended Regina High School under the name Corner Brook Regional High while Herdman was under complete re-construction. Renovations were completed in early 2009, and students were moved to the new Corner Brook Regional High School.

The school includes an Olympic sized Gymnasium, fitness center, one Cafeteria with stage, 3 canteens serving students daily, three Science Labs (Biology, Chemistry & Physics), five Computer Labs (two regular labs, two classroom labs, one staff lab), an acoustically treated multipurpose music room/auditorium with stage, and a library. It also has two workshops for technology/carpentry classes, as well as a food lab.

The school is one of the largest schools outside of St. John's, which has the largest student population in the province.

The school was the host of the 2011 Canadian Student Leadership Conference (CSLC), which brought nearly 1000 students to the school. CSLC 2011 Website. Also, the education facility recently hosted the first-ever provincial GSA Conference with approximately 125 students in attendance.

Corner Brook Regional High has had five graduating students selected as Loran Scholars, the largest number for any school in the province.

== Extra-curricular ==
Sports offered at Corner Brook Regional High include basketball, volleyball, hockey, archery, soccer, and wrestling. The school also has many different clubs such as Weightlifting, Outdoor Pursuits, and Cross Country Running. There are clubs dealing with the Arts as well, such as Choir, Chamber Choir, Art Club, Writing Club, Drama Club, and different Band ensembles. The School also features Humanitarian Clubs that raise money for worthy causes. Also supported are co-curricular activities such as robotics, Student Council, Envirothon, Kindness Club, and a Living Healthy Team.

The music program at the school is nationally and internationally renowned. In April 2014, the school played at a U.S. national festival at Carnegie Hall in New York. The school has a wind symphony, house band, and jazz band.

The school's "Titan Robotics" team also competes in the MATE ROV competition at the Marine Institute in St. John's every year and has been the recipient of many awards since 2009.
