= IYG =

LGBTQ advocacy group in Indianapolis

- Founded: 1987; 39 years ago
- Type: Nonprofit organization
- Legal status: 501(c)(3)
- Location: 3733 N Meridian St, Indianapolis, Indiana 46208
- Region served: Indianapolis, Columbus, Crawfordsville, Evansville, Northwest Indiana
- CEO: Chris Paulsen
- Website: www.iyg.org

IYG, formerly known as Indiana Youth Group, is an LGBTQ community center based in Indianapolis, Indiana. Founded in 1987, IYG is the oldest operating organization dedicated to LGBT youth and young adults in North America.

== History ==
The Indiana Youth Group was founded by Christopher T. Gonzalez and his partner Jeff Werner in 1987. Gonzalez was motivated to found the group after witnessing an increase in LGBT youth calling a suicide hotline while volunteering as a counselor for the Gay and Lesbian Switchboard.

In 2007, the Indianapolis Youth Group changed its name to the Indiana Youth Group and applied for a state license plate. They received the license plate in 2013 after a legal battle with the state.

In 2017, the Indiana Youth Group moved to its current headquarters at 3733 N. Meridian St. after raising over $1.8 million to purchase the building.

In 2024, the Indiana Youth Group changed its name to IYG.

== Services ==
IYG offers services including case management, mental health services, affinity groups, housing support, and workforce development. Additionally, IYG is the statewide administrator of the Indiana Genders and Sexualities Alliance, supporting the development and maintenance of GSAs at Indiana middle and high schools.
