= List of attractions and events in Indianapolis =

The following is a list of important sites of interest and annual events hosted in or near the city of Indianapolis.

== 0–9 ==
- 500 Festival Mini-Marathon
- 500 Festival Parade

== A ==
- American Legion
- Athenæum (Das Deutsche Haus)

== B ==
- Beef & Boards Dinner Theatre
- Benjamin Harrison Presidential Site
- Benton House
- Black Leaf Vegan
- Bona Thompson Memorial Center
- Bottleworks District
- Brickyard 400 (in Speedway, Indiana)
- Broad Ripple Art Fair
- Broad Ripple Park Carousel
- Brookside Park
- Butler University
- Butter Fine Art Fair

== C ==
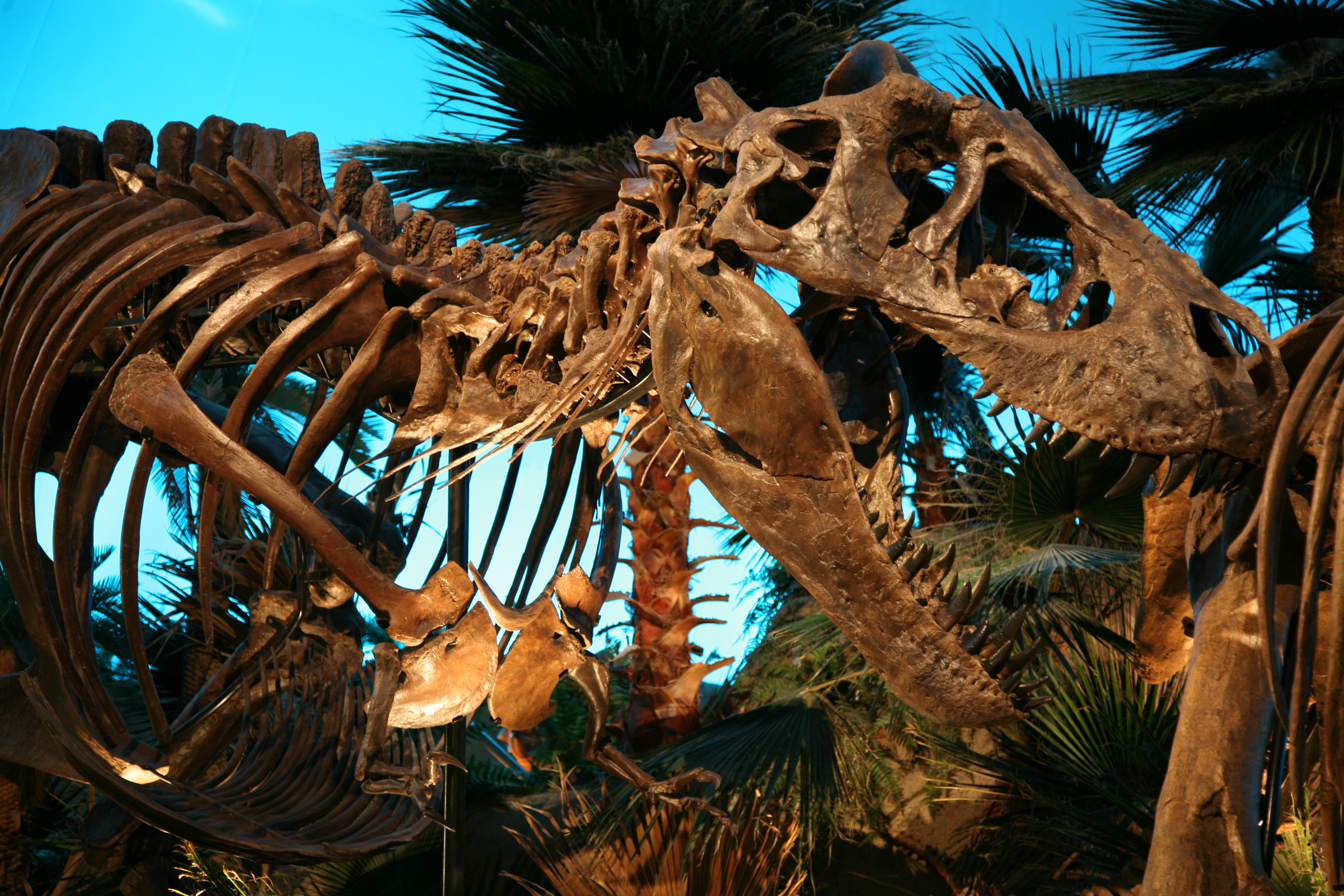
"Bucky," a juvenile Tyrannosaurus specimen at The Children's Museum of Indianapolis. The museum is the largest of its kind in the world.

- The Cabaret
- Castleton Square
- Central Library
- The Children's Museum of Indianapolis
- Chris Gonzalez Collection
- Circle City Classic
- Circle of Lights
- City-County Building Observation Deck
- Clowes Memorial Hall
- Conner Prairie (in Fishers, Indiana)
- Corteva Coliseum
- Crispus Attucks Museum
- Crown Hill Cemetery
- Crown Hill National Cemetery

== D ==
- Depew Memorial Fountain
- Downtown Olly's
- Drum Corps International World Class Championship

== E ==
- Eagle Creek Park
- Eiteljorg Museum of American Indians and Western Art
- The Emerson Theater
- Epilogue Players

== F ==
- Fall Creek Greenway
- FDIC International
- The Fashion Mall at Keystone
- Fountain Square Theatre
- Fort Harrison State Park (in Lawrence, Indiana)
- Freetown Village

== G ==
- Gainbridge Fieldhouse
- Garfield Park
- Gen Con
- Giorgio's Pizza
- Glendale Town Center
- Grand Prix of Indianapolis (in Speedway, Indiana)
- Greenwood Park Mall (in Greenwood, Indiana)

== H ==
- Harrison Center
- Harvest Nights
- Heartland International Film Festival
- Hilbert Circle Theatre
- Hinkle Fieldhouse
- Historic Irvington Halloween Festival
- Holcomb Observatory and Planetarium

== I ==
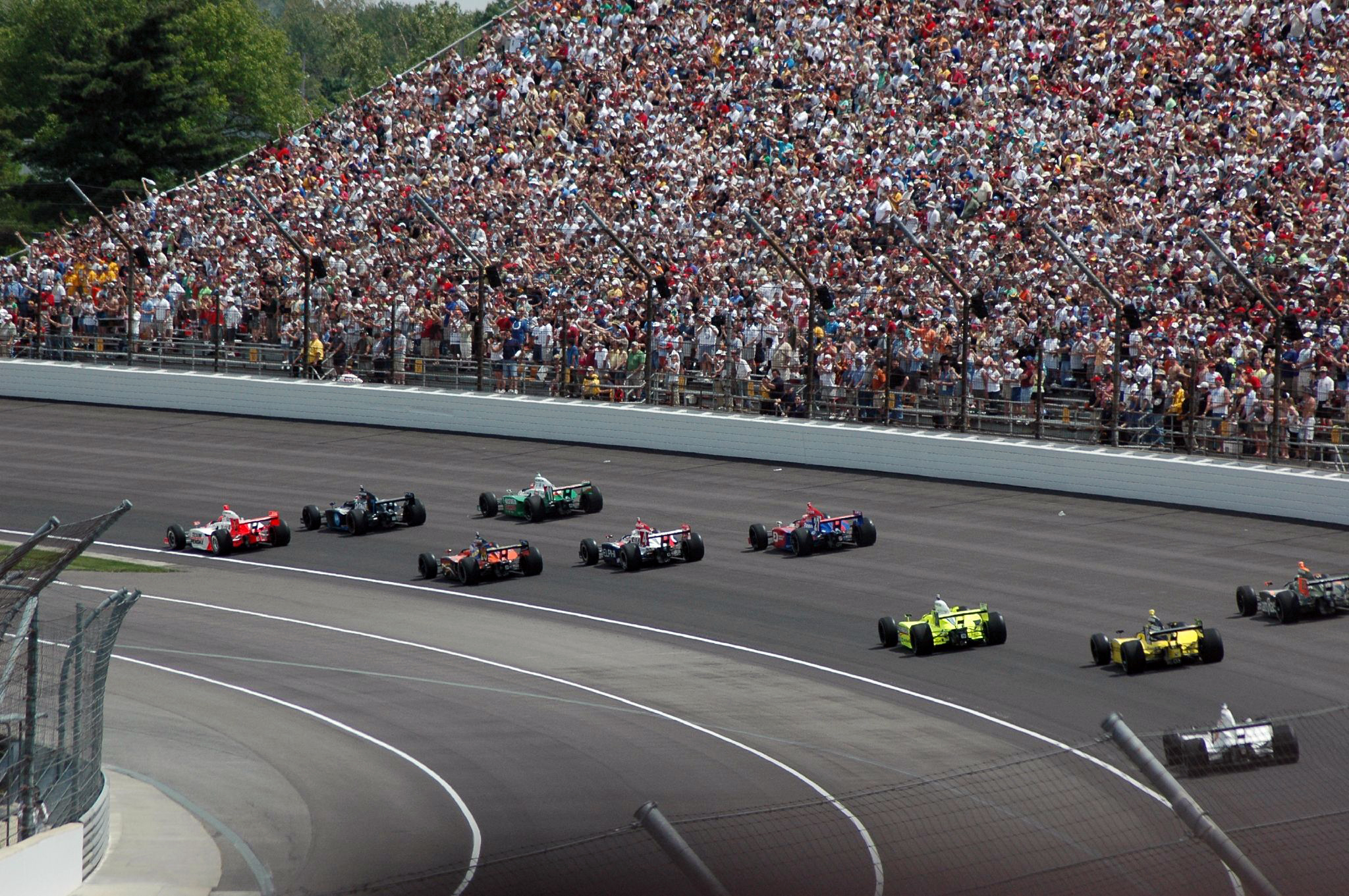
The Indianapolis 500 is known as the world's largest single-day sporting event

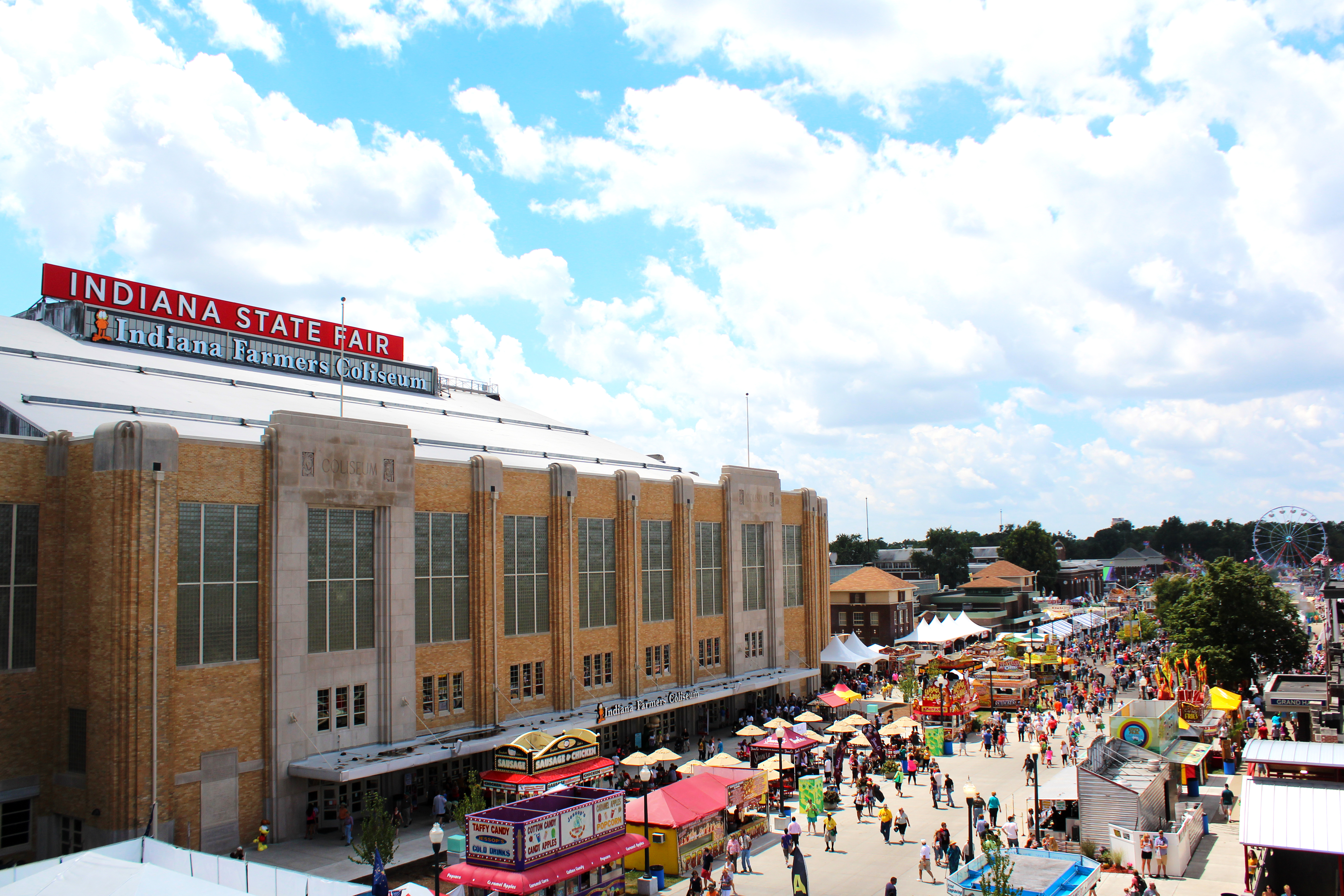
Indiana State Fair in 2015

- The Idle
- IMSA Battle on the Bricks (in Speedway, Indiana)
- Indiana 9/11 Memorial
- Indiana AIDS Memorial
- Indiana Black Expo Summer Celebration
- Indiana Central Canal
- Indiana Convention Center
- Indiana High School Boys Basketball Tournament
- Indiana Historical Society
- Indiana Landmarks Center
- Indiana Medical History Museum
- Indiana Repertory Theatre
- Indiana Statehouse
  - Public art collection (list)
- Indiana State Fair
- Indiana State Library and Historical Bureau
- Indiana State Museum
- Indiana Theatre
- Indiana University Indianapolis
  - Public art collection (list)
- Indiana University Natatorium
- Indiana War Memorial & Museum
- Indianapolis 8 Hour (in Speedway, Indiana)
- Indianapolis 500 (in Speedway, Indiana)
- Indianapolis Artsgarden
- Indianapolis Baroque Orchestra
- Indianapolis Catacombs
- Indianapolis Chamber Orchestra
- Indianapolis City Market
- Indianapolis Cultural Districts
- Indianapolis Cultural Trail
- Indianapolis Early Music
- Indianapolis International Airport
- Indianapolis Jewish Film Festival
- Indianapolis Monumental Marathon
- Indianapolis Motor Speedway (in Speedway, Indiana)
- Indianapolis Motor Speedway Museum (in Speedway, Indiana)
- Indianapolis Museum of Art at Newfields
- Indianapolis Opera
- Indianapolis Speedrome
- Indianapolis Symphony Orchestra
- Indianapolis Theatre Fringe Festival
- Indianapolis Union Station
- Indianapolis World Sports Park
- Indianapolis Youth Orchestra
- Indianapolis Zoo
- Indy Art Center
- Indy Classic
- Indy Film Fest
- Indy Irish Festival
- Indy Jazz Fest
- Indy Legends Charity Pro–Am race
- Indy Pride Festival
- International Violin Competition of Indianapolis
- Italian Street Festival

== J ==
- James Whitcomb Riley Museum Home
- Jazz Kitchen
- Julia M. Carson Transit Center

== K ==
- Kile Oak Tree
- Kountry Kitchen
- Kuntz Memorial Soccer Stadium
- Kurt Vonnegut Museum and Library

== L ==
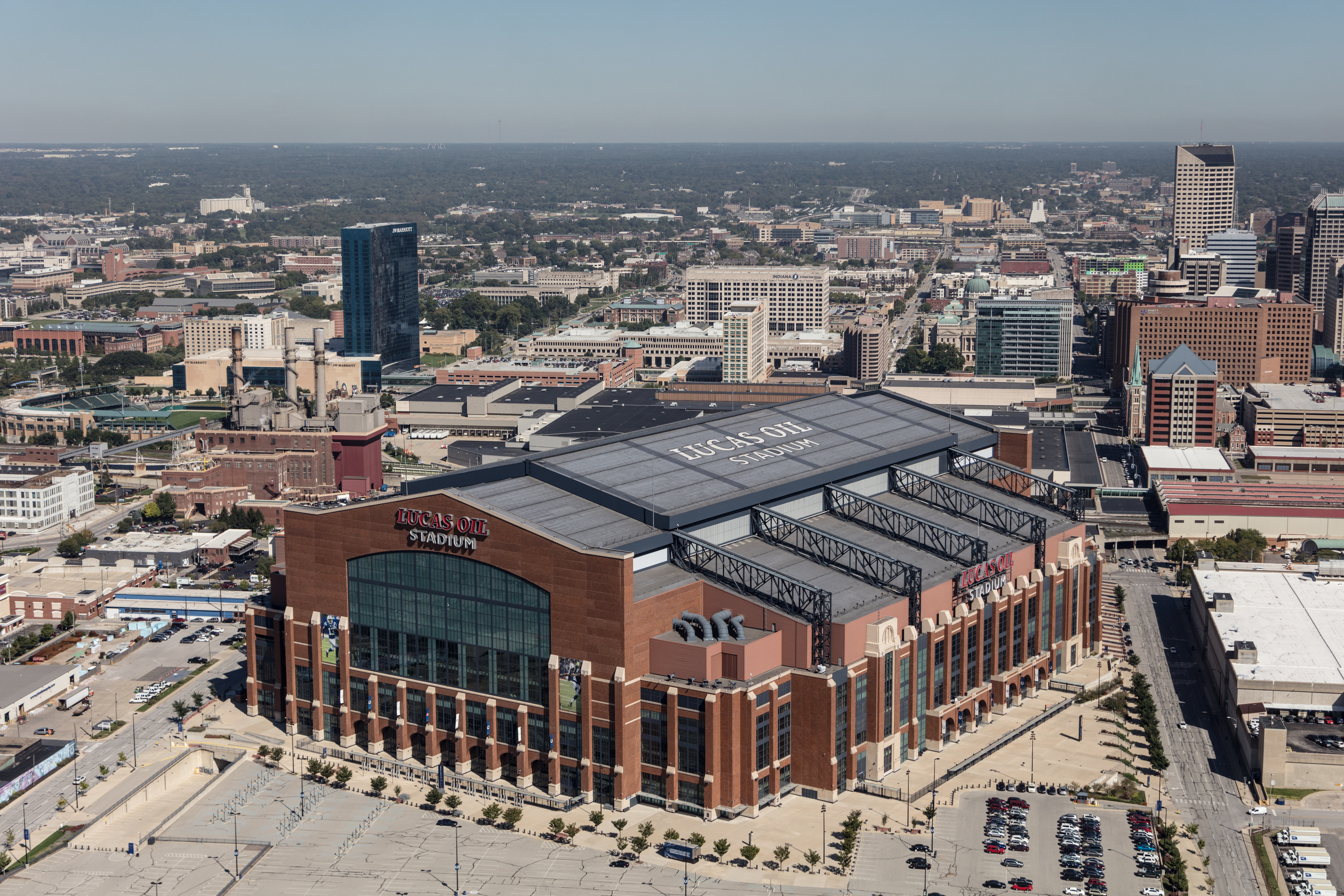
Lucas Oil Stadium, home to the Indianapolis Colts

- Landmark for Peace Memorial
- Long's Bakery
- Lucas Oil Indianapolis Raceway Park (in Brownsburg, Indiana)
- Lucas Oil Stadium

== M ==
- Madam Walker Legacy Center
- Major Taylor Velodrome
- Marian University
- Marion County Fair
- Medal of Honor Memorial
- Melody Inn (nightclub)
- Michael A. Carroll Stadium
- Military Park
- Monon Trail
- Month of May
- Mug-n-Bun (in Speedway, Indiana)
- Murphy Arts Center
- Museum of 20th Century Warfare (in Lawrence, Indiana)

== N ==
- NCAA Hall of Champions
- NFL Scouting Combine
- NHRA U.S. Nationals (in Brownsburg, Indiana)
- Nickel Plate Trail
- Nina Mason Pulliam Indianapolis Special Collections Room

== O ==
- Oldfields–Lilly House & Gardens
- Old National Centre

== P ==
- Pennzoil 250 (in Speedway, Indiana)
- Penrod Art Fair
- Phoenix Theatre
- Pleasant Run Greenway
- PopCon Indy
- The Propylaeum

== R ==
- Ray Bradbury Center
- Rhythm! Discovery Center
- Riverside Park
- Rolls-Royce Heritage Trust, Allison Branch

== S ==
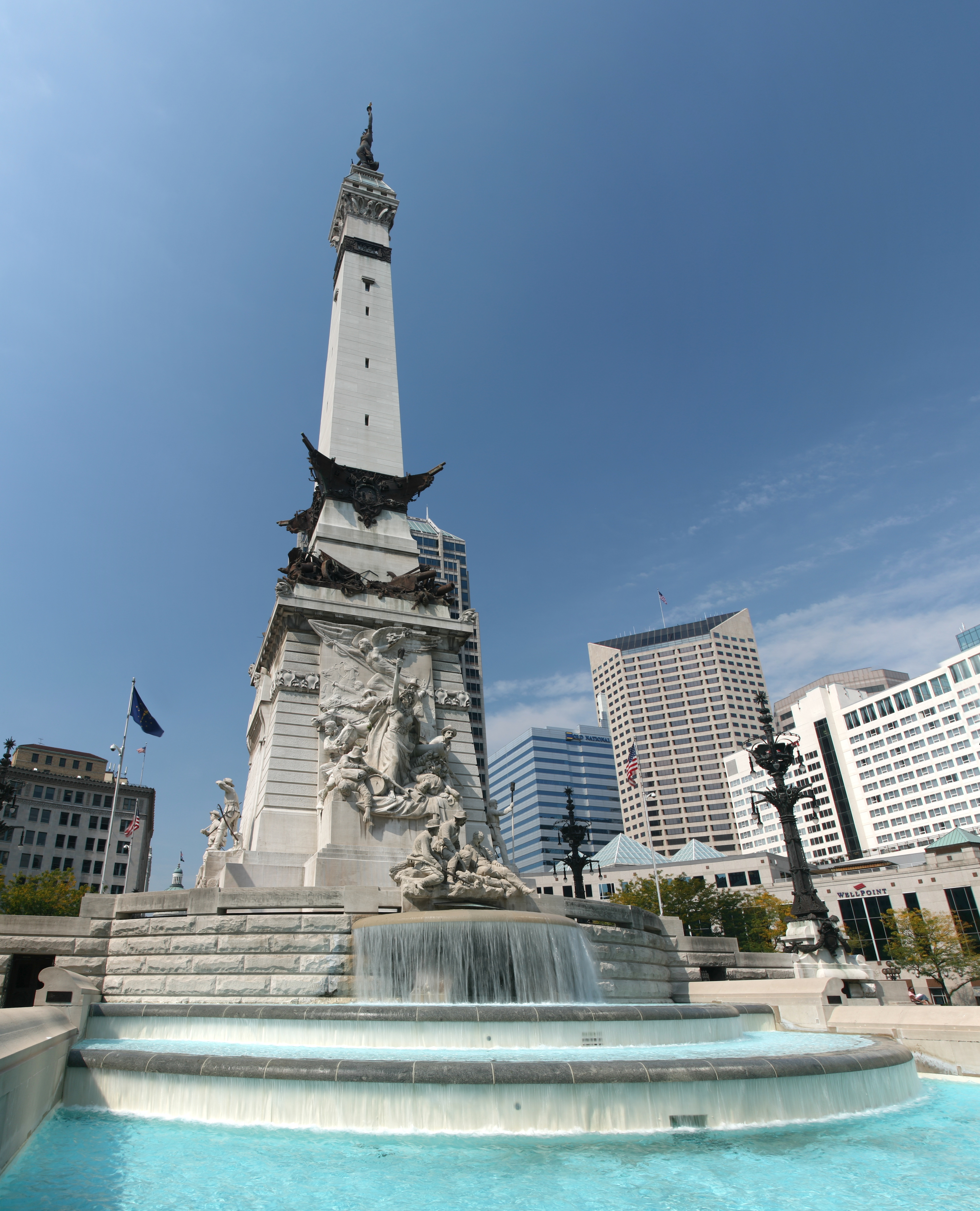
Dedicated in 1902, the Soldiers' and Sailors' Monument has become the city's de facto symbol.

- Scottish Rite Cathedral
- Sidney & Lois Eskenazi Hospital
  - Public art collection (list)
- Skiles Test Nature Park
- Slippery Noodle Inn
- Soldiers' and Sailors' Monument
- Southeastway Park
- Southwestway Park
- St. Elmo Steak House
- St. Patrick's Day Parade
- Starbase Indy
- Sun King Brewing

== T ==
- Town Run Trail Park

== U ==
- University of Indianapolis
- University Park
- USS Indianapolis National Memorial

== V ==
- Vicino (restaurant)
- Victory Field
- Virginia B. Fairbanks Art & Nature Park

== W ==
- Washington Square
- White River Gardens
- White River State Park
- Winterlights
- The Workingman's Friend

== See also ==
- List of parks in Indianapolis
- List of public art in Indianapolis
- National Register of Historic Places listings in Marion County, Indiana
