= Sarah Daniels (actress) =

American actress and singer

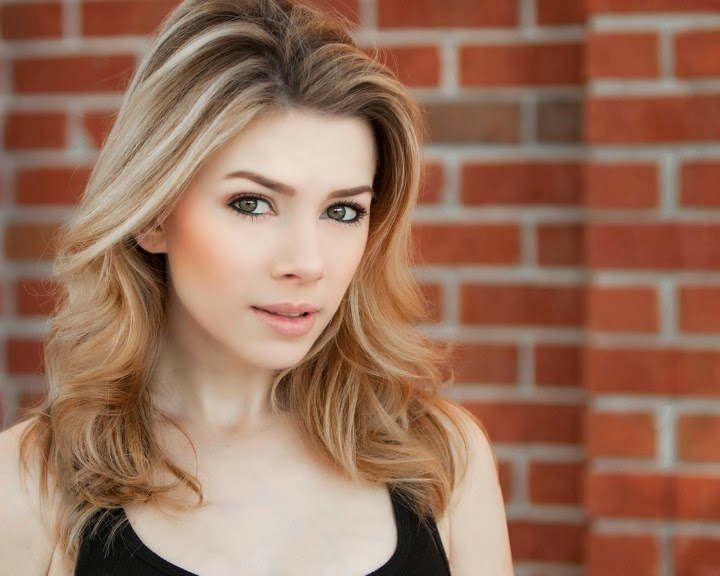
- Occupations: Actress, gamer
- Years active: 2001–present
- Known for: Acting, gaming
- Spouses: Skye Scott (m. 2018; div. 2019) Christopher Barrett (m. 2020)
- Website: sarahdaniels.com

Sarah Daniels is an American actress, singer, and Twitch streamer.

== Early life ==
Sarah Daniels was born in Tampa, Florida to John and Adrienne and has one older sister Alyssa. Daniels grew up in Celebration, Florida where from the age of three she was enrolled into dance lessons which she continues with today. At the age of 12, Daniels was offered her first national tour in "Bear in the Big Blue House Live", which was a nine-month tour of the eastern and southern United States.

== Career ==
Daniels is currently a full-time gaming streamer on Twitch.tv, and she is represented in esports and branded lifestyle by Alex Robles at Buchwald.

Daniels started to perform at The Walt Disney Resort from the age of sixteen and has performed in shows all over the United States throughout her career.

She played the lead role of Elle Woods in "Legally Blonde: The Musical" at the Fireside Theatre and has performed in "Merrily We Roll Along" directed by Broadway's Michael Arden.

As of December 2017, her most recent role was in the stage production of Mamma Mia at the Phoenix Theatre in Phoenix, Arizona, where she played the character of Sophie Sheridan. She reprised her role as Sophie in a new production of Mamma Mia! performing at the Arkansas Repertory Theatre from March 2018.

In May 2018 she appeared in the stage production of Grease at the Toronto Winter Garden Theatre as the Sandy alternate and later replaced Janel Parrish in the lead role of Sandy.

In February 2019, she appeared as Sandy in the stage production of Grease at the Beef and Boards Theater. At the same theater, she subsequently played Ariel in The Little Mermaid, and Amber in Hairspray.

== Personal life ==
Daniels is an avid gamer and is a full-time streamer on the service Twitch. Daniels recently opened up about her battle with a long term eating disorder at the hands of Walt Disney World in a five-page article in The Indianapolis Star In October 2017, Daniels became engaged to fellow actor Skye Scott. In September 2018, the pair married in a private ceremony, however, by December 2019, they were divorced. Daniels announced she had married Christopher Barrett on May 10, 2020, in a private ceremony, on her Twitter account. Barrett was a Game Director for Bungie's video games Destiny and Destiny 2.

=== Film ===
Film
Year	Film	Role	Notes
2014	Frozen on Broadway: First Look	Merry Villager	Short

=== TV ===
Television
Year	Title	Role	Notes
2016	OFF! A New Internet Comedy	Sachez/Rubin/Caldwell	Recurring
2014	Deadly Sins	Summer	Season 3, episode 6 - "Good Boys Gone Very Bad"
2014	The Dr. Oz Show	Herself - Nap Expert	Season 5, episode 138 - "The 10-Minute Fix That Cures Exhaustion"
2013	Deadline: Crime with Tamron Hall	14 Year Old Girl	Season 1, episode 11 - "The Great Pretender"
2010	52nd Annual Grammy Awards		TBWA/Chiat/Day Advertising
	Solace	Guest Star	Fine.Fiiine! Productions
	eCompliments	Lead	Black Castle Productions
	Jackie Evancho: In Concert	Featured Vocalist	PBS

=== Theatre ===
Theatre
Year	Title	Role	Notes
2022	Winghaven Park - A New Musical	Vera Webster	VHS Theatre dir Kelly Kitchens
2021	Newsies	Katherine Plumber	Beef and Boards Theatre dir Eddie Curry
2019	Hairspray	Amber Von Tussle	Beef and Boards Theatre dir Eddie Curry
2019	The Little Mermaid	Ariel	Beef and Boards Theatre dir Elizabeth Stark Payne
2019	Grease	Sandy	Beef and Boards Theatre dir Eddie Curry
2018	Grease	Sandy	Toronto Winter Garden Theatre dir Josh Prince, Lisa Stevens
2018	Mamma Mia	Sophie Sheridan	Arkansas Repertory Theatre dir John Miller-Stephany
2017	Mamma Mia	Sophie Sheridan	Phoenix Theatre dir Robert Kolby Harper
2016	Merrily We Roll Along	Female Swing	The Wallis dir Michael Arden
2016	Frozen	Young Elsa/Ensemble	Disney California Adventure dir Liesl Tommy
2014	Little Mac, You're The Very Man	Taylor Swift	Horse Trade/Less Than Rent dir Charlie Polinger
2014	Money$hot! A New Musical ***	Jenny Tillson	Orlando Fringe dir Benjamin D. Rush
2012	Legally Blonde	Elle Woods	The Fireside Theatre dir Ed Flesch
2012	Avenue Q	Kate Monster/Lucy the Slut	Theatre Downtown dir Steve MacKinnon
2012	Voyage Of The Little Mermaid	Ariel	Walt Disney World dir James Silson
2002	Bear In The Big Blue House	Jenny Mann	VEE Corporation dir Roy Luthringer
