= Gene Deer =

American blues musician (1964–2024)

Gene P. Deer II
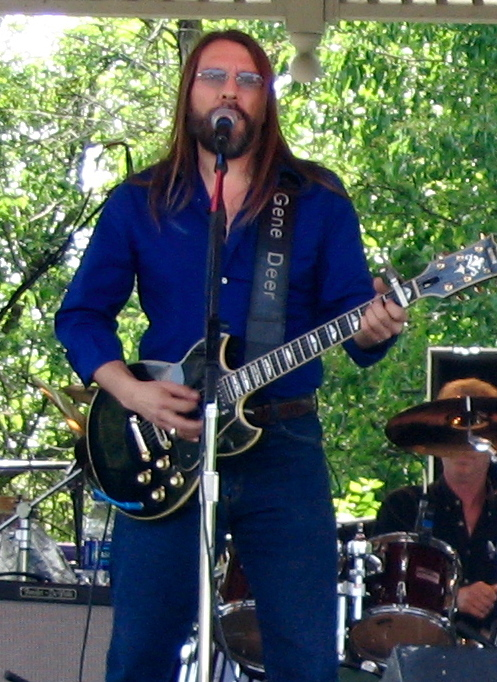
- Deer performing with a band in 2005

Background information
- Born: June 1, 1964
- Origin: Indianapolis, Indiana, U.S.
- Died: January 4, 2024 (aged 59) Indianapolis, Indiana, U.S.
- Genres: Blues, rock, country blues, country
- Label: Slippery Noodle Inn
- Website: www.genedeer.com

Gene Deer (June 1, 1964 — January 4, 2024) was an American blues, rock, and country musician and singer-songwriter based in Indianapolis, Indiana. Regularly playing shows at the historic Slippery Noodle Inn in Indianapolis, he recorded and released two LPs for the Slippery Noodle Sound label.

Deer was voted the "Best Local Blues Band" for nine consecutive years (1995–2003) by the readers of Nuvo Newsweekly.

In 2002, Deer was hired by Indy car driver Kenny Brack as band leader and musical director for Kenny Brack and the Subwoofers, which toured with the Indy Racing League in 2003. Kenny Brack and the Subwoofers released a CD, Live in Nashville, featuring former Lynyrd Skynyrd guitarist Ed King.

In 2007, he did a tour of South Africa with a support band called The Raging Calm.

Deer died in Indianapolis on January 4, 2024, at the age of 59.

== Discography ==
=== Soul Tender ===
Released 1994

1. C'mon Back
2. Nature of the Beast
3. Don't Turn Your Back (on the Blues)
4. Every'thang Gonna Be Alright
5. Midnight Healing
6. Be Set Free
7. Deep River Blues
8. That Ain't Why
9. Erin's Blues
10. My Baby She's Gone
11. Whisper in My Ear (bills to pay, bye bye)

=== Livin' With The Blues ===
Released 1997

1. Just Shoulda' Lay'd Off'a the Booze
2. Too Far Gone
3. I Want Out
4. One Foot on the Road
5. Good with the Bad
6. Livin' with the Blues
7. Smokestack Lightning
8. Potato Soup
9. Can't Afford to Pay the Rent
10. Blues in the Afternoon
11. Morristown
12. Dream
