= The Workingman's Friend =

Bar and restaurant in Indianapolis, Indiana, US

Restaurant information
- Established: 1918
- Food type: Burgers
- Location: Indianapolis, Indiana, United States

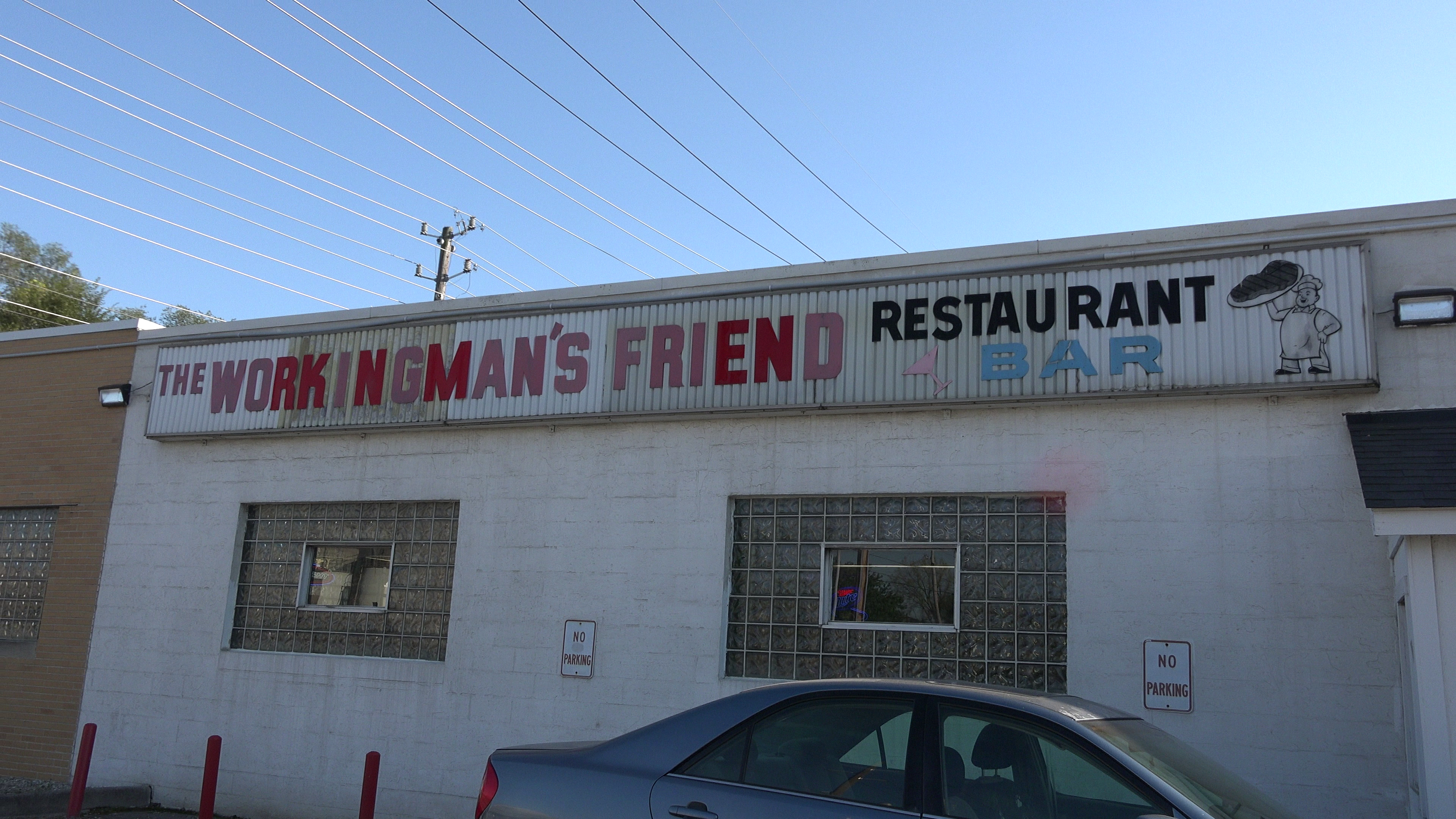
Workingman's Friend in Indianapolis

The Workingman's Friend is an American bar and restaurant in Indianapolis, Indiana, opened in 1918. In 2015, Thrillist ranked its burgers the best in the state; in 2022, Food & Wine Magazine similarly praised it. The establishment is cash only and patrons must be at least 21 years of age.

== See also ==
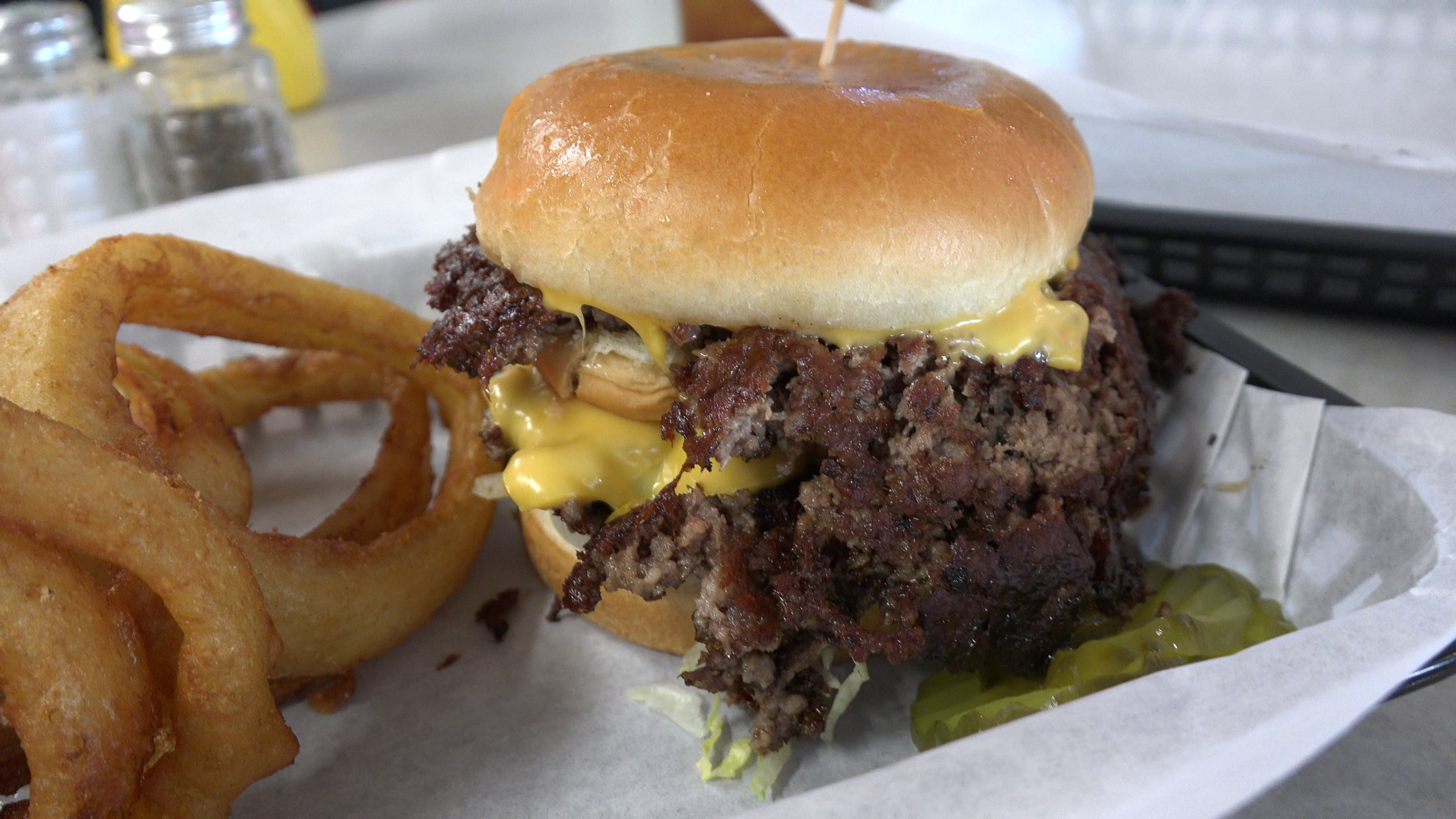
A burger at WMF

- List of attractions and events in Indianapolis
