= Vicino (restaurant) =

Italian restaurant in Indianapolis, Indiana, US

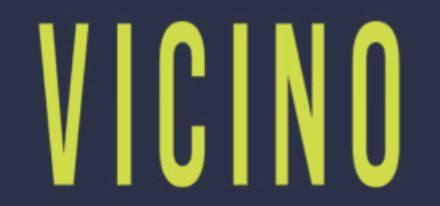

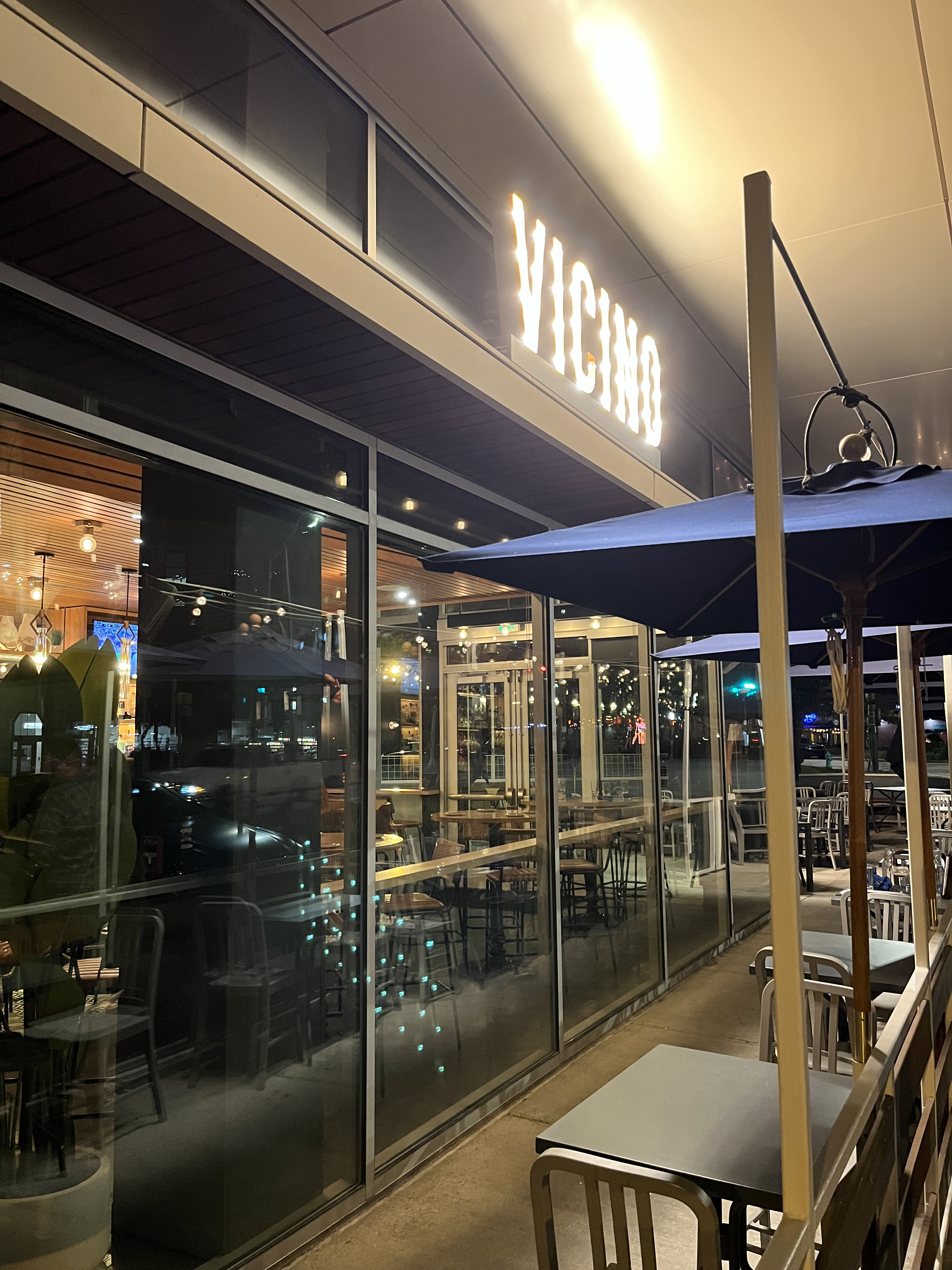
- The restaurant's exterior at night, 2024
- Interactive map of Vicino

Restaurant information
- Established: May 8, 2023
- Owners: Chris Burton; Gus Vazquez
- Head chef: Sean Day
- Food type: Italian
- Location: 350 Massachusetts Avenue, Suite 150, Indianapolis, Indiana, 46204, United States
- Coordinates: 39.7724°N 86.1530°W
- Website: vicinoindy.com

Vicino is an Italian restaurant in Indianapolis, in the U.S. state of Indiana.

== Description ==
The Italian restaurant and cocktail lounge Vicino operates on Massachusetts Avenue in downtown Indianapolis. The interior has blue crushed velvet seating as well as accents of gold and green.

The menu includes pastas, wood-fired pizzas (including a smoked salmon variety), gnocchi with chicken and pesto, a strip steak, and veal osso bucco. The shrimp pasta has bucatini, butter, cherry tomatoes, garlic, kale, lemon, parmesan, seafood stock, shallots, and white wine. The watermelon salad has almonds, arugula, feta, mint, and watermelon. Lunch options include paninis and other sandwiches. A smash burger is available during happy hour, which also features drink specials.

Vicino serves cocktails as well as wines from California, France, and Italy.

== History ==
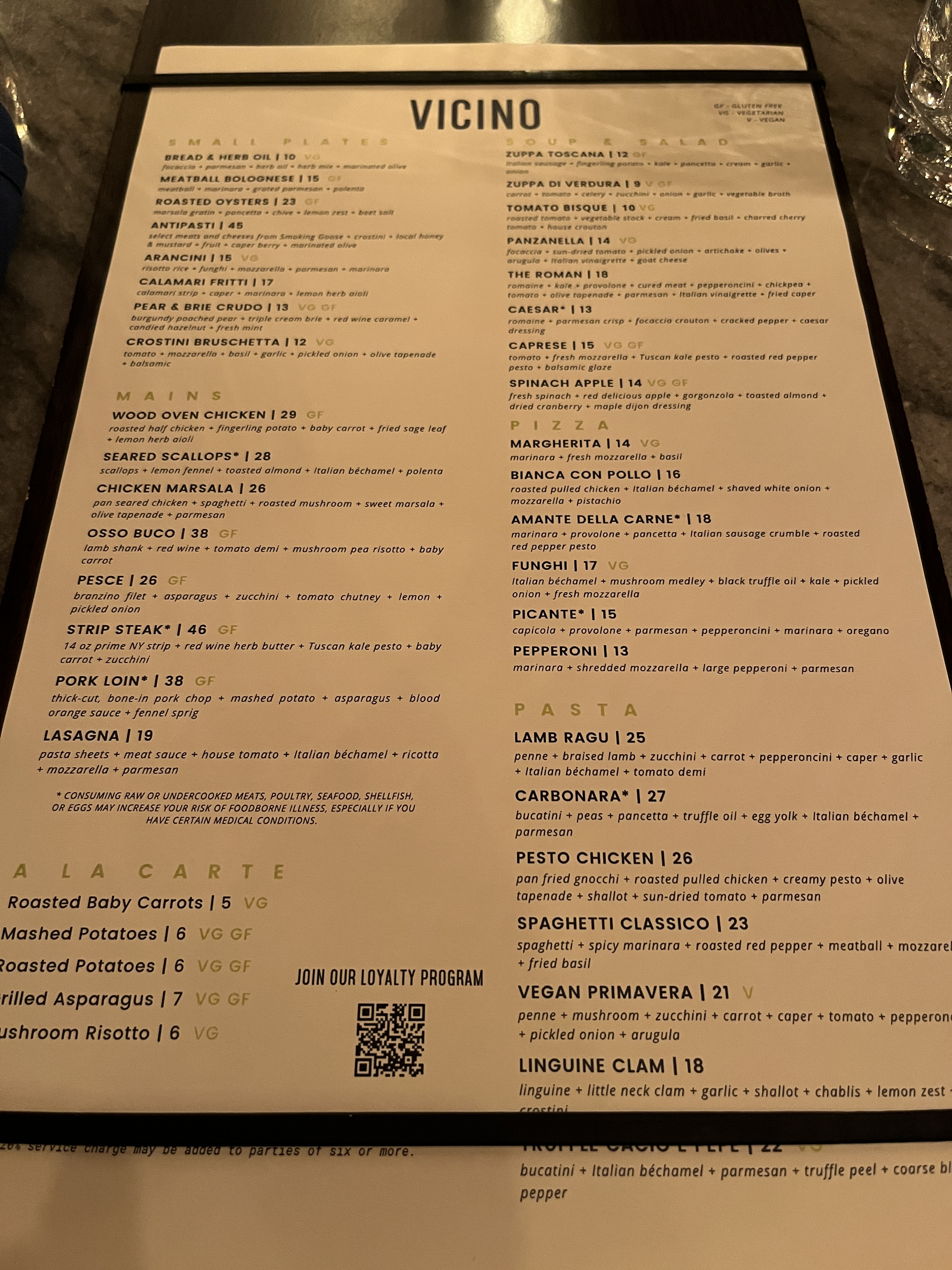
Food menu, 2024

Vicino was opened by Chris Burton and Gus Vazquez, who also own The Oakmont. It opened on May 8, 2023, in the space that previously housed Hedge Row. Upon opening, Vicino was the first full-service Italian restaurant to operate on Massachusetts Avenue in over a decade.

Sean Day is the executive chef.

== Reception ==
Vicino was included in Indianapolis Monthly's 2023 list of the 25 best restaurants, as well as the magazine's 2024 list of best restaurants. Eater's 2024 list of the 38 "essential" Indianapolis restaurants says, "The modern Italian Vicino takes a 21st-century approach to trattoria specialties."

== See also ==
- List of Italian restaurants
- List of attractions and events in Indianapolis
