= Indianapolis Theatre Fringe Festival =

Fringe festival in Indianapolis, Indiana, US

- Status: Active
- Genre: Festival
- Frequency: Annually
- Inaugurated: 2005
- Previous event: August 17–September 3, 2023
- Website: indyfringe.org

The Indianapolis Theatre Fringe Festival, nicknamed "IndyFringe," is a 10-day showcase of traditional and non-traditional theatre, dance, music, improvisation and a wide range of other performance and visual arts, performed and created by local, national and international artists. The festival features performances by 64 adult performance groups.

== History ==
Based on the Fringe Festival that began in Edinburgh, Scotland, when rogue theater groups set up on the edges of the Edinburgh International Festival in 1947, IndyFringe's roots are found in Mayor Bart Peterson's Cultural Tourism Initiative in 2001. A group of experts and citizens met for "Theatre City Indianapolis 2012" and came up with the idea for an Indianapolis Theatre Fringe Festival. Central Indiana Community foundation donated seed money and IndyFringe was born.

The first year for the festival was 2005. The festival drew 4,775 patrons in its inaugural year. In 2006, a substantial increase in publicity and media coverage resulted in attendance doubling, with 9,677 patrons. In 2010, there were 11,214 attendees.

== Schedule ==
The festival is typically presented in mid August. The 2017 festival is scheduled for August 17–27, 2017.

Performance groups are invited to apply for a place in the festival in November each year. Sixty-four groups perform on eight different stages. Approximately half of the groups are local and half are national and international.

Performances are presented at eight Indianapolis area venues: the Phoenix Theatre, ComedySportz Theatre, Theatre on the Square, IndyFringe Basile Theatre, Indy Eleven Theatre and the Fireman's Union Hall. All are located in the Massachusetts Avenue Arts and Cultural District within easy walking distance of one another.

== Past performers ==
- ShadowApe
- Heartland Actors' Repertory Theatre

== See also ==
- List of attractions and events in Indianapolis
