= Indianapolis Early Music =

Nonprofit arts organization in Indianapolis, Indiana, US

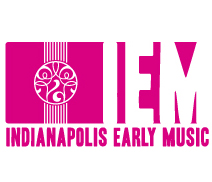
- Formation: 1966
- Type: Non-profit organization
- Headquarters: Indianapolis, Indiana, U.S.

Indianapolis Early Music (IEM) is a non-profit organization established in Indianapolis in 1966 to organize concerts featuring music of the medieval, renaissance, baroque, and early classic eras. Since 1966, it has produced the annual Indianapolis Early Music Festival, the oldest continuous Early Music festival in the United States.

Its annual summer festival spans three weekends and features American and international performers who perform on instruments of the period. Beyond the festival, IEM also presents other Early Music concerts throughout the year while also fostering educational programs in Indianapolis schools.

== History ==
Indianapolis Early Music, originally known by its corporate name of the Festival Music Society, was founded in 1966 to provide music during the summer months when the Indianapolis Symphony Orchestra, now one of the few full-year U.S. orchestras, was on vacation. The IEM initially concentrated on the major works of the baroque era, such as Bach, Handel and Vivaldi. The range of music presented was soon expanded to include that of the Renaissance and Medieval periods.

Music played at IEM concerts is that of works generally composed between 900 AD and 1800 AD. Performances have included vocal music, both choral and solo; instrumental music, both ensemble and solo; and dance, court, folk and ballet. Among the more noteworthy early concerts was the 1977 performance of the cycle of seven Bach Partitas by harpsichordist Igor Kipnis in Indianapolis just before making his Grammy-nominated recordings of them for Angel Records.

== Outreach ==
IEM has a long association with public radio. Selections of IEM concerts throughout the United States and Canada are broadcast on the program Performance Today. Selections are regularly featured on the WFIU's nationally distributed Early Music program, Harmonia. In addition, IEM has conducted workshops in Early Music and dance, presented a symposium and exposition of historical musical instruments, and sponsored the Collegiate Virtuoso competition. In 2016 and 2020, it co-presented the Indianapolis International Baroque Competition with the Indianapolis Baroque Orchestra. Prizes include a $10,000 first prize presented by the Gerber family.

== Artistic and music directors ==
The position of IEM music director was held by Frank Cooper for 35 years. A former member of the faculty of Butler University, Cooper is currently Research Professor of Music in the Department of Musicology at the University of Miami in Coral Gables, Florida and Associate Curator of Fine Arts at the Vizcaya Museum in Miami, Florida.

In 2008, IEM appointed Mark Cudek as its Artistic Director following Cooper's retirement. The 2001 recipient of Early Music America's Thomas Binkley Award for outstanding contributions to Early Music education, Cudek is the Director of the Peabody Conservatory's Early Music department at Johns Hopkins in Baltimore. Cudek is a performer specializing in guitar, recorder, crumhorn, bass viol, and percussion. Among the groups he has toured with are Hesperus, Apollo's Fire, Catacoustic Consort, and the Baltimore Consort. Cudek is actively involved in the Peabody Renaissance Ensemble and was creator and Director of the High School Early Music Program at the Interlochen Arts Camp in Michigan. He is the creator of a Masters program at Peabody; instituted a new Baroque Orchestra, and has developed an Early Music program at the Walters Art Museum in Baltimore. Mark Cudek earned a B.F.A. from the University of New York and M.Music from the Peabody Institute.

== See also ==
- List of attractions and events in Indianapolis
