= Giorgio's Pizza =

Italian restaurant in Indianapolis, Indiana, US

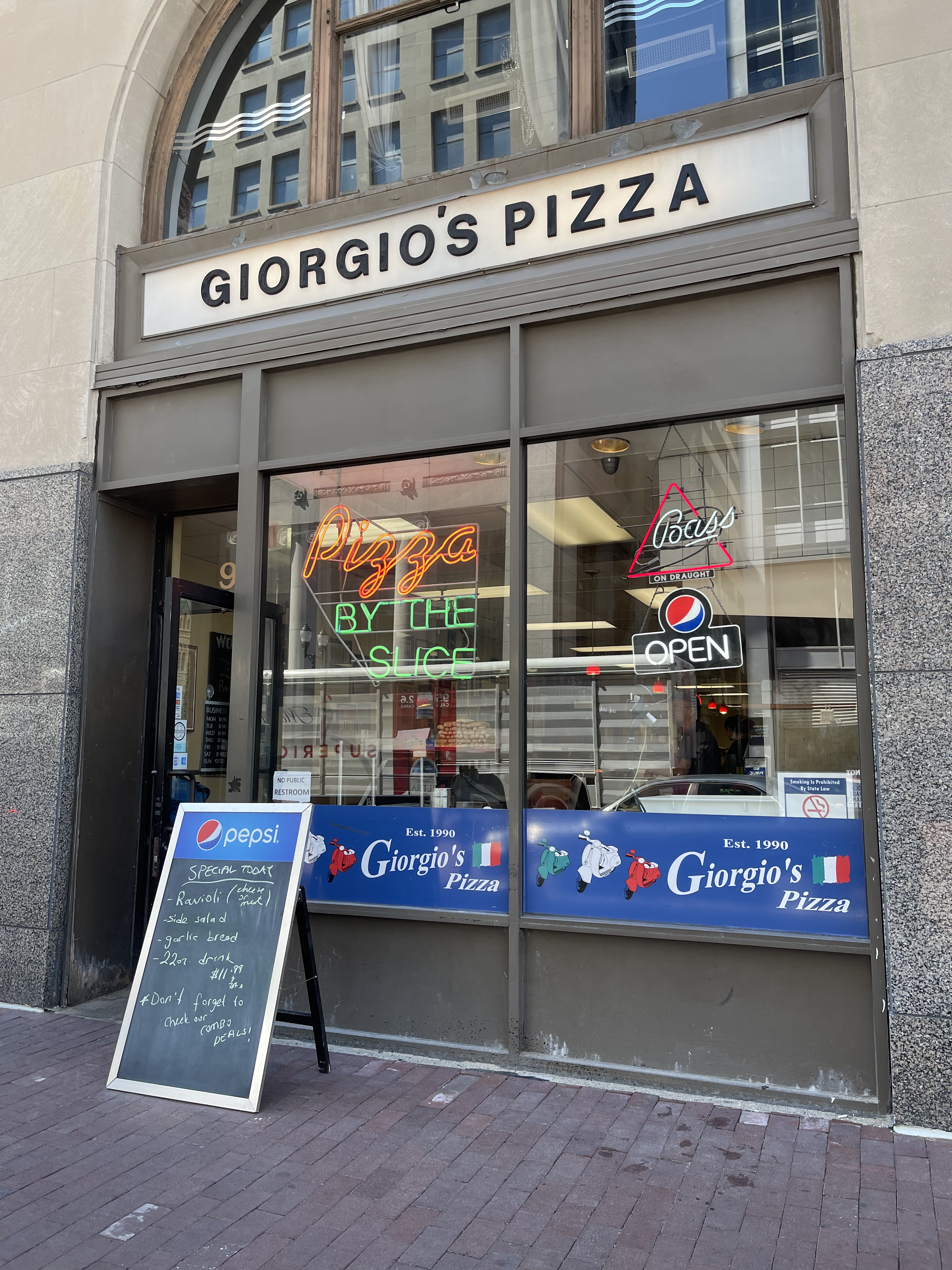
- The restaurant's exterior, 2022
- Interactive map of Giorgio's Pizza

Restaurant information
- Established: 1990
- Owners: Elif Ozdemir; George Stergiopoulos
- Previous owners: Giorgio Migliaccio; Bettina Migliaccio
- Food type: Italian
- Location: 9 East Market Street, Indianapolis, Indiana, 46204, United States
- Coordinates: 39°46′06″N 86°09′25″W

Giorgio's Pizza is a pizzeria in Indianapolis, in the U.S. state of Indiana. Giorgio and Bettina Migliaccio opened Giorgio's in 1990, near Monument Circle. Elif Ozdemir and George Stergiopoulos are the current co-owners. In addition to New York-style pizza, the business serves calzones, pastas, salads, and sandwiches. Giorgio's has garnered a positive reception.

== Description ==
The pizzeria Giorgio's Pizza operates near Monument Circle in Downtown Indianapolis. It has a seating capacity of 190 people. The menu includes New York-style pizza, salads, calzones, and pizza rolls. Pastas include lasagna, spaghetti, and ziti, and meatball and Italian deli subs are among sandwich options.

== History ==
Giorgio and Bettina Migliaccio opened Giorgio's in 1990. Elif Ozdemir purchased the business in 2019, and George Stergiopoulos was also an owner, as of 2020. The pizzeria's chef was born in Italy.

== Reception ==
In 2000, Indianapolis Monthly said Giorgio's "is mobbed with regulars who know a good thing when they eat it" and called the restaurant "an Italian oasis". The magazine has also said Giorgio's "easily boasts the best slice of cheese pizza in town, plus darn good calzones". In 2022, Tripadvisor gave Giorgio's ratings of 4.0 for food, 4.0 for service, 3.5 for value, 3.5 for atmosphere, and 3.5 overall, each on a scale of 5. The pizzeria is among the city's best, according to Google reviews in 2024.

== See also ==
- List of Italian restaurants
- List of attractions and events in Indianapolis
