= Igor Kipnis =

German-born American harpsichordist, pianist and conductor

Igor Kipnis (September 27, 1930 – January 23, 2002) was a German-born American harpsichordist, pianist and conductor.

== Biography ==
The son of Metropolitan Opera bass Alexander Kipnis, he was born in Berlin, where his father was singing with the Berlin State Opera. Although Jewish, the elder Kipnis was popular in Germany during Nazism's rise to prominence. Employing the stratagem of a vocal injury, the elder Kipnis fled Germany for Austria. When the Nazis annexed that country, the family was touring Australia. From there they moved to the US in 1938. He learned the piano with his maternal grandfather, Heniot Levy; attended the Westport School of Music, and received his B.A. from Harvard University, where he served as the program director of WHRB, Harvard's undergraduate radio station. He studied harpsichord with Fernando Valenti, and made his concert debut in New York in 1959. He was an honorary member of Phi Beta Kappa (Harvard, 1977), and in 1993 he was awarded an honorary Doctorate of Humane Letters by Illinois Wesleyan University.

In 1969, he performed with the Naumburg Orchestral Concerts, in the Naumburg Bandshell, Central Park, in the summer series.

Kipnis lived in Redding, Connecticut. For five years he was president and artistic director of the Friends of Music of Fairfield County, the Connecticut chamber music series, in addition to having served thirteen years as co-artistic director of the Connecticut Early Music Festival. Dr. Kipnis was also a member of the faculty of Fairfield University in the early 1970s, teaching between tours.

He married Judith Robison on January 6, 1953. Their son, Jeremy R. Kipnis, became a film and record producer. Igor and Judith Kipnis divorced in May 1996, but reconciled shortly before her death on March 1, 2001.

He died in his home in Redding, Connecticut, of renal cancer. His last concert was a solo piano recital in October 2001, in San Francisco.

== Music career ==
Following his debut in 1959, harpsichordist, fortepianist, duo-pianist, and clavichordist Kipnis performed in recital and as soloist with orchestras throughout the world, including North, Central, and South America, Western and Eastern Europe, Israel, and Australia.

Igor Kipnis performed as harpsichord soloist with the New York Philharmonic, the Chicago, Pittsburgh, St. Louis, Louisville, Dallas, Denver, Baltimore, Milwaukee, Seattle, Vancouver, Honolulu, and National Symphonies, the Minnesota Orchestra, the Capella Cracoviensis, the Boston Pops, the Munich Philharmonic, the New Amsterdam Sinfonietta, the Los Angeles, St. Paul, Cologne, Israel, New Stockholm, McGill, and Polish Chamber Orchestras, the New York Chamber Symphony, the Smithsonian Chamber Players, the Sinfonia of Sydney, and the Academy of St. Martin-in-the-Fields. His appearances at international and domestic festivals included Bachwoche Ansbach, the Internationale Bachakademie Stuttgart, and Ludwigsburg in Germany, the Bath Festival in Great Britain, Gulbenkian in Portugal, Lanaudière in Canada, the Israel Festival, the Melbourne International Festival of Organ and Harpsichord, the Madeira Bach Festival, Poland's Music in Old Crakow, the Indianapolis Early Music Festival, and Prague Spring International Music Festival. In 1969, he was a soloist with the Naumburg Orchestral Concerts, in the Naumburg Bandshell, Central Park, in the summer series.

Kipnis's enormous harpsichord repertoire encompassed not only the traditional 16th through 18th Century composers but also included contemporary music and jazz as well. He is especially noted for his entertaining concert-length presentation, The Light and Lively Harpsichord, which samples the full range of the harpsichord repertoire, from Bach to Brubeck, as well as for his informal mini-concerts whose format he has extensively pioneered at college student centers throughout the United States, and, additionally, for his performances and recordings on related early keyboard instruments, the fortepiano and clavichord, and for directing ensembles from the keyboard.

In 1995, he formed a duo with New York pianist Karen Kushner, internationally performing works for (modern) piano, four hands.

== Broadcasting ==
A frequent guest on both television and radio, such as the syndicated program First Hearing, Kipnis for three seasons hosted his own The Age of Baroque over WQXR in New York and was host on WGBH-Boston's syndicated program, The Classical Organ. In 1978, he was the first harpsichordist to perform on the Grammy Awards telecast.

== Editions, reviews and articles ==
Oxford University Press has published numerous of his keyboard editions, including his anthology, A First Harpsichord Book. He was also noted for his record reviews and articles in such periodicals as The International Classic Record Collector, The International Piano Quarterly, Gramophone Early Music, Goldberg, Early Music America, the internet music magazines Music & Vision and Stereo Times, Stereophile, Audio, FI, Schwann/Opus, Stereo Review, The American Record Guide, Clavier, Opus, Chamber Music Magazine, Early Keyboard Studies Newsletter, and The Yale Review, as well as having written for The Washington Post, the New York Post, and the New York Herald Tribune. He was also involved in compiling A Harpsichord Resource Book for Greenwood Press, and editing the harpsichord and clavichord volume of a three-volume set – Encyclopedia of Keyboard Instruments, of which the harpsichord and clavichord volume was published in 2007, Routledge published the set – vol.1 The Piano (2003); vol.2 The Organ (2006); and Kipnis's vol.3 The Harpsichord and Clavichord (2007). Kipnis also wrote Instruments writing A Harpsichord Tutor for Oxford University Press, and, for Amadeus Press, preparing a biography of his father, the late Metropolitan Opera bass, Alexander Kipnis.

He was also for a time responsible for the covers and background sleeve notes for Westminster Records.

== Recordings ==
He was a prolific recording artist, with 106 albums to his credit, of which 93 were solo. Among the honors he received were 9 Grammy nominations, three "Record of the Year" awards from Stereo Review, the 1969 Deutsche Schallplatten Prize, and the 1988 Gold Star award from the Italian periodical, Musica. Keyboard, in that magazine's annual readers' poll, named him "Best Harpsichordist" in 1978, 1979, and 1980 and "Best Classical Keyboardist" in 1982 and 1986.

Among his last record releases were The Virtuoso Scarlatti, fifteen sonatas played on five harpsichords after historical prototypes built by Hubbard of Boston and Vivaldi‘s The Four Seasons, in which he directed members of the Connecticut Early Music Festival from the keyboard (both on Chesky Records – produced and recorded by his son, Jeremy Kipnis), Sony CD reissues of The Spanish Harpsichord, the complete Bach Harpsichord Concertos with Neville Marriner conducting, Bach's Italian Concerto and Second English Suite (together with works for clavichord), Harpsichord – Greatest Hits, as well as the complete Fantasias of J. S. Bach for harpsichord and clavichord (on Arabesque), A Treasury of Harpsichord Favorites and Mozart on the 1793 Fortepiano (two anthologies on Music & Arts), and Igor Kipnis – The First Solo Harpsichord Recordings (on VAI).

He recorded for Epiphany, Chesky, Angel (EMI), Sony Music/CBS, VAI, Arabesque, Music & Arts Programs of America, London (Decca), Musical Heritage Society, Intercord, Teichiku, Nonesuch, MCA, CRI, Grenadilla, Vanguard, Nitepro, King, Start, Golden Crest and Newport Classic.
