= Historic Irvington Halloween Festival =

Annual Halloween festival in Indianapolis, Indiana, US

The Historic Irvington Halloween Festival is a non-profit event founded in 1947 by the Historic Irvington Community Council in an effort to bring together residents, neighborhood organizations, and businesses in the Irvington Historic District of Indianapolis, Indiana for a celebration of heritage and community. The festival is currently the nation's second oldest and largest Halloween festival.

The festival encompasses the week leading up to October 31, culminating in a street festival on the final Saturday. East Washington Street is closed between Ritter Avenue and Arlington Avenue in Irvington to hold the street festival. Events include a 5-mile run, a pageant, live performances, contests, Halloween-themed movies, ghost tours, live theater, a "haunted" puppet show, and many other events.

The COVID-19 pandemic caused officials to cancel the 2020 festival and to hold the Pleasant Run Run in a virtual mode.

== Pleasant Run Run ==
The Pleasant Run Run, established 1982, is a 5-mile run and 3-mile family walk through the streets of Historic Irvington. It is named after the nearby Pleasant Run Creek and takes place during the final day of the festival. The run helps attract a large number of people to the Saturday events and is also Indianapolis' oldest 5-mile competitive race. Proceeds from the Pleasant Run Run benefit the programs of the Historic Irvington Community Council.

== Festival venues ==
The Irving Theatre: Built in 1913, the Irving Theatre was originally used for a nickelodeon. In 1926, the theatre went under major renovations; adding six rental units, a second story, and lengthening the theatre. Throughout the decades, the theatre's uses differed until it closed in the mid-1990s. It sat unoccupied until 2005, when it was reopened, and has been looking for funds to be renovated since then. The theatre is a hub for live music, films, and art, community, and private events. The Lazy Daze Coffee House is located on the east end of the structure and three apartment units are on the second floor. The Irving is one of the city's largest all-ages music venues. With a capacity of over 700 people, the theatre hopes to attract bands that would otherwise pass on an Indianapolis visit.

Ellenberger Park: Landscape architect and urban planner George Kessler developed this park and Pleasant Run Parkway in the early 1900s. In 1930, the park added a pool, and in 1962, an ice rink was installed, which was later closed in 2009. The park also includes two playgrounds, eight tennis courts, a baseball diamond, softball diamond, football field, fitness trail, beach volleyball court, and a hill for winter sports such as sledding and snowboarding. Ellenberger Park hosts outdoor movie screenings in the summer. In recent years, the city of Indianapolis has finished constructing the Pleasant Run Trail greenway. The trail currently runs 6.9 miles (11.1 km) and connects Ellenberger Park with Garfield Park, the oldest park in the city (est. 1873, renamed in 1881), on the old Southside of Indianapolis—significant northern and southern expansions are planned for the trail.

Irving Circle: At the center of Irvington is a small circular park surrounded by a round-about street intersection. The park includes a fountain, a bust of Washington Irving, and personalized brick paths.

Schools and libraries: Irvington is home to local schools and a branch of the Indianapolis Public Library. Thomas Carr Howe Community High School and George Washington Julian elementary school #57 are both part of the Indianapolis Public Schools. There are also two Charter schools. Irvington Community School is for grades K–8, and the other is the Irvington Preparatory Academy, serving grades 9–12. Together, these schools offer public education for grades K–12. Irvington is also home to the Roman Catholic school Our Lady of Lourdes, available for grades K–8. Irvington has a long history of libraries. In 1903 the Bona Thompson Library was open to Butler students and the public. Since then, a local Irvington library has always been open to residents in different locations ranging from homes to particular structures. In 1956, the Hilton U. Brown Library, named in honor of the Irvington resident, opened on East Washington Street. In 2001, a new Irvington Branch Library opened at 5625 East Washington Street. The former Brown Library building is now used for early education by Indianapolis Public Schools. Irvington was also home to the Children's Guardian Home on University Avenue, before being converted to a new high school for the Irvington Preparatory Academy.

== See also ==
- List of attractions and events in Indianapolis
- The Legend of Sleepy Hollow
