= Marion County Fair (Indiana) =

Annual fair in Indianapolis, Indiana, US

Coordinates: 39.72762°N 86.037415°W

The Marion County Fair is an annual fair held in Marion County, Indiana, United States. The fair was first held in 1930 and usually runs for ten days in late June, except that in 2020, because of the COVID-19 pandemic, the fair was moved to July 11–19.

The fair maintains a rural theme despite being located in the most populous county in Indiana, with 4-H exhibits, live music, traditional dance shows, and historical displays.

There was no fair between 1942 and 1945 because of World War II.

== See also ==
- Indiana State Fair
- List of attractions and events in Indianapolis
