= Black Leaf Vegan =

Restaurant in Indianapolis, Indiana, US

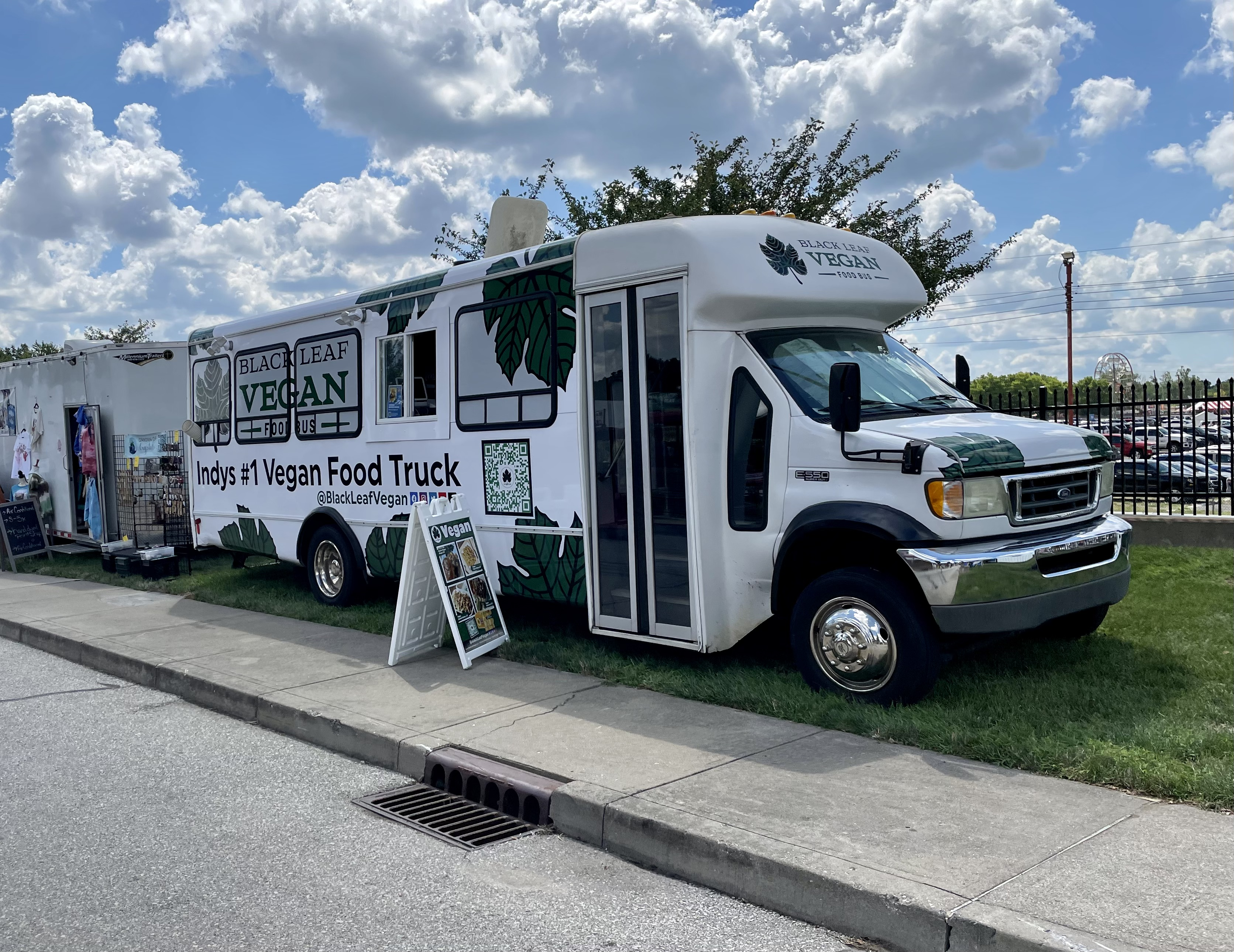
- Black Leaf Vegan food truck at the 2023 Indiana State Fair.
- Interactive map of Black Leaf Vegan

Restaurant information
- Established: 2021
- Owners: Taria and Derrick Slack
- Chef: Taria Slack
- Location: 335 West 9th Street, Indianapolis, Marion County, Indiana, 46202, United States
- Coordinates: 39°46′45″N 86°9′52″W
- Website: https://blackleafvegan.com/

Black Leaf Vegan is a restaurant, food truck operator, and caterer based in Indianapolis, Indiana. Noted for its all-vegan offerings and for being a Black-owned family business active in community advocacy, it gained rapid popularity after being established in early 2021 during the COVID-19 pandemic. The menu is described as all-vegan burgers, brats, tacos, and nachos, with the popular items being a bacon ranch burger and loaded nachos. Black Leaf Vegan was reported to be Indiana's first vegan food truck.

== Creation ==
Black Leaf Vegan was founded as a food truck by married couple Taria and Derrick Slack in spring 2021. Both Slacks were involved in education while also pursuing entrepreneurship. Derrick Slack was a teacher at Pike High School at the time, while Taria Slack, an education advocate, was elected to the Indianapolis Public Schools school board from 2019 to 2023. The Slacks went vegan 6 years prior for health reasons, after the death of Taria's mother, and had a goal of promoting healthier food options in the underserved neighborhood. When restaurants started closing due to the COVID-19 pandemic, the Slacks decided to open the food truck in their neighborhood. The Slacks have 3 daughters, all of whom work in the business and are also part owners—in order to promote generational wealth.

In 2023, Black Leaf Vegan was awarded a $10,000 grant by The Coramino Fund, provided by Kevin Hart, who founded his own vegan restaurant chain. The Slacks stated that they were planning a podcast sharing their perspectives on business and healthy lifestyles.

== Food trucks ==
The food truck operated out of the Riverside neighborhood, a historically Black area on the northwest side of Indianapolis, and was typically parked outside Cleo's Bodega—another local socially conscious Black-owned coffee shop and convenience store. In 2021, it was reported Black Leaf Vegan was Indianapolis' only all-vegan food truck. At the 2021 Indiana State Fair, Black Leave Vegan became the first-ever all-vegan food vendor, serving a meatless loaded bratwurst, among other menu options; they returned every year since, with other offerings including a vegan loaded nachos and a jackfruit sandwich.

While still in a truck, Black Leaf Vegan offered online ordering. The business also began operating a second truck out of the Madam Walker Legacy Center parking lot on Indiana Ave. In 2022, it was one of the top 5 vegan restaurants in Indianapolis on Yelp. In September 2022, the food truck served at BUTTER Art Fair. In the fall of 2022, Black Leaf Vegan introduced a new, larger food truck, made from a converted bus, to serve coffee and smoothies alongside food, and began operating it twice weekly at The Children's Museum of Indianapolis.

== Cafe ==
In October 2022, Black Leaf Vegan opened its first physical location, Black Leaf Vegan Café, in downtown Indianapolis at 335 W. 9th St., in the ground floor of an apartment building. The new restaurant allowed Black Leaf Vegan to expand their offerings to include more breakfast, drinks, and varied entrees. The brick and mortar location offers branded coffees, tea, shakes, smoothies. With morning hours, the café serves vegan bacon, breakfast sandwiches, and a daily quiche. Expanded entree options at the cafe include vegan lasagna and jackfruit sliders. The Slacks are planning to open future locations, including potentially in the Broad Ripple neighborhood.
