= Beef & Boards Dinner Theatre =

Dinner theater in Indianapolis, Indiana, US

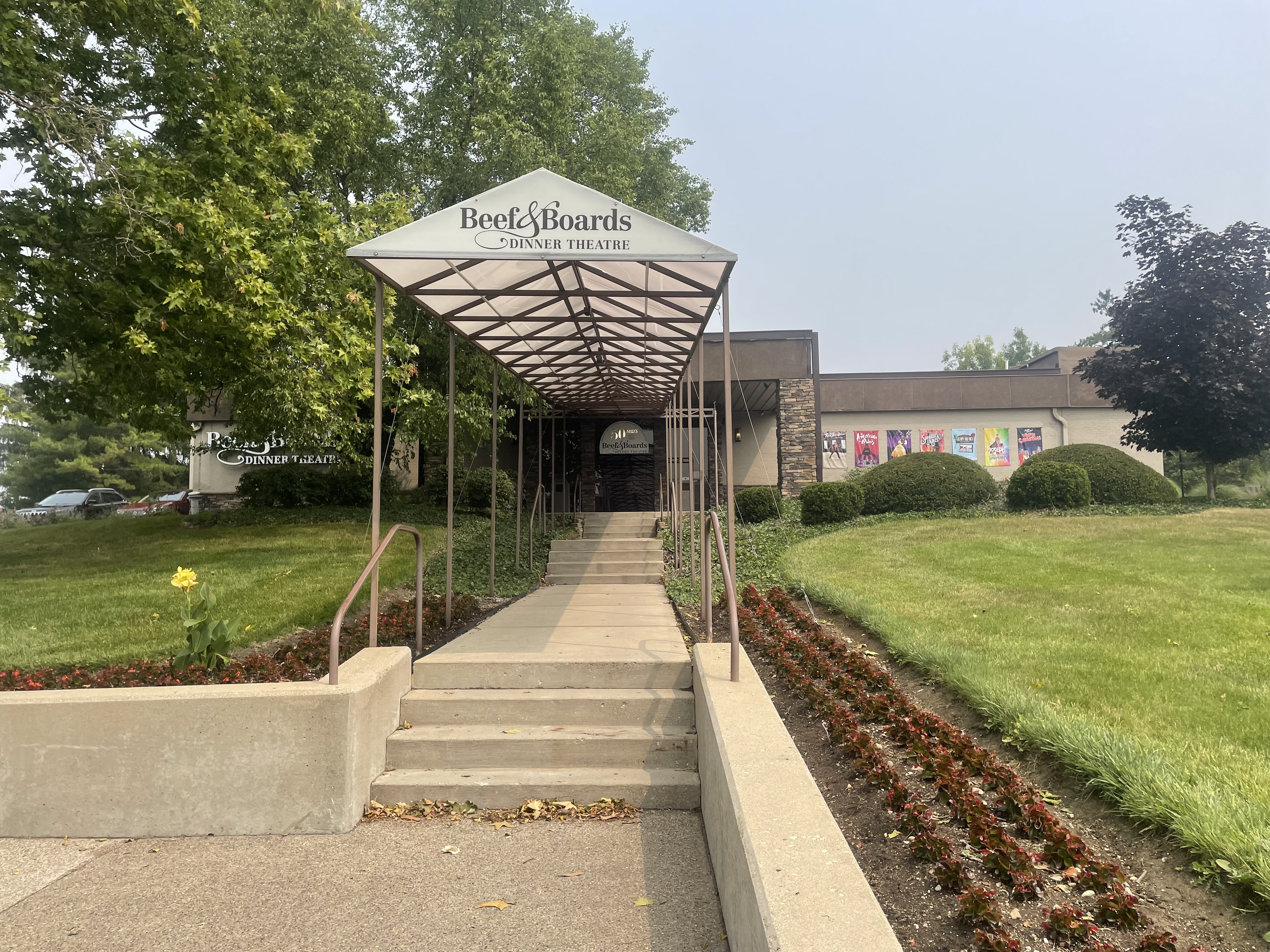
- Entrance to Beef & Boards Dinner Theatre
- Interactive map of Beef & Boards Dinner Theatre

Restaurant information
- Established: 1973; 53 years ago
- Owner: Doug Stark
- Previous owners: J. Scott Talbott; Windmill Dinner Theatre; Robert Zehr
- Food type: Buffet
- Dress code: Business casual
- Location: 9301 Michigan Rd., Indianapolis, Marion, Indiana, 46268, U.S.
- Coordinates: 39°55′19″N 86°13′31″W
- Seating capacity: 450
- Website: beefandboards.com

Beef & Boards Dinner Theatre is a dinner theatre located in College Park near The Pyramids on the northwest side of Indianapolis, Indiana, United States. It is a professional dinner theatre, providing Broadway shows and plays throughout the year. In 2019, the theatre hosted 149,700 guests. Beef & Boards Dinner Theatre is a member of Actors' Equity Association, the union for professional actors. The theatre gets its name "Beef" because of the hand-carved roast beef served before the performances, and "Boards" referring to the boards or stage of a theatre. Prior to 2020, the theatre also offered live theatre for children productions.

== History ==
Beef & Boards Dinner Theatre opened in 1973, a venture by Louisville, Kentucky contractor J. Scott Talbott, as part of a chain of Beef & Boards Dinner Theatres. The Indianapolis location is the only one remaining. By 1977, Talbott had sold the theatre to the Windmill Dinner Theatre group. In 1980, business partners Douglas E. Stark and Robert Zehr purchased the Indianapolis theatre. In 1998, Zehr sold his interest in the theatre to Stark, who then became the sole owner. Today, Doug Stark and his three children own and operate the theatre.

== Facility ==
Beef & Boards Dinner Theatre seats approximately 450 in tiered levels around a thrust stage which includes a turntable. Mainstage shows include music by a live band, located in a loft adjacent to the stage.

== Food ==
A dinner buffet prepared by the theatre's in-house chef precedes mainstage shows. Every buffet includes the theatre's trademark hand-carved roast beef.

== See also ==
- List of dinner theaters
- List of attractions and events in Indianapolis
