= Kountry Kitchen =

Historic soul food restaurant in Indianapolis, Indiana

Kountry Kitchen Soul Food Place
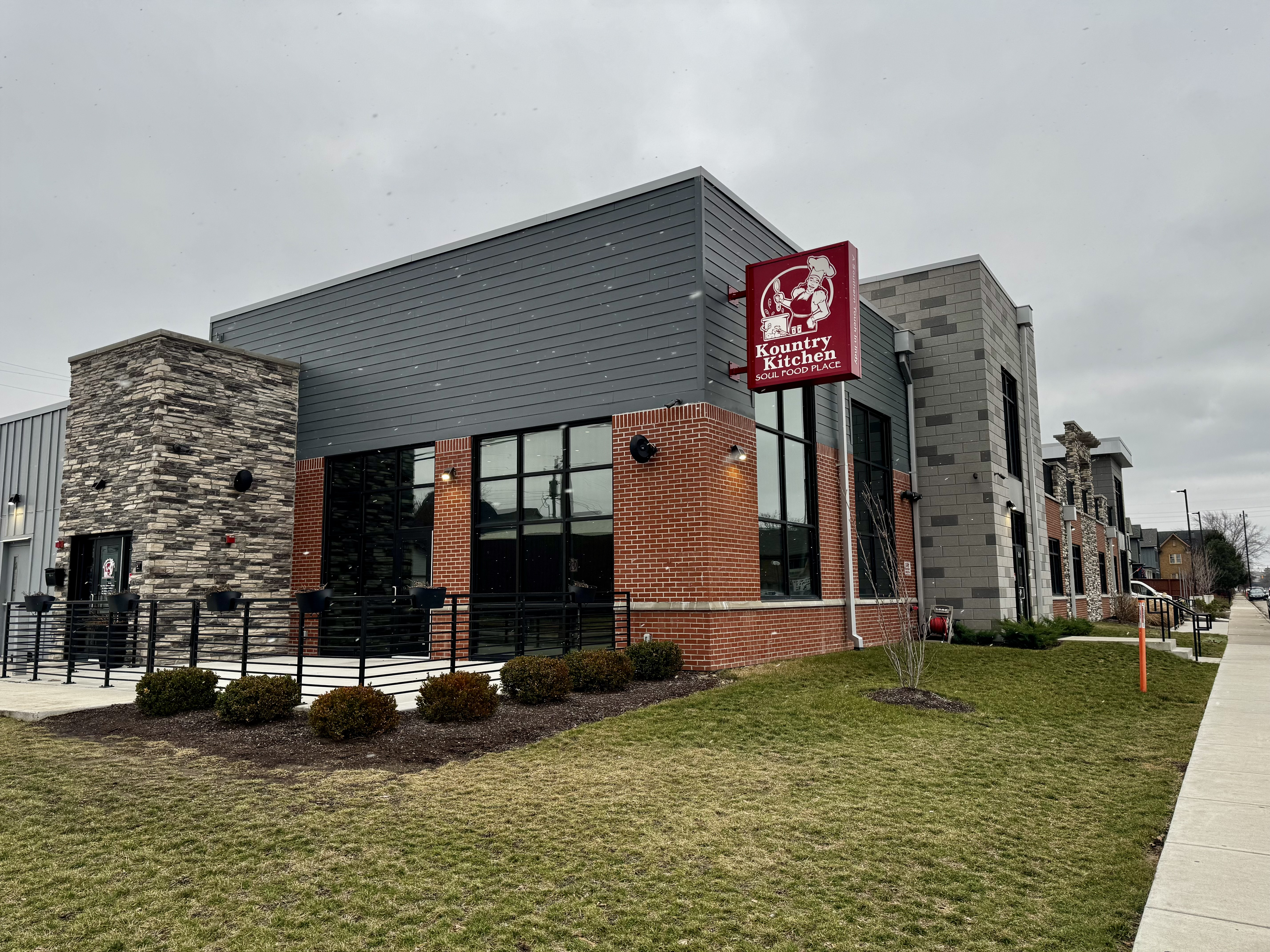
- Kountry Kitchen in 2026
- Interactive map of Kountry Kitchen Soul Food Place

Restaurant information
- Owners: Isaac and Cynthia Wilson
- Location: 1831 N. College Ave., Indianapolis, Marion County, Indiana, 46202, United States
- Coordinates: 39.7918888°N 86.1446062°W
- Website: https://kountrykitchenindy.com/

Kountry Kitchen Soul Food Place (commonly known as Kountry Kitchen) is a soul food restaurant and cultural landmark in Indianapolis, Indiana. Founded in 1988, the family-run establishment is known for its Southern-style cuisine, community service, and visits from politicians, athletes, and entertainers. After a 2020 fire destroyed the original building, the restaurant was rebuilt at its original College Avenue location and reopened in 2023.

== Cuisine ==
Kountry Kitchen's menu centers on traditional Southern and soul food dishes, such as fried catfish, smothered pork chops, macaroni and cheese, collard greens, candied yams, and cornbread, prepared in a home-style tradition.

== History ==
=== Founding and early years ===
Originally named "Jessie's Place", Kountry Kitchen was established in 1988 by Jessie "Ms. Jessie" Johnson White as a six-seat countertop diner in the Kennedy–King neighborhood of Indianapolis, at the corner of E. 19th St. & N. College Ave. The restaurant quickly became a neighborhood staple. White ran the restaurant together with her daughter, Nell Wilson, until her death. After White's death, Nell Wilson and her husband, Isaac Wilson operated the restaurant under the new name "Country Kitchen". Isaac kept the restaurant after Nell's death, and eventually remarried with Cynthia Wright-Wilson; the couple, who continue to run the restaurant today using Jessie and Nell's original recipes, changed the name to Kountry Kitchen.

In 2016, the restaurant's received a $400,000 grant from the Indianapolis Housing Authority's nonprofit development corporation to create new jobs by expanding the building and opening an event center.

=== 2020 fire and community reactions ===
In the early morning of January 11, 2020, a fire broke out at the restaurant's College Avenue location, resulting in extensive damage and the closure of the building. No injuries were reported. Initial reports noted the blaze started shortly after midnight and drew community attention as firefighters worked to contain it.

Community members rallied in support, raising over $50,000 to assist employees and rebuild the business, including contributions from Indianapolis Colts owner Jim Irsay. Rebuilding was also made possible by nearly $200,000 left from the earlier IHA grant. In addition, the Indianapolis Department of Metropolitan Development provided a $1.2 million loan using the Grow Indianapolis Fund, which supplies capital to companies in distressed neighborhoods.

During the closure and reconstruction period, the restaurant maintained a presence in Indianapolis by offering carry-out and catering from temporary locations. On November 3, Kountry Kitchen reopened operations from a temporary location at a converted industrial building about a mile east of the original structure.

=== Rebuilding and reopening ===
Plans to rebuild a larger restaurant and event space were developed in the years following the fire. In June 2022, the Wilsons held a groundbreaking ceremony at the original College Avenue site with city leaders including Indianapolis Mayor Joe Hogsett, City-County Council President Vop Osili, Pacers mascot Boomer, and comedian Mike Epps in attendance.

Kountry Kitchen officially reopened on October 19, 2023, at its original site following a ribbon-cutting ceremony attended by Indianapolis Mayor Joe Hogsett and other dignitaries. The new facility is larger than the original, able to accommodate about 300 people, with expanded dining areas and an event hall capable of hosting community gatherings.

== Recognition ==
=== Community engagement ===
Over the years, Kountry Kitchen hosted an annual Christmas Day meal serving thousands of free meals to individuals and families in need, reflecting its role as a community resource. The Christmas meal tradition started in 2007, and by 2019 the restaurant was serving over 3,000 meals in a large-scale event with the mayor of Indianapolis putting in a volunteer shift. The restaurant has also organized winter clothing drives for the community.

=== Honors ===
In a 2016 episode of Food Network's Top 5 Restaurants, Kountry Kitchen was named one of the top 5 soul food restaurants in the United States.

In 2023, Representative André Carson, congressman for Kountry Kitchen's district, put a statement in the Congressional Record honoring the restaurant on its reopening, calling it "a beloved community staple" and "recognizing the enduring legacy of this iconic Indianapolis destination".

=== Notable visitors ===
The restaurant has drawn local and national attention through visits by notable figures. Then-Senator Barack Obama ate at the restaurant during his 2008 presidential campaign. In 2016, John Gregg and Evan Bayh made a joint campaign appearance at Kountry Kitchen during their respective Indiana gubernatorial and US Senate campaigns. Entertainers and public figures such as Taraji P. Henson, Idris Elba, Jimmy Fallon, Danny Glover, Jesse Jackson, Jim Clyburn, Shannon Sharpe, Ben Crump, Lupe Fiasco, Cory Booker, and others have all visited the restaurant and appeared at public events. Mike Epps, who visited the restaurant growing up has made frequent appearances and remarks about Kountry Kitchen, in addition to supporting its rebuilding. The restaurant is also known to be frequented by sports stars—especially Indianapolis Colts players such as Indianapolis-native JuJu Brents—and the Colts spotlighted Kountry Kitchen during a Black History Month event with several players. In February 2024, NBA Hall of Famer Shaquille O'Neal stated that Kountry Kitchen was the "best soul food spot ever," singling out its mac and cheese, during the NBA All-Star Game hosted in Indianapolis.
