= Freetown Village (Indianapolis) =

Living history museum in Indianapolis, Indiana, US

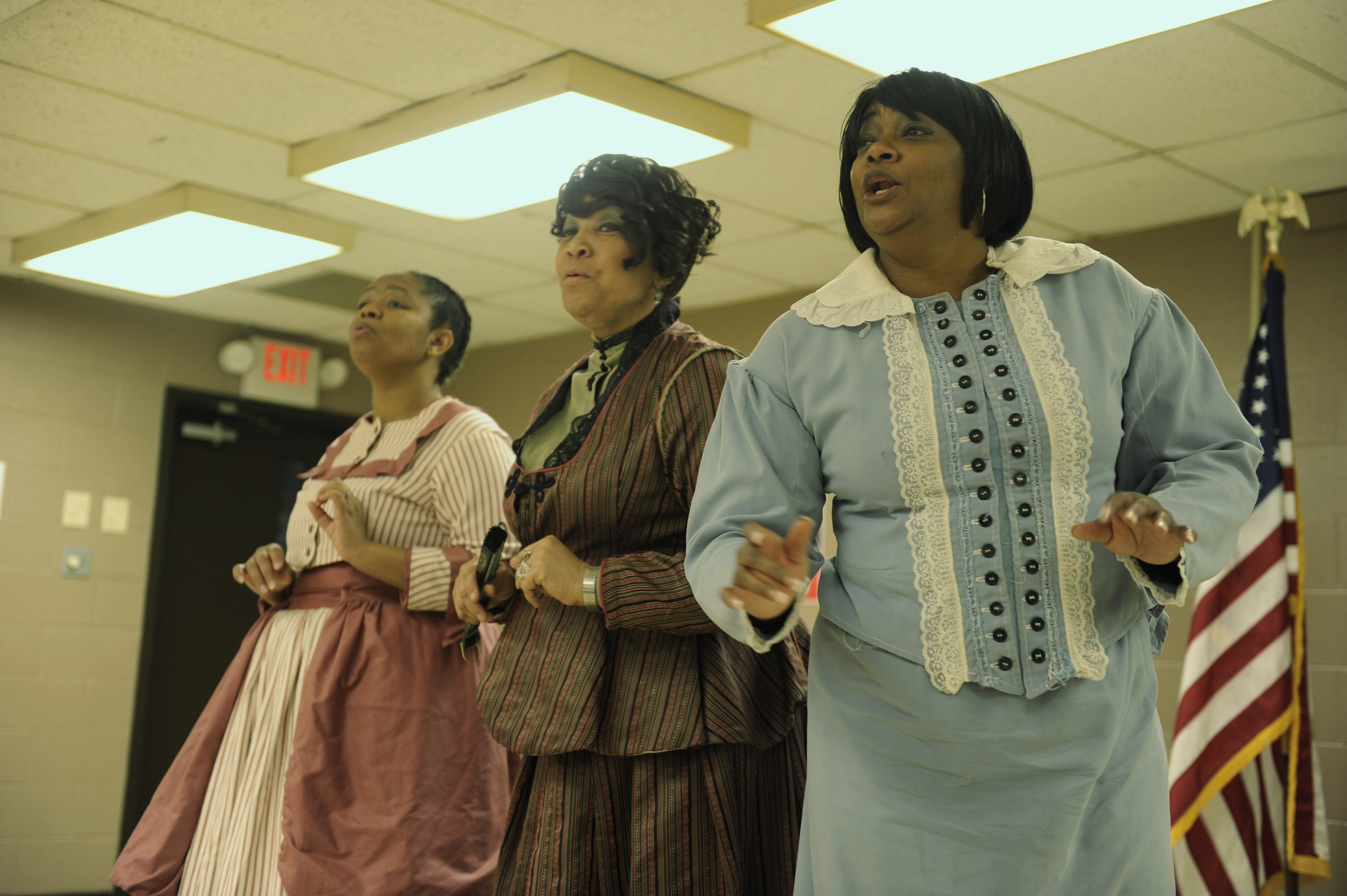
- Freetown Village singers
- Established: 1982
- Type: Living history museum
- Director: Stanley Durmonay

Freetown Village is a living history museum founded in 1982 by Indianapolis teacher, Ophelia Wellington. It is described as a museum without walls and brings to life the stories of over 3,000 African Americans during the post-Civil War era.

== History and development ==
Wellington combined her profession in education and background in performing arts to create programming that highlights historical accounts of 3,000 African Americans that migrated north to what was the old Fourth Ward of Indianapolis in the 1870 period. Actors and singers that portray different characters from the Freetown Village are sent to do programming throughout Indiana and surrounding states. Over 60 predominantly African American Indianapolis settlements that became home to former slaves fleeing the south, are represented in the Freetown Village portrayals.

The museum's creation was born out of the need to educate children about their history. Wellington was inspired to consider the importance of understanding the period after the emancipation after reading the Old Testament in the Bible. September 14, 2001, was proclaimed Freetown Village Day in Indianapolis by Assistant deputy Mayor, Keira Amstutz.

=== Indiana State Museum controversy ===
Freetown Village became a trusted organization in Indianapolis for its portrayal of Black history. In September 2001, Freetown Village was announced to be the first independent entity to be housed at Indiana State Museum, fortifying their collaborative relationship spanning 18 years. This came a year ahead of the state museum's grand opening in May 2002. The Lilly Endowment gave $2.5 million to support the creation of a space that would highlight and celebrate Indiana's African American history. The entire project would cost the museum around $5 million. A few weeks before the grand opening, the Indiana State Museum announced that the Freetown Museum would no longer be a part of the previously announced African American Living History theatre, citing expectation issues during contract negotiations. There were financial discrepancies over the financial responsibility that Freetown Village had in fundraising efforts. The Indiana State Museum decided to move forward with the creation of the exhibit and the CEO, Doug Noble offered for Freetown Village to perform at the new exhibit but not as a permanent residency.

== Programs and events ==
=== Freetown Village Singers ===
The Freetown Village Singers present history through song, many of which are songs that were sung at religious gatherings, work, and leisure time from over a hundred years ago. Most of the songs being folk songs and negro spirituals. During the presentation, the singers interpret some of the meaning behind the songs and the historical context of which the song was used.

=== Freetown Evening Dinner ===
This dinner is an opportunity to be immersed in the Freetown Village experience through food and authenitic period entertainment. A full course meal is served and guests are encouraged to be active participants in parlor games, storytelling and songs. These dinners happen periodically, year round and private dinners with groups of 30 or more can also be arranged.

=== The Madam Walker Story ===
Freetown Village brings the story of Madam C.J. Walker into a program that highlights her as a trailblazer, entrepreneur, and activist.

=== Conversation in Indiana African Amercican History and Culture ===
This program occurs monthly and highlights a variety of voices such as historians, researchers, and educators to share a deeper understanding of African American history in Indiana.
