= History of the Irish in Indianapolis =

Irish influence on Indianapolis, Indiana's culture

Those of Irish ancestry have had a strong impact on the city of Indianapolis, Indiana. In total, they are the second-largest ethnic group in Indianapolis.

== Antebellum ==
Most of the Irish immigrants to Indianapolis settled originally in east coast cities, but gradually moved westward to find better employment opportunities. With internal improvements seen as one way toward development in 1832, the Indianapolis newspaper Indiana Journal advertised for Irish workers to come work for the Wabash and Erie Canal, enticing them with $10 a month wages and cheap land. The Mammoth Internal Improvement Act defined the expectation of several Irish workers being available to work on such projects as the Indiana Central Canal and the National Road. However, once the Panic of 1837 struck, many Irish became unemployed.

The 1840s saw the Irish begin to form small communities within the city, especially in the same poorer areas that free blacks resided. They created what would become St. John Catholic Church in 1840, after celebrating their first Catholic Mass in 1837 at a tavern on West Washington Street. Greater numbers of Irish came during the decade due to the Great Famine of Ireland, and relief efforts were started by the Indianapolis Irish to support those still in Ireland.

== War years ==
At the start of the War, the Irish in Indianapolis mostly resided at Irish Hill, which gained a reputation as the toughest part of town, and Fountain Square. These areas tended to be next to railroad and streetcar lines, which relied on Irish workers. Other major employers of the Irish were construction and pork-packing.

At the start of the War, the Indianapolis Irish formed the 35th Regiment, also called the 1st Irish Regiment, recruited at the parish school of St. John's. They would later be combined with the 61st Regiment/2nd Irish Regiment. Some of the Irish, particularly those that belonged to the Irish Republican Brotherhood (Fenians) thought the War would be good practice for eventually fighting Great Britain. Two rival chapters of the Fenians in Indianapolis recruited 150 Irish veterans to invade Canada from Buffalo, New York, in hopes of severing Canada from Great Britain in May 1866. All Fenians who attempted this, including the 150 from Indianapolis, were arrested under orders of President Andrew Johnson on June 6, 1866.

== Post-war ==
By 1870, Indianapolis was the home of over 3,300 foreign-born Irish, with the total being 3,760 for all of Marion County. This saw the Irish attain greater political power in Indianapolis local affairs. Although the first two Irish mayors of Indianapolis, John Caven and Daniel MaCauley, were of the Republican Party, as a whole the Irish of Indianapolis sides with the Democrats, especially since the Republicans were the party of blacks, and Irish were opposed to them. This led to a racial riot on May 3, 1876, when in response to Irish Democrats intimidating black voters in Ward 6, a base of Irish Democrats in Indianapolis, 100 blacks from Ward 4 went to Ward 6, seizing hockey sticks to attack the Irish intimidators. The crowd was eventually dispersed by the city police and Mayor Caven, but not after gunfire was begun. Several blacks were injured, with one dying due to the riot. It was the worst in the city's history.

== 1900s ==
In 1910 the Irish population in Indianapolis was 12,225, of which 3,255 were born in Ireland, composing 5% of the total population of Indianapolis, and 15% of its immigrant population. During World War I the Irish would side with the city's German population in denouncing the Allies, due to their hatred of Great Britain.

== Today ==
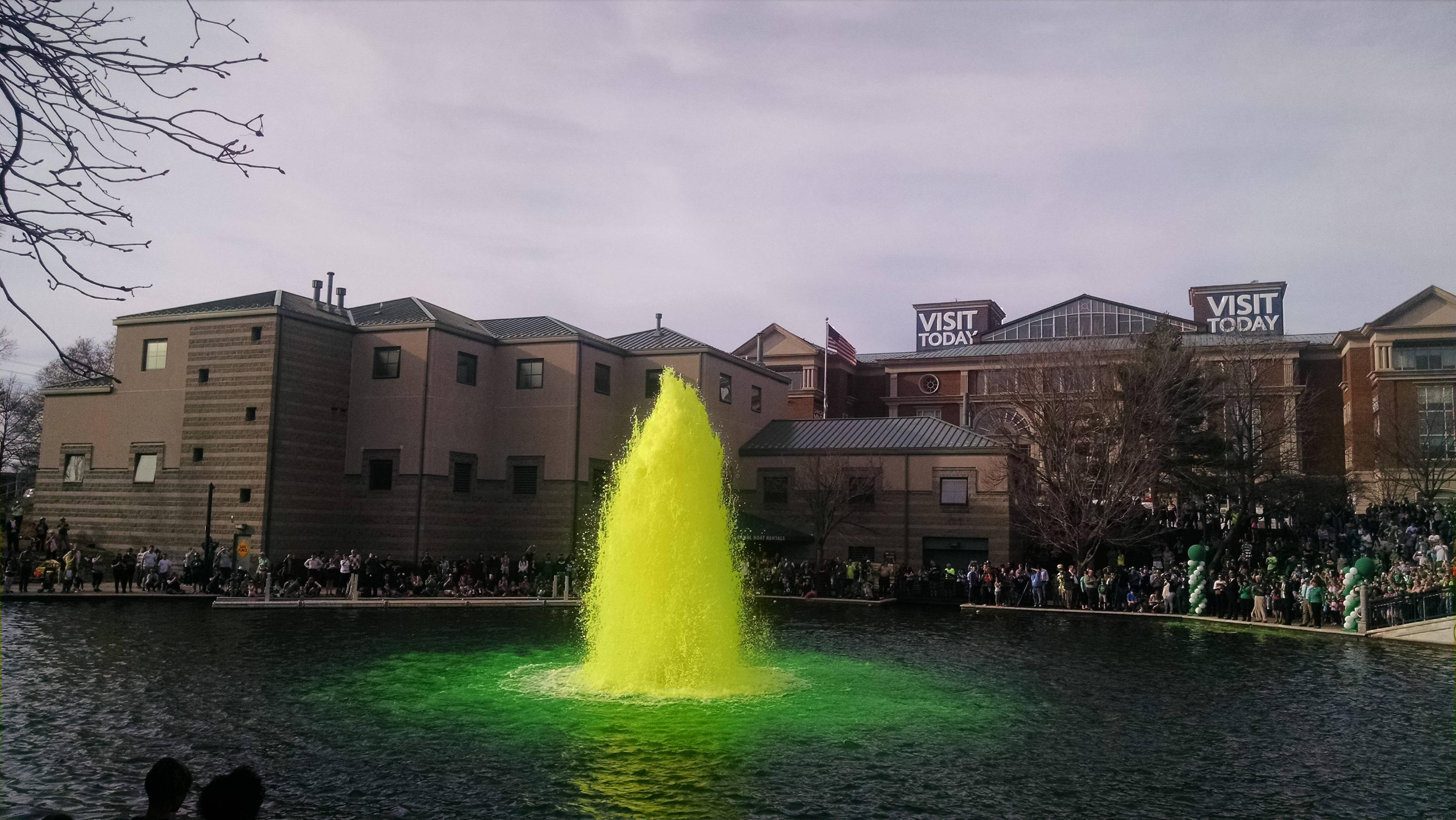
The Central Canal dyed green in 2015 for St. Patrick's Day

An annual event called the Indy Irish Fest occurs every September. On St. Patrick's Day, not only is there a parade, but the Indiana Central Canal is dyed green to celebrate the holiday.

There are also the Irish Dancers of Indianapolis, that celebrate the dancing of Ireland.

== See also ==
- History of the Irish in Louisville
