= Slippery Noodle Inn =

Historic building and live music venue in Indianapolis, Indiana, US

- U.S. Historic district – Contributing property
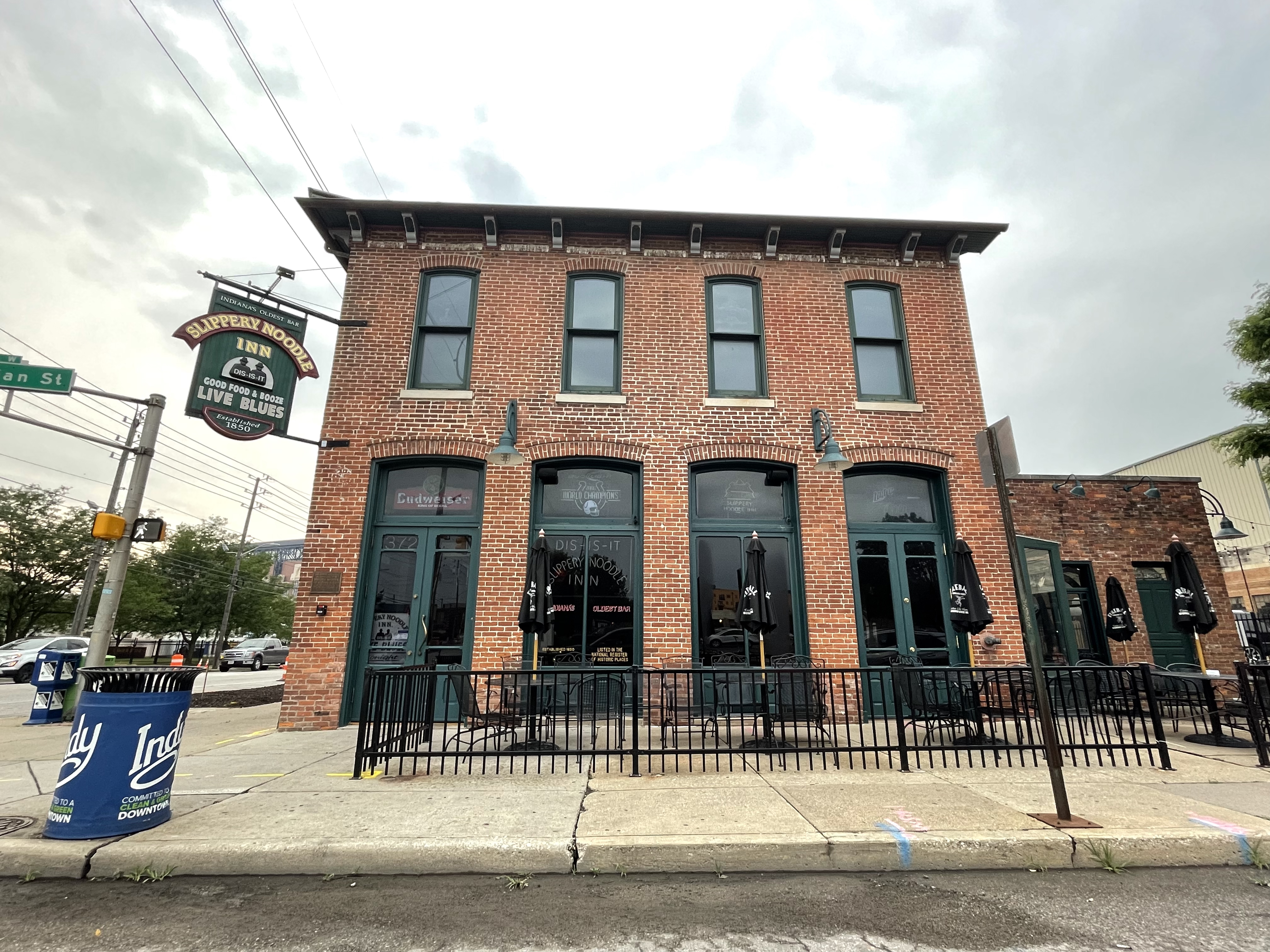
- Slippery Noodle Inn in 2022

- Location within Indiana Location within the United States
- Location: 372 South Meridian Street, Indianapolis, Indiana, U.S.
- Coordinates: 39°45′42″N 86°9′31″W
- Part of: Indianapolis Union Station—Wholesale Historic District (ID82000067)
- Added to NRHP: July 14, 1982

The Slippery Noodle Inn is a large blues bar and restaurant with two performance stages in downtown Indianapolis, Indiana, United States. It also has the distinction of being the oldest continuously operating bar in the state of Indiana, having opened in 1850 as the Tremont House.

The Inn served as a stop on the Underground Railroad during the American Civil War. During prohibition it was called a restaurant, although beer was still being made in the basement, and later it housed a brothel until 1953.

The Inn is the oldest commercial building in the city. Its tin ceiling dates to 1890 and the oak bar is also over a century old. The Inn has operated under its current name since 1963. It has hosted many legendary blues performers during that time, and is now one of the most prominent blues venues in the region.

== See also ==
- List of attractions and events in Indianapolis
