= Indianapolis Jewish Film Festival =

- Location: Indianapolis, United States
- Founded: 2014
- Website: Indianapolis Jewish Film Festival

The Indianapolis Jewish Film Festival is a film festival founded by Robert Epstein.

The inaugural festival was held from May 3 to May 10, 2014. The second festival was held from April 23 to May 3, 2015.

== See also ==
- Indianapolis International Film Festival
