= Epilogue Players =

Theater company in Indianapolis, Indiana, US

Epilogue Players is a theater company based in Indianapolis, Indiana. It was the first theater troupe for senior citizens founded in the United States and served as a model for the birth of the "senior theater" movement in the 1980s. In 1981, comedian George Burns attended the theater's annual banquet and gave the theater "five cigars," and crediting his "junior colleagues" for their talent. In 1990, Indiana Governor Frank O'Bannon named visiting the theater among his favorite leisure activities.

The company was founded by Bertha Starkus in 1976 with the backing of the Indiana Arts Commission, as an acting company focused on plays featuring older actors. Its first production took place at the Children's Museum of Indianapolis. Later, the group moved to the Command Playhouse at Ft. Harrison and then the Hedback Community Theatre.
