= Masjid Al Mu'mineen =

Indianapolis, Indiana mosque

Coordinates: 39°49′49.2″N 86°07′15.1″W

- مَسْجِد المُؤمنِين

Religion
- Affiliation: Islam
- Branch/tradition: Sunni
- Ecclesiastical or organizational status: Indiana Religious Corporation
- Ownership: Board of Trustees
- Leadership: Shura Council (Board of Directors)
- Year consecrated: 2001

Location
- Location: Indianapolis
- State: Indiana
- Country: United States of America
- Interactive map of Masjid Al Mu'mineen

Architecture
- Minaret height: N/A

Website
- www.masjidmumineen.com

Masjid Al Mu'mineen (Arabic: المَسْجِد المُؤمنِين, lit. The Mosque of the Believers) is a Sunni orthodox mosque located on the near east side of Indianapolis, Indiana. Established in 2001, it is the third Islamic place of worship in Indianapolis.

== History ==
By 1990 there were an estimated 2,000 Muslims living in the city of Indianapolis. The mosque was founded in 2000.
